= Vladivostok =

Largest city and administrative center of Primorsky Krai, Russia

Vladivostok Владивосток
- City
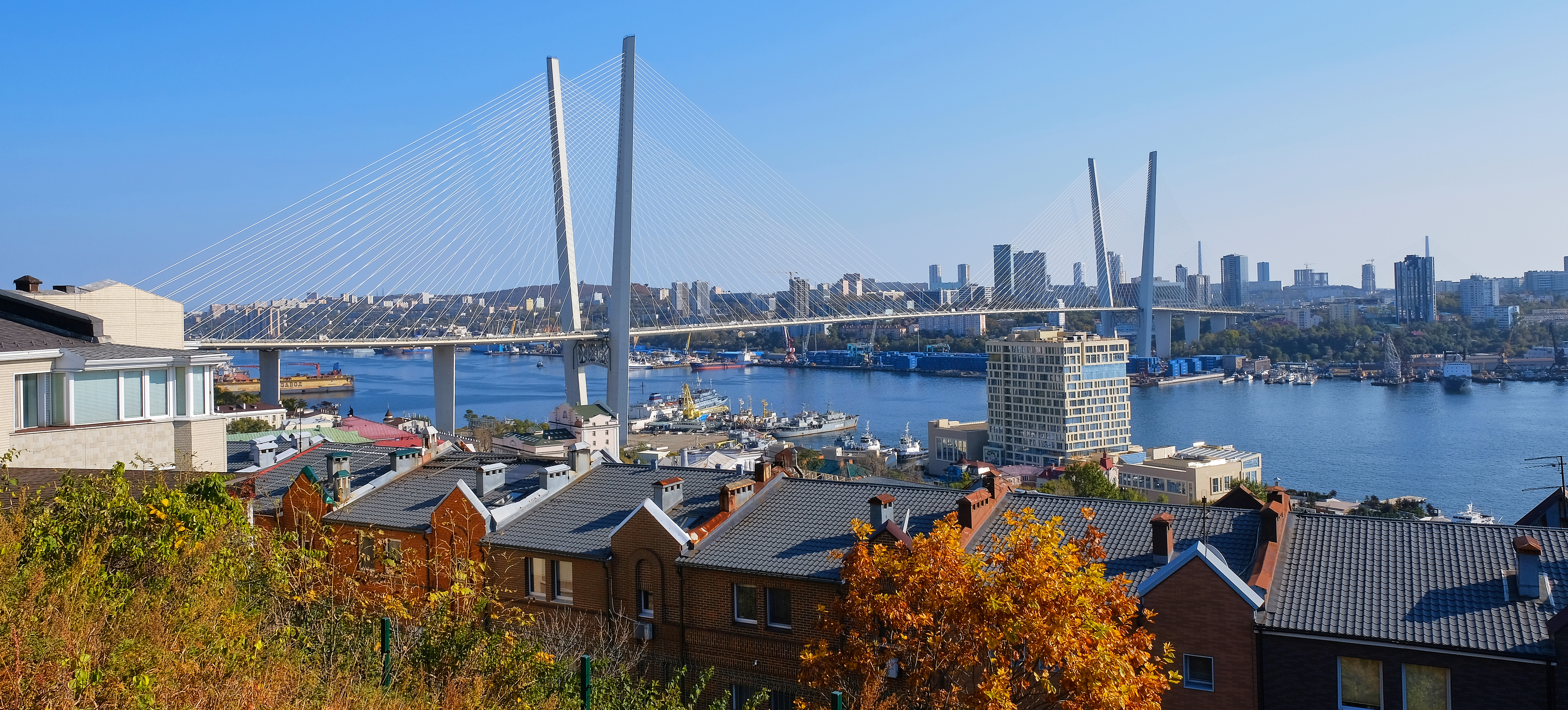
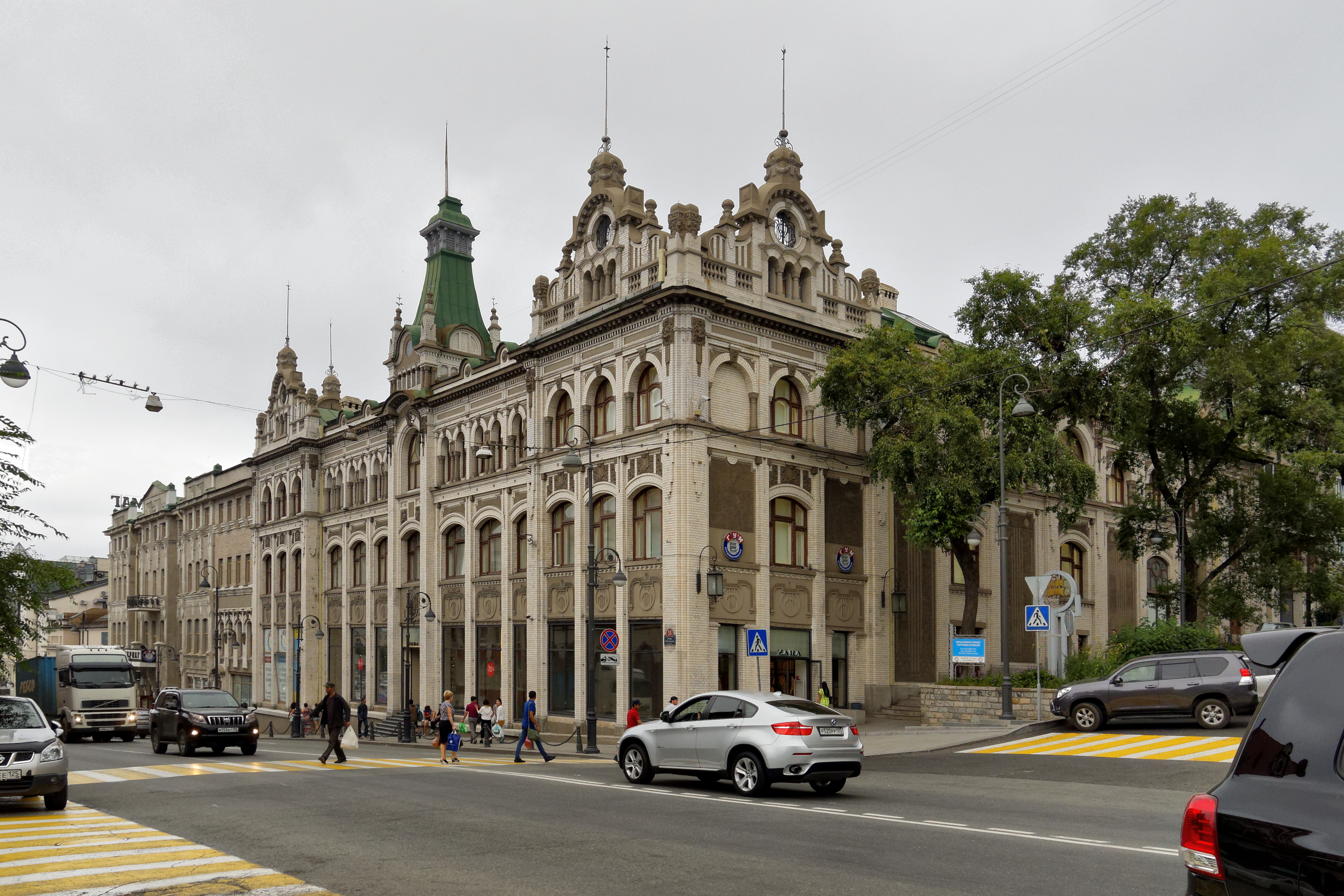
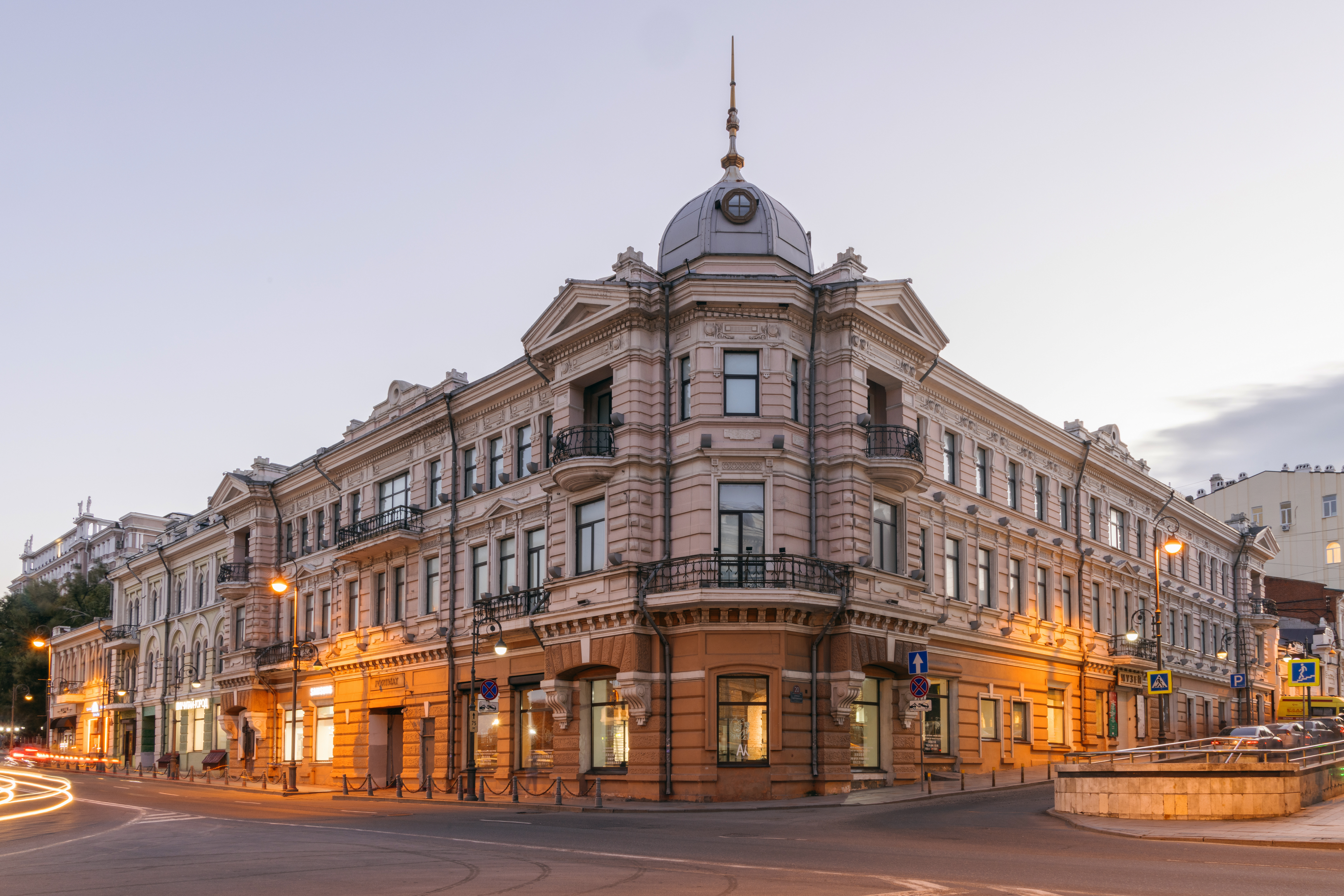
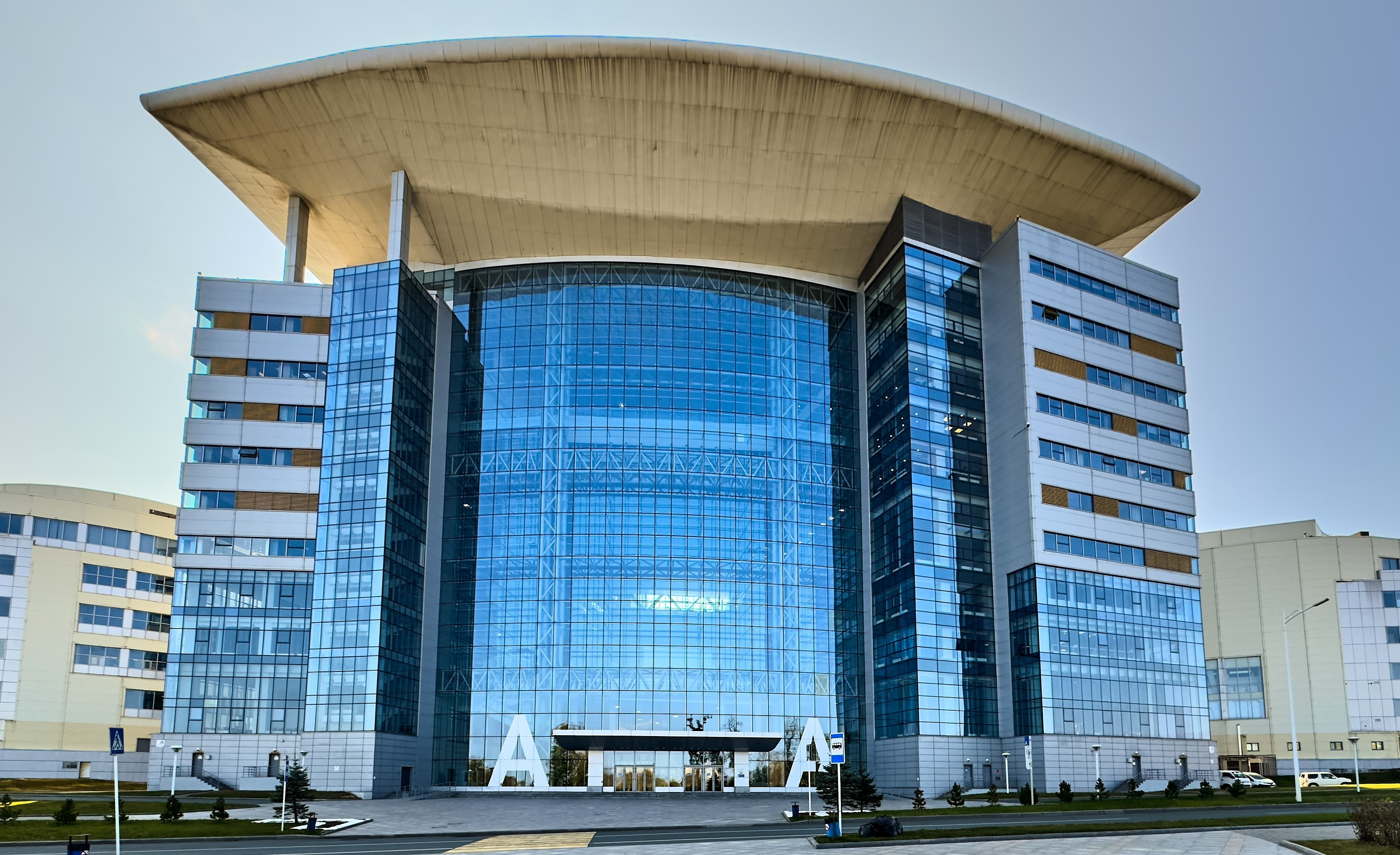
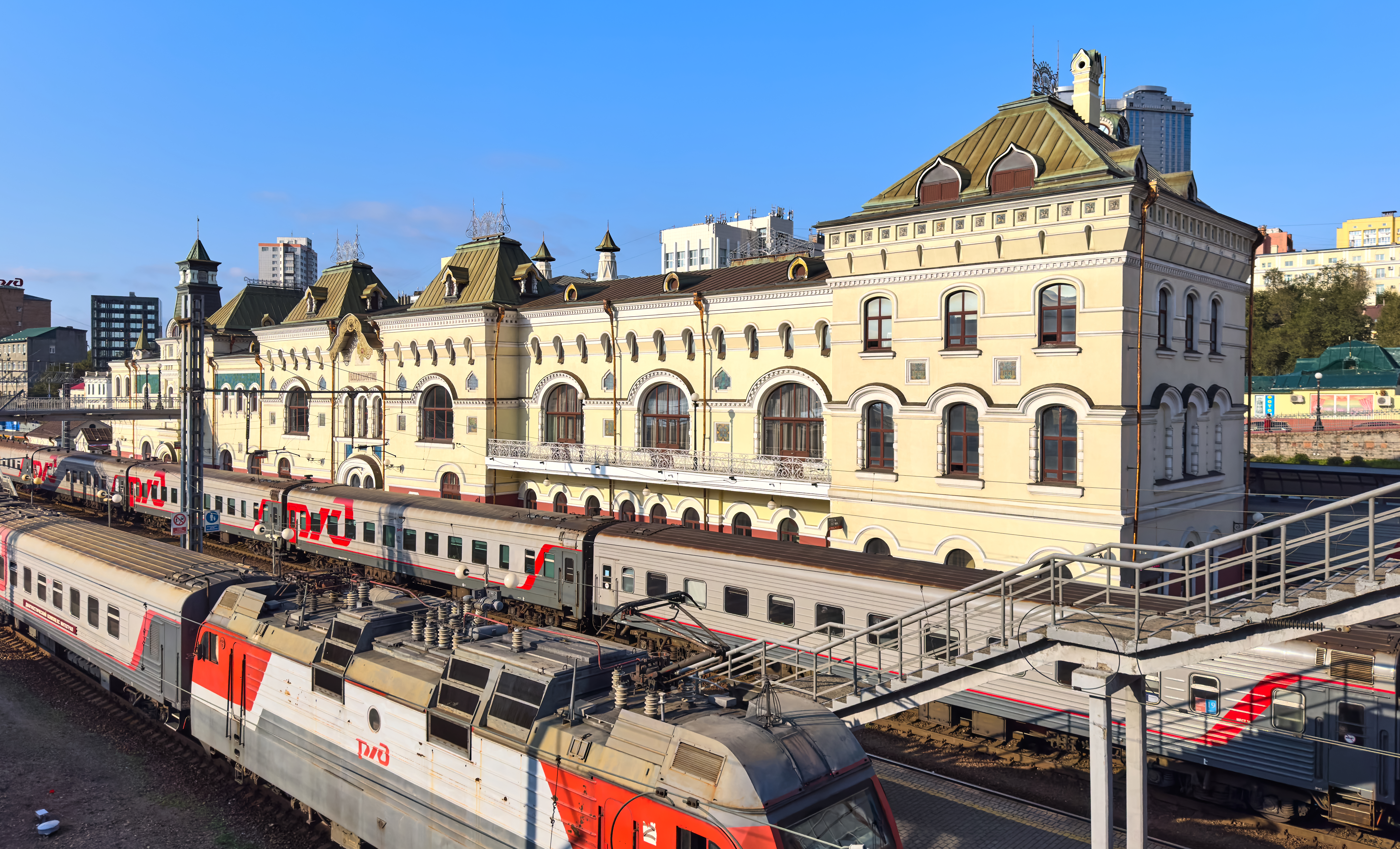
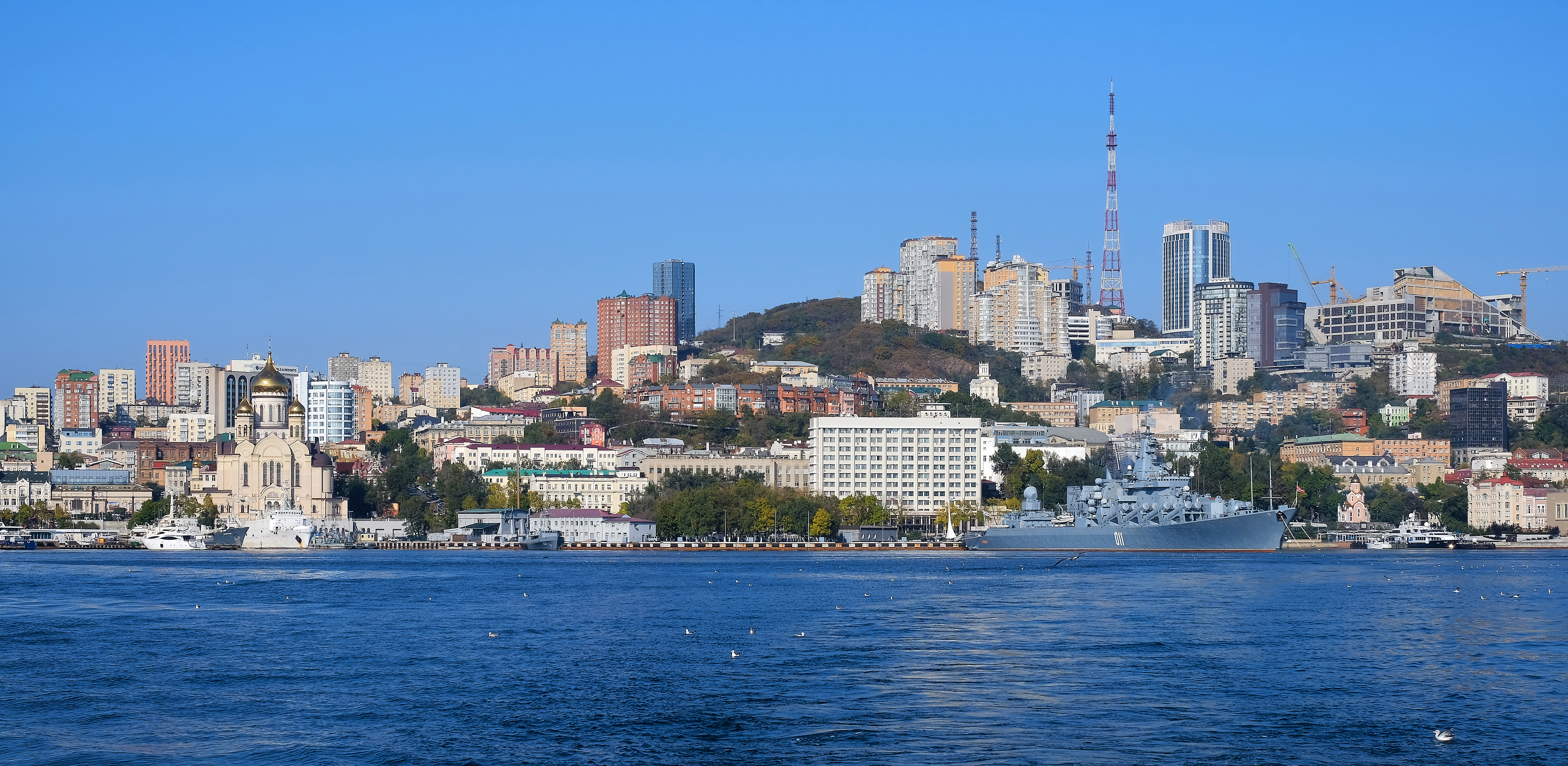
- Zolotoy Bridge and the Golden Horn Bay, with the Russky Bridge in the distance GUM Department Store Arseniev Museum of Far East History Far Eastern Federal University Vladivostok Railway Station View of Vladivostok from the Pacific Ocean

- Flag Coat of arms
- Anthem: Vladivostok - City of Military Glory
- Interactive map of Vladivostok
- Location of Vladivostok Vladivostok (Russia) Vladivostok (Asia)
- Coordinates: 43°06′54″N 131°53′07″E
- Country: Russia
- Federal subject: Primorsky Krai
- Founded: July 2, 1860
- City status since: April 22, 1880

Government
  - Body: City Duma
  - Head: Konstantin Shestakov

Area
  - Total: 331.16 km^{2} (127.86 sq mi)
- Elevation: 12 m (39 ft)

Population (2010 Census)
  - Total: 592,034
  - Estimate (2021): 603,519 (+1.9%)
  - Rank: 22nd in 2010
  - Density: 1,787.8/km^{2} (4,630.3/sq mi)

Administrative status
  - Subordinated to: Vladivostok City Under Krai Jurisdiction
  - Capital of: Primorsky Krai, Vladivostok City Under Krai Jurisdiction

Municipal status
  - Urban okrug: Vladivostoksky Urban Okrug
  - Capital of: Vladivostoksky Urban Okrug
- Time zone: UTC+10 (MSK+7)
- Postal code: 690xxx
- Dialing code: +7 423
- OKTMO ID: 05701000001
- City Day: July 2nd
- Website: www.vlc.ru

Vladivostok (Note: /ˌvlædɪˈvɒstɒk/ vlad-ih-VOS-tok; Russian: Владивосток, lit. 'Ruler of the East', IPA: [vlədʲɪvɐˈstok]) is the largest city and the administrative center of Primorsky Krai and the capital of the Far Eastern Federal District of Russia. It is located around the Golden Horn Bay on the Sea of Japan, covering an area of 331.16 square kilometers (127.86 square miles), with a population of 603,519 residents as of 2021. Vladivostok is the second-largest city in the Far Eastern Federal District, as well as the Russian Far East, after Khabarovsk. It is located approximately 45 kilometers (28 mi) from the China–Russia border and 134 kilometers (83 mi) from the North Korea–Russia border.

Vladivostok was historically part of Outer Manchuria. Shortly after the signing of the Treaty of Aigun between Qing China and the Russian Empire and affirmed by the Convention of Peking – from which it is also known as the Amur Annexation – the city was founded as a Russian military outpost on July 2, 1860. In 1872, the main Russian naval base on the Pacific Ocean was transferred to the city, stimulating its growth. By 1914 the city had experienced rapid growth economically with a population exceeding over 100,000 ethnically diverse inhabitants of which slightly less than half of the population were Russians. During this time, large Asian communities developed in the city. The public life of the city flourished; many public associations were created, from charities to hobby groups. After the outbreak of the Russian Revolution in 1917, Vladivostok was occupied in 1918 by White Russian and Allied forces, the last of whom, from the Japanese Empire, were not withdrawn until 1922 as its wider intervention in Siberia wound down alongside the collapse of the antirevolutionary White Army forces. The Red Army occupied the city that same year, absorbing the Far Eastern Republic into the Russian Soviet Federative Socialist Republic.

Following the dissolution of the Soviet Union in 1991, the city became a part of the Russian Federation. Vladivostok remains the largest Russian port on the Pacific Ocean, and the chief cultural, economic, scientific, and tourism hub of the Russian Far East. As the terminus of the Trans-Siberian Railway, the city was visited by over three million tourists in 2017. The city is the administrative center of the Far Eastern Federal District, and is the home to the headquarters of the Pacific Fleet of the Russian Navy. Due to its geographical position in Asia combined with its Russian architecture, the city has been referred to as "Europe in the Far East". Many foreign consulates and businesses have offices in Vladivostok, and the city hosts the annual Eastern Economic Forum. With a yearly mean temperature of around 5 °C (41 °F), Vladivostok has a cold climate for its mid-latitude coastal setting. This is due to winds from the vast Eurasian landmass in winter and the cooling ocean temperatures.

== Names and etymology ==
Vladivostok means 'Lord of the East' or 'Ruler of the East'. The name derives from Slavic владь (vlad, 'to rule' (Note: see Vladimir (name) for etymology)) and Russian восток (vostok, 'east'); Colloquial Russian speech may use the short form Vladik (Russian: Владик) or "vdk" (Russian: вдк) to refer to the city.

The city, along with other features in the Peter the Great Gulf area, was first given its modern name in 1859 by Nikolay Muravyov-Amursky. The name initially applied to the bay, but following an expedition by Alexey Karlovich Shefner in 1860, it was later applied to the new settlement. The form of the name appears analogous to that of the city of Vladikavkaz ("Ruler of the Caucasus" or "Rule the Caucasus"), now in North Ossetia–Alania, which was founded and named by the Russian Empire in 1784.

Chinese maps from the Yuan dynasty (1271–1368) referred to Vladivostok as Yongmingcheng (永明城; Yǒngmíngchéng). Since the Qing dynasty, the city has also been known as Haishenwai (海參崴; Hǎishēnwǎi, Hǎishēnwēi; 'sea cucumber bay') in Mandarin Chinese, named for its historical abundance of sea cucumbers. The Manchu name Haišenwei (Manchu: ᡥᠠᡳᡧᡝᠨᠸᡝᡳ) comes from Mandarin, although occasionally some modern Chinese sources falsely claim that it is the original name meaning "seaside fishing village". In China, Vladivostok is now officially known by the transliteration (Chinese: 符拉迪沃斯托克; pinyin: Fúlādíwòsītuōkè), although the historical Chinese name 海參崴 (Hǎishēnwǎi) is still used in common parlance and outside Mainland China to refer to the city. According to the provisions of the Chinese government, all maps published in China must bracket the city's Chinese name.

The modern-day Japanese name of the city is transliterated as Urajiosutoku (ウラジオストク). Historically, (Note: When the city was transliterated with Kanji, 鹽 was the Kyūjitai form in use. However, after postwar Kanji simplification, the Kanjis 鹽 and 德 were simplified in Japanese to 塩 and 徳, respectively.) the city's name was transliterated with Kanji as 浦鹽斯德 and shortened to Urajio (ウラジオ, 浦鹽).

== Geography ==
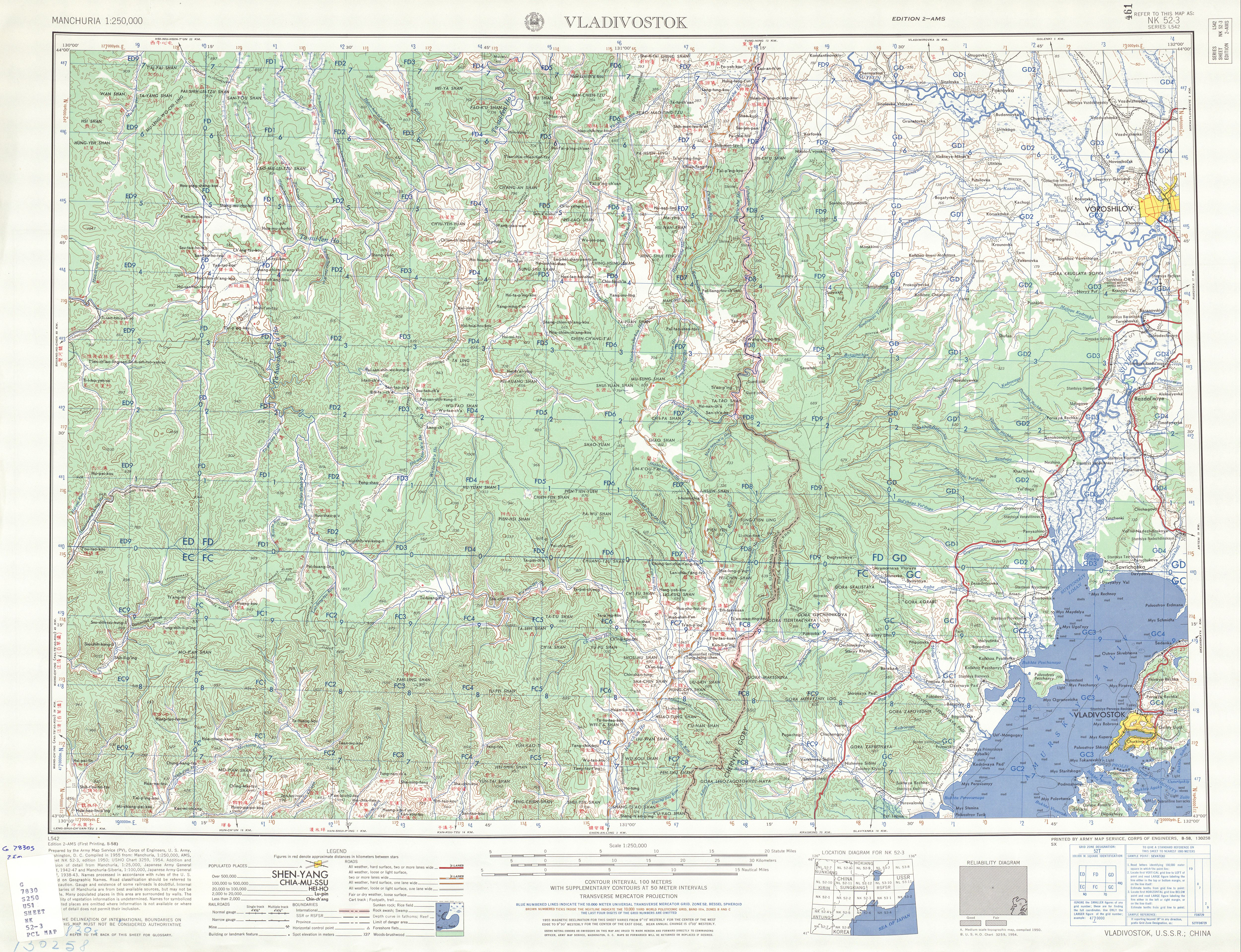
Vladivostok (1955)

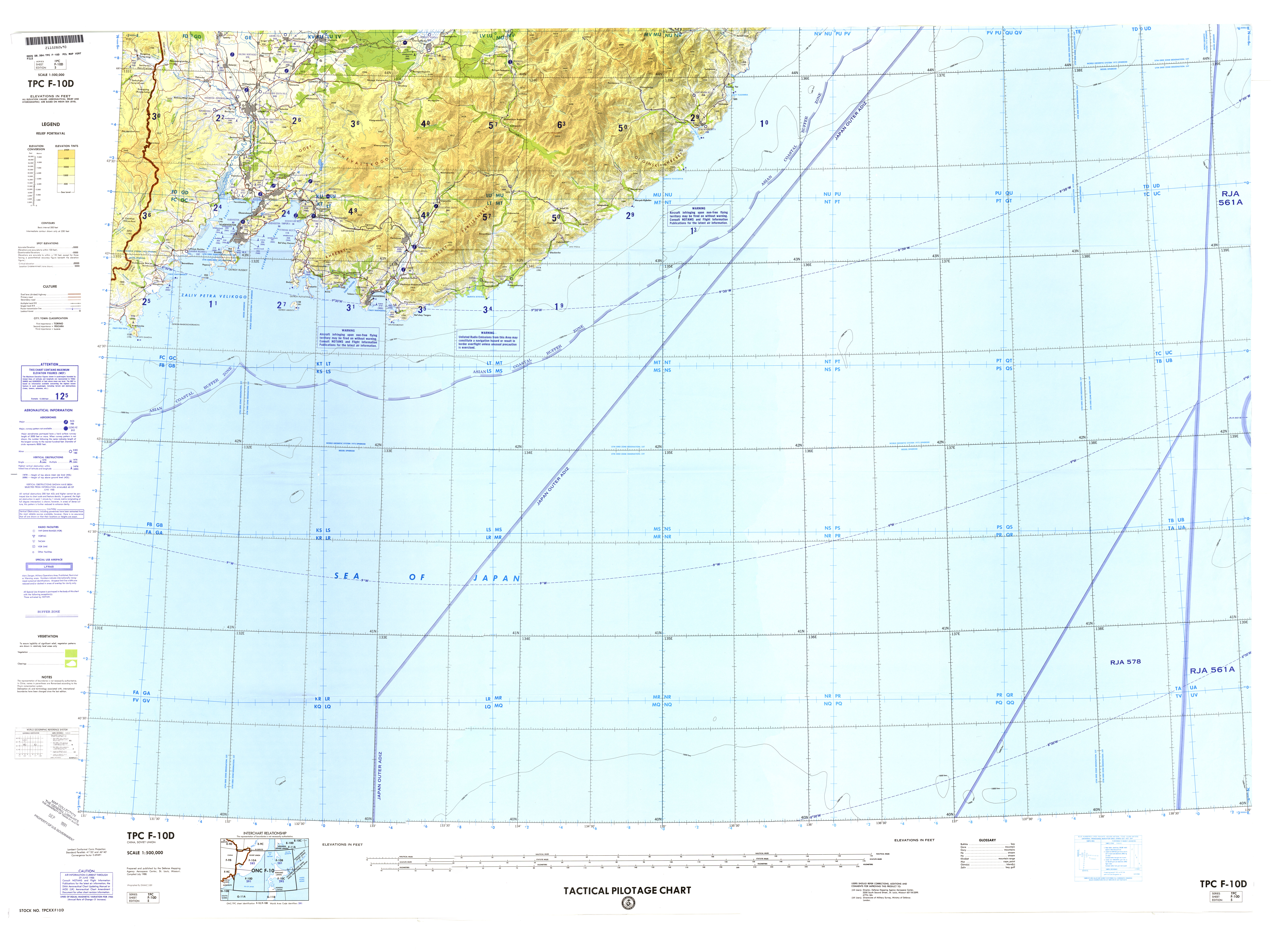
Vladivostok and surrounding region (DMA, 1988)

The city is located in the southern extremity of Muravyov-Amursky Peninsula, which is about 30 kilometers (19 mi) long and 12 kilometers (7.5 mi) wide.

The highest point in the city is Mount Kholodilnik, at 257 meters (843 ft). Eagle's Nest Hill is often called the highest point in the city, but with a height of 199 m (653 ft), or 214 m (702 ft) according to other sources, it is only the highest point in the city center, not the whole city.

Located in the extreme southeast of the Russian Far East, in the extreme southeast of North Asia, Vladivostok is geographically closer to Anchorage, Alaska, US and even Darwin, Australia than it is to the nation's capital of Moscow. Vladivostok is also closer to Honolulu, Hawaii, US than to the city of Sochi in Southern Russia. It also is further east than any area south of it in China and the entire Korean peninsula.

=== Climate ===
Vladivostok has a monsoon-influenced humid continental climate (Köppen climate classification Dwb, Trewartha climate classification Dcbc) with warm, humid and rainy summers and frigid, dry winters. Owing to the influence of the Siberian High, winters are much colder than a latitude of 43 degrees should warrant, given its low elevation and coastal location, with a January average of −11.9 °C (10.6 °F). Winter temperatures are somewhat colder than Milwaukee and far colder than Florence; all three locations are at or above 43 degrees north latitude. They are even colder than those of Moscow and Minneapolis, interior locations at 55 and 44 degrees north, respectively. Since the maritime influence is strong in summer, Vladivostok has a relatively cold annual climate for its latitude. For example, Vladivostok is 9.5 degrees Celsius colder than Sochi in terms of average temperature, and 17.5 degrees Celsius colder in terms of January temperatures, despite both being at 43 degrees North.

In winter, temperatures can drop below −20 °C (−4 °F) while mild spells of weather can raise daytime temperatures above freezing. The average monthly precipitation, mainly in the form of snow, is around 18.5 millimeters (0.73 in) from December to March. Snow is common during winter, but individual snowfalls are light, with a maximum snow depth of only 5 centimeters (2.0 in) in January. During winter, clear sunny days are common.

Summers are warm, humid and rainy, due to the East Asian monsoon. The warmest month is August, with an average temperature of +20 °C (68 °F). Vladivostok receives most of its precipitation during the summer months, and most summer days see some rainfall. Cloudy days are fairly common and because of the frequent rainfall, humidity is high, on average about 90% from June to August.

During the summer season, the city is prone to typhoons and tropical storms. Typhoon Sanba struck the city as a tropical storm in 2012. In Artyom, near Vladivostok, more than 300 ha (740 acres) of crops were inundated. Preliminary losses over the region were estimated to be ₽40 million (US$1.29 million). Typhoons can be rare, but tropical storms happen from the Sea of Japan after a typhoon landfall from South Korea and Japan.

On average, Vladivostok receives 840 millimeters (33 in) of precipitation per year, but the driest year was 1943, when 418 millimeters (16.5 in) of precipitation fell, and the wettest was 1974, with 1,272 millimeters (50.1 in) of precipitation. The winter months from December to March are dry, and in some years they have seen no measurable precipitation at all. Extremes range from −31.4 °C (−24.5 °F) in January 1931 to +33.6 °C (92.5 °F) in July 1939.

Climate data for Vladivostok (1991–2020 normals, extremes 1872–present)
Month	Jan	Feb	Mar	Apr	May	Jun	Jul	Aug	Sep	Oct	Nov	Dec	Year
Record high °C (°F)	5.0 (41.0)	9.9 (49.8)	19.4 (66.9)	27.7 (81.9)	29.5 (85.1)	31.8 (89.2)	33.6 (92.5)	32.6 (90.7)	30.0 (86.0)	23.7 (74.7)	17.5 (63.5)	9.4 (48.9)	33.6 (92.5)
Mean daily maximum °C (°F)	−7.8 (18.0)	−3.8 (25.2)	2.7 (36.9)	10.1 (50.2)	14.9 (58.8)	17.9 (64.2)	21.6 (70.9)	23.3 (73.9)	20.1 (68.2)	13.2 (55.8)	3.3 (37.9)	−5.4 (22.3)	9.2 (48.6)
Daily mean °C (°F)	−11.9 (10.6)	−8.1 (17.4)	−1.5 (29.3)	5.3 (41.5)	10.0 (50.0)	13.8 (56.8)	18.1 (64.6)	20.0 (68.0)	16.3 (61.3)	9.2 (48.6)	−0.7 (30.7)	−9.2 (15.4)	5.1 (41.2)
Mean daily minimum °C (°F)	−15.0 (5.0)	−11.3 (11.7)	−4.5 (23.9)	2.1 (35.8)	7.0 (44.6)	11.3 (52.3)	16.1 (61.0)	17.9 (64.2)	13.5 (56.3)	6.2 (43.2)	−3.5 (25.7)	−12.0 (10.4)	2.3 (36.1)
Record low °C (°F)	−31.4 (−24.5)	−28.9 (−20.0)	−21.3 (−6.3)	−7.8 (18.0)	−0.8 (30.6)	3.7 (38.7)	8.7 (47.7)	10.1 (50.2)	1.3 (34.3)	−9.7 (14.5)	−20.0 (−4.0)	−28.1 (−18.6)	−31.4 (−24.5)
Average precipitation mm (inches)	12 (0.5)	16 (0.6)	27 (1.1)	43 (1.7)	97 (3.8)	105 (4.1)	159 (6.3)	176 (6.9)	103 (4.1)	67 (2.6)	36 (1.4)	19 (0.7)	860 (33.9)
Average extreme snow depth cm (inches)	5 (2.0)	4 (1.6)	3 (1.2)	0 (0)	0 (0)	0 (0)	0 (0)	0 (0)	0 (0)	0 (0)	1 (0.4)	3 (1.2)	5 (2.0)
Average rainy days	0.3	0.3	4	13	20	22	22	19	14	12	5	1	133
Average snowy days	7	8	11	4	0.3	0	0	0	0	1	7	9	47
Average relative humidity (%)	58	57	60	67	76	87	92	87	77	65	60	60	71
Mean monthly sunshine hours	178.2	180.8	209.6	182.3	170.3	131.1	120.3	150.2	198.0	194.6	160.0	150.3	2,025.7
Source 1: Погода и Климат
Source 2: NOAA

Sea temperature data for Vladivostok
Month	Jan	Feb	Mar	Apr	May	Jun	Jul	Aug	Sep	Oct	Nov	Dec	Year
Average sea temperature °C (°F)	−1.2 (29.8)	−1.6 (29.1)	−0.9 (30.4)	2.6 (36.7)	8.8 (47.8)	14.2 (57.6)	19.4 (66.9)	22.4 (72.3)	19.4 (66.9)	13.7 (56.7)	6.2 (43.2)	0.7 (33.3)	8.64 (47.6)

== History ==
=== Foundation ===
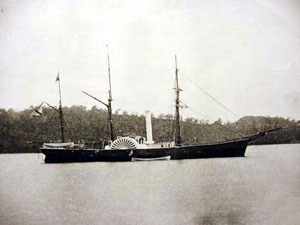
Steamship-corvette America on the Golden Horn Bay

Some modern Chinese historians claim that the city was the site of a Chinese settlement around 600 AD, where it was known as Yongmingcheng (永明城 [Yǒngmíngchéng], "city of eternal light") during the Yuan dynasty.

For a long time, the Russian government looked for a stronghold in the Far East; this role was played in turn by the settlements of Okhotsk, Ayan, Petropavlovsk-Kamchatsky, and Nikolaevsk-on-Amur. By the middle of the 19th-century, the search for the outpost had reached a dead end. None of the ports met the necessary requirement: to have a convenient and protected harbor next to important trade routes. After China was threatened with war on a second front by Governor-General of the Far East Nikolay Muraviev when China was suppressing the Taiping Rebellion, the Aigun Treaty was concluded by Muraviev's forces, after which Russian exploration of the Amur region began, and later, as a result of the signing of the Treaty of Tientsin and the Convention of Peking, the territory of modern Vladivostok was annexed to Russia. The name Vladivostok appeared in the middle of 1859, was used in newspaper articles and denoted a bay. On June 20 (or July 2 of the Gregorian calendar), 1860 the transport of the Siberian Military Flotilla "Mandzhur" under the command of Lieutenant-Commander Alexei Karlovich Shefner delivered a military unit to the Golden Horn Bay to establish a military post, which has now officially received the name of Vladivostok.

=== Early history ===
On October 31, 1861, the first civilian settler, a merchant, Yakov Lazarevich Semyonov, arrived in Vladivostok with his family. On March 15, 1862, the first act of his purchase of land was registered, and in 1870 Semyonov was elected the first head of the post, and a local self-government emerged. By this time, a special commission decided to designate Vladivostok as the main port of the Russian Empire in the Far East. In 1871, the main naval base of the Siberian Military Flotilla, the headquarters of the military governor and other naval departments were transferred from Nikolaevsk-on-Amur to Vladivostok.

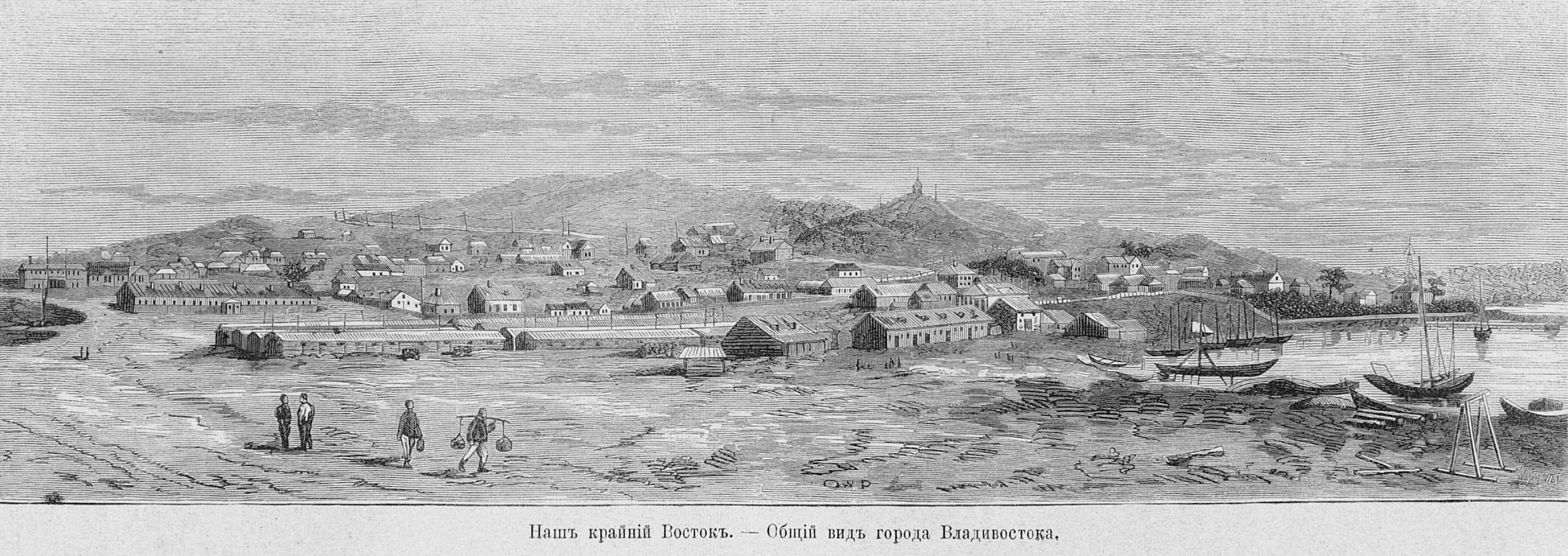
General view of Vladivostok, 1880

In the 1870s, the government encouraged resettlement to the South Ussuri region, which contributed to an increase in the population of the post: according to the first census of 1878, there were 4,163 inhabitants. The city status was adopted and the city Duma was established, the post of the city head, the coat of arms was adopted, although Vladivostok was not officially recognized as a city.

Due to the constant threat of attack from the Royal Navy, Vladivostok also actively developed as a naval base.

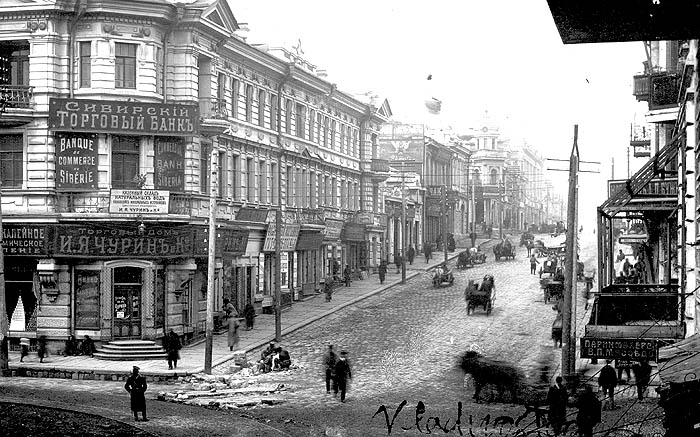
Intersection of Svetlanskaya and Aleutskaya streets in the 1910s. Building on the left is today Vladimir K. Arseniev Museum of Far East History

In 1880, the post officially received the status of a city. The 1890s saw a demographic and economic boom associated with the completion of the construction of the Ussuriyskaya branch of the Trans-Siberian Railway and the Chinese-Eastern Railway. According to the first census of the population of Russia on February 9, 1897, roughly 29,000 inhabitants lived in Vladivostok, and 10 years later the city's population had tripled. Korean haenyeo divers from Jeju Island and vicinities were active in Vladivostok.

The first decade of the 20th-century was characterized by a protracted crisis caused by the political situation: the government's attention was shifted to Lüshunkou and the Port of Dalian (Talien). As well as the Boxer uprising in North China in 1900–1901, the Russo-Japanese War of 1904–1905, and finally the first Russian revolution led to stagnation in the economic activity of Vladivostok.

Since 1907, a new stage in the development of the city began: the losses of Lüshunkou and Dalian (Talien) again made Vladivostok the main port of Russia on the Pacific Ocean. A free port regime was introduced, and until 1914 the city experienced rapid growth, becoming an important economic hub in the Asia-Pacific, as well as an ethnically diverse city with a population exceeding over 100,000 inhabitants: during the time ethnic Russians made up less than half of the population, and large Asian communities developed in the city. The public life of the city flourished; many public associations were created, from charities to hobby groups.

=== World War I and Russian Civil War ===
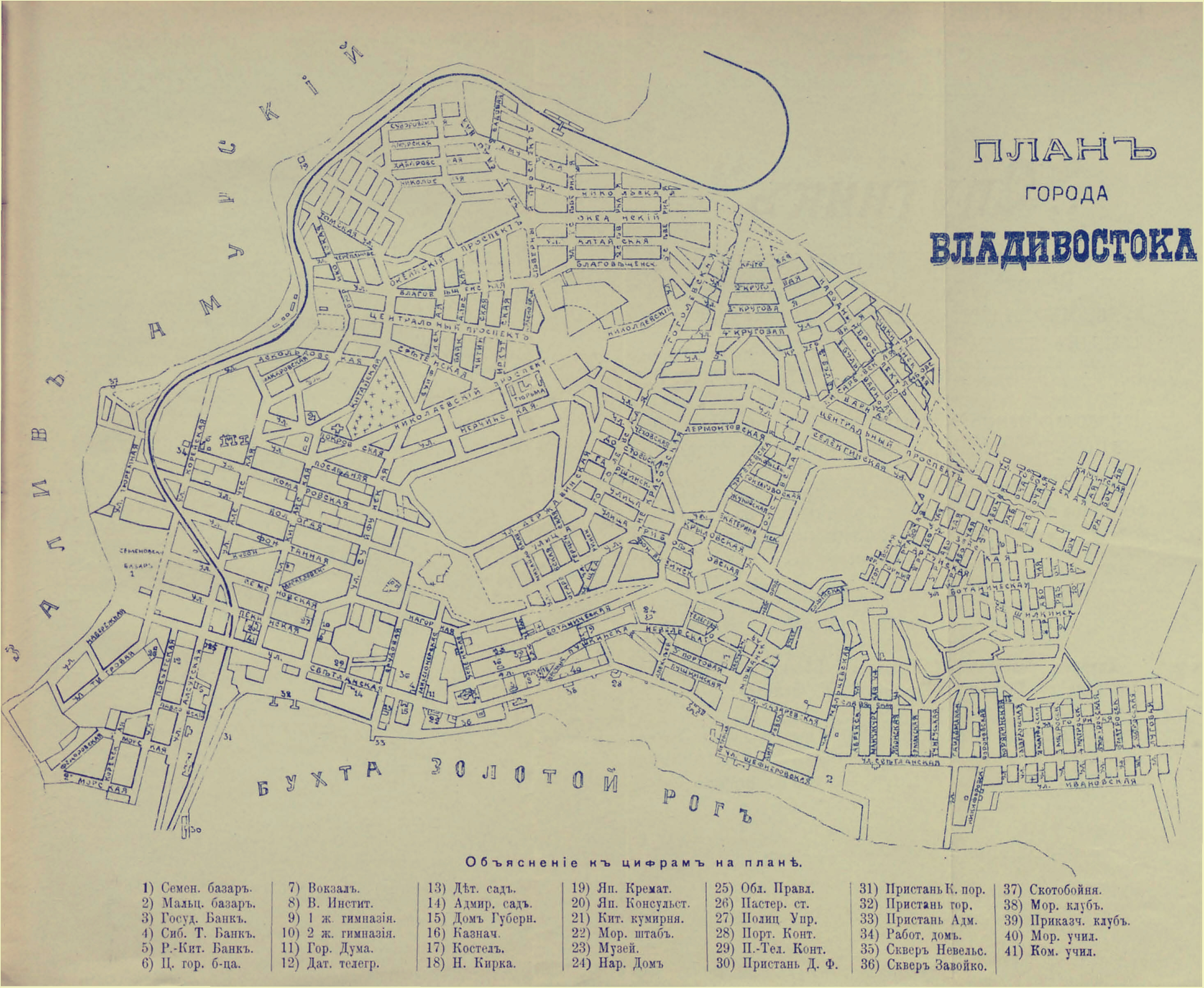
Map of Vladivostok, 1911

During World War I, no active hostilities took place in the city. However, Vladivostok was an important staging post for the import of military-technical equipment for troops from allied and neutral countries, as well as raw materials and equipment for industry.

Immediately after the October Revolution in 1917, during which the Bolsheviks came to power, the Decree on Peace was announced, and as a result of the Treaty of Brest-Litovsk concluded between the Bolshevik government of Russia and the Central Powers, led to the end of Soviet Russia's participation in World War I. On October 30, the sailors of the Siberian Military Flotilla decided to "rally around the united power of the Soviets", and the power of Vladivostok, as well as all of the Trans-Siberian Railway passed to the Bolsheviks. During the Russian Civil War, from May 1918, they lost control of the city to the White Army-allied Czechoslovak Legion, who declared the city to be an Allied protectorate. Vladivostok became the staging point for the Allies' Siberian intervention, a multi-national force including Japan, the United States and China; China sent forces to protect the local Chinese community after appeals from Chinese merchants. The intervention ended in the wake of the collapse of the White Army and regime in 1919; all Allied forces except the Japanese withdrew by the end of 1920.

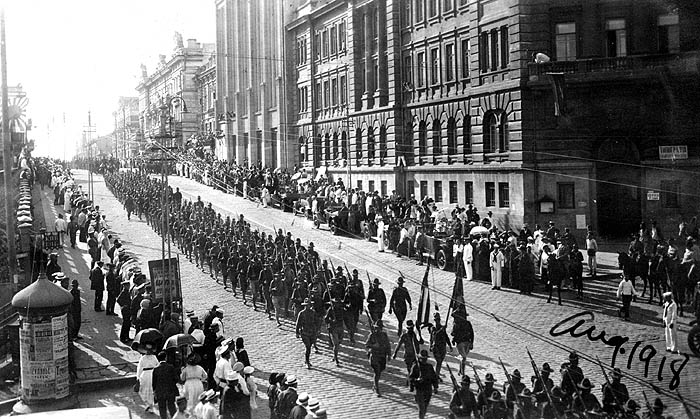
American troops marching on Vladivostok following the Allied intervention in the Russian Civil War, 1918

Throughout 1919 the region was engulfed in a partisan war. To avoid a war with Japan, with the filing of the Soviet leadership, the Far Eastern Republic, a Soviet-backed buffer state between Soviet Russia and Japan, was proclaimed on April 6, 1920. The Soviet government officially recognized the new republic in May, but in Primorye a riot occurred, where significant forces of the White Movement were located, leading to the creation of the Provisional Priamurye Government, with Vladivostok as its capital.

In October 1922, the troops of the Red Army of the Far Eastern Republic under the command of Ieronim Uborevich occupied Vladivostok, displacing the White Army formations from it. In November, the Far Eastern Republic liquidated and became a part of Soviet Russia.

=== Soviet period ===
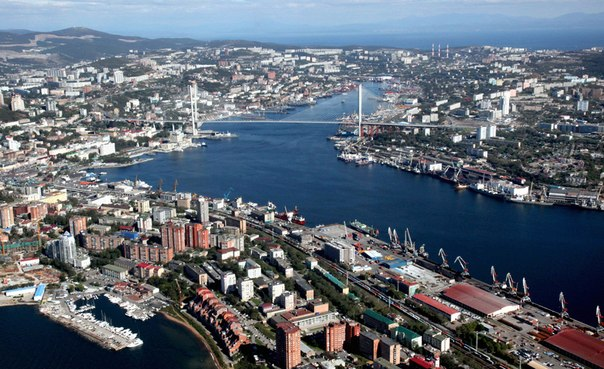
Aerial view of Vladivostok and the Golden Horn Bay in 2014

By the time of the establishment of Soviet power, Vladivostok was clearly in decline. The retreating forces of the Imperial Japanese Army (IJA) removed items of material value from the city. Life was paralyzed; there was no money in the banks, and the equipment of enterprise was plundered. Due to mass migration and repression, the city's population decreased to 106,000 inhabitants. Between 1923 and 1925, the government adopted a "three-year restoration" plan, during which operations at the commercial port were resumed, and it became the most profitable in the country (from 1924 to 1925). The "restoration" period was distinguished by a number of peculiarities: the Russian Far East did not adopt 'war communism', but was, immediately, inducted to the New Economic Policy.

In 1928, the government decided to accelerate the industrialization of the country. A number of subsequent "five-year plans" changed the face of Primorye, making it an industrial region, partly as a result of the creation of numerous concentration camps in the region. In the 1930s and 1940s, Vladivostok served as a transit point on the route used to deliver prisoners and cargo for the Sevvostlag of the Soviet super-trust Dalstroy. The notorious Vladivostok transit camp was located in the city. In addition, in the late 1930s and early 1940s, the Vladivostok forced labour camp (Vladlag) was located in the area of the Vtoraya Rechka railway station.

Vladivostok was not a place of hostilities during the Great Patriotic War, although there was a constant threat of attack from Japan. In the city, a "Defense Fund" was created (the first in the country), to which the residents of Vladivostok contributed personal wealth. During the war years Vladivostok handled imported cargo (lend-lease) of a volume almost four times more than Murmansk and almost five times more than Arkhangelsk.

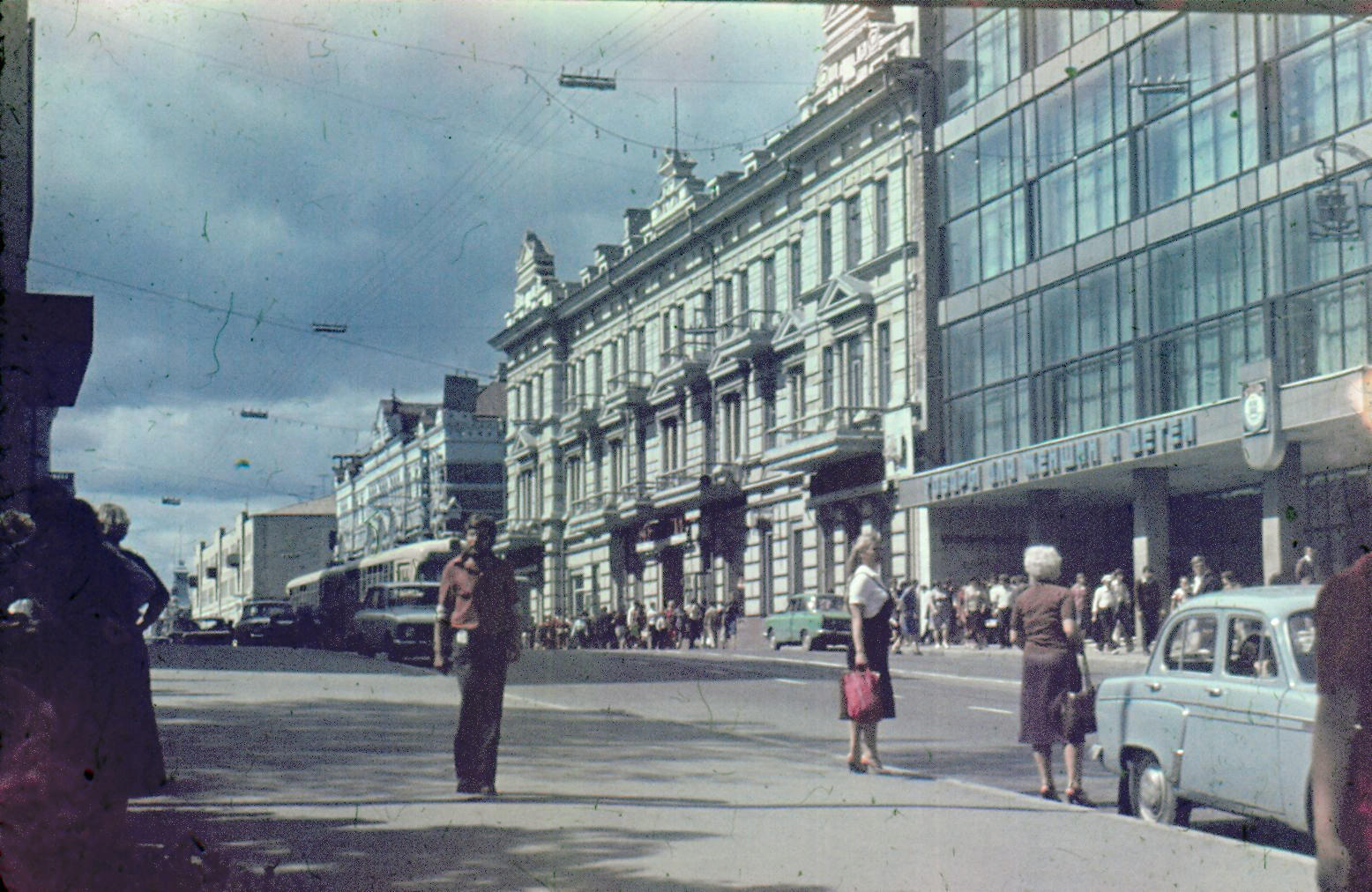
Downtown Vladivostok in 1982

By the decree of the Council of Ministers of the Soviet Union "Issues of the Fifth Navy" dated August 11, 1951, a special regime was introduced in Vladivostok (it began to operate on January 1, 1952); the city was closed to foreigners. It was planned to remove from Vladivostok not only foreign consulates, but also the merchant and fish fleet and transfer all regional authorities to Voroshilov (now Ussuriysk). However, these plans were not implemented.

During the years of the Khrushchev Thaw, Vladivostok received special attention from state authorities. In 1954, Nikita Khrushchev visited the city for the first time to finally decide whether to secure the status of a closed naval base for him. It was noted that at that time the urban infrastructure was in a deplorable state. In 1959, Khrushchev visited the city again. The result was a decision on the accelerated development of the city, which was formalized by the decree of the Council of Ministers of the Soviet Union on January 18, 1960. During the 1960s, a new tram line was built, a trolleybus was launched, the city became a huge construction site: residential neighborhoods were being erected on the outskirts, and new buildings for public and civil purposes were erected in the center.

In 1974, Gerald Ford paid an official visit to Vladivostok, to meet with Leonid Brezhnev, becoming the first President of the United States to visit the city.

On September 20, 1991, Boris Yeltsin signed decree No. 123 "On the opening of Vladivostok for visiting by foreign citizens", which entered into force on January 1, 1992, ending Vladivostok's status as a closed city.

=== Modern period ===
On 3 November 2010, the remains of the executed uncovered during construction of the Sedanka-Patrokl Highway were reburied in the northern part of the Lesnoe cemetery and an Orthodox cross was raised over the mass grave.

In 2012, Vladivostok hosted the 24th APEC summit. Leaders from the APEC member countries met at Russky Island, off the coast of Vladivostok. With the summit on Russky Island, the government and private businesses inaugurated resorts, dinner and entertainment facilities, in addition to the renovation and upgrading of Vladivostok International Airport. Two giant cable-stayed bridges were built in preparation for the summit, the Zolotoy Rog bridge over the Zolotoy Rog Bay in the center of the city, and the Russky Island Bridge from the mainland to Russky Island (the longest cable-stayed bridge in the world). The new campus of Far Eastern Federal University was completed on Russky Island in 2012.

In December 2018, the seat of the Far Eastern Federal District, established in May 2000, was moved from Khabarovsk to Vladivostok.

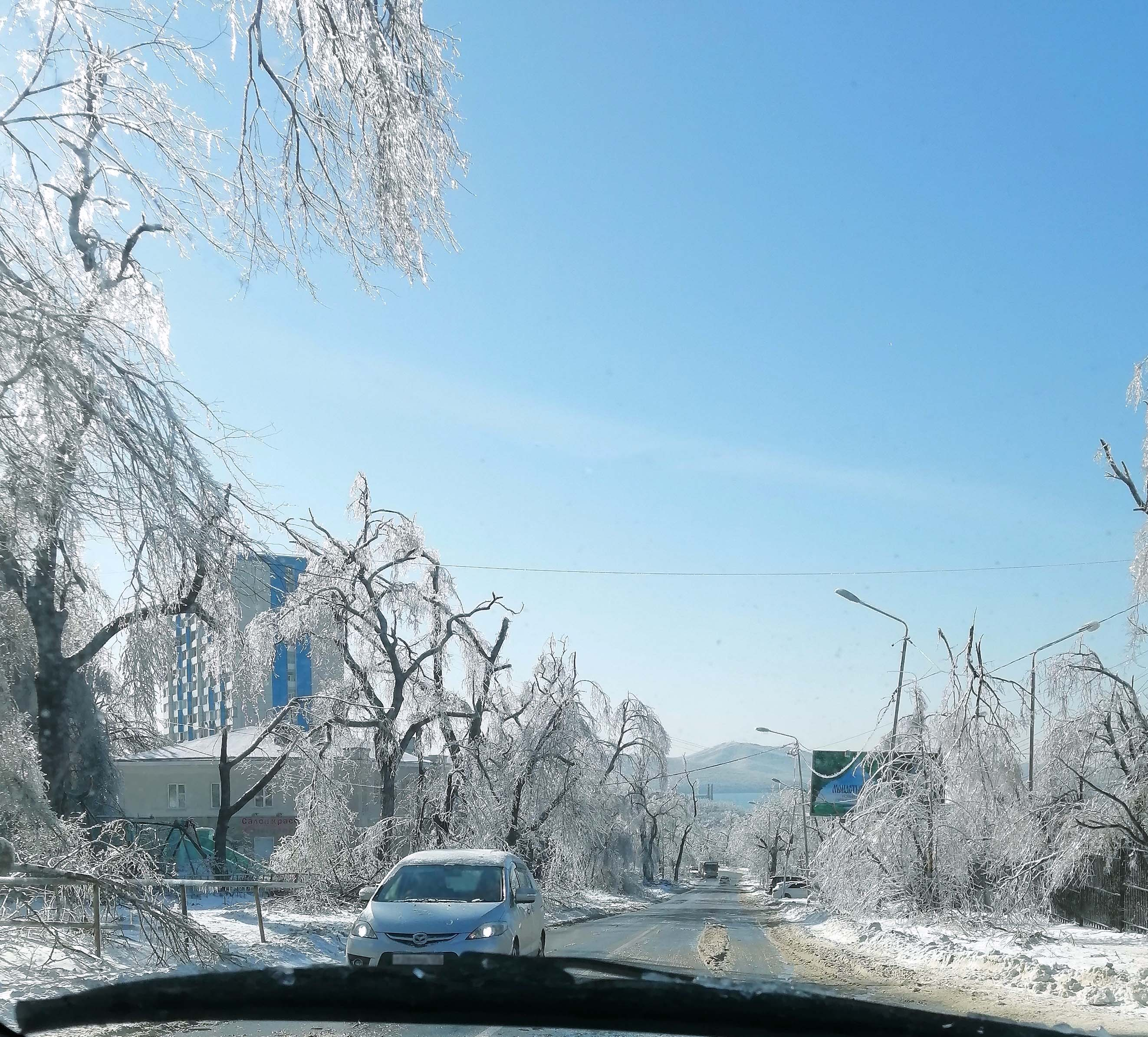
Freezing rain aftermath. Photo of November, 21.

In November 2020, the city and region had experienced a rare weather phenomenon in the face of freezing rain caused by collision of warm and cold air masses. The result was wires and trees encrusted in ice up to 1.2 cm (0.47 in) thick. More than 1,500 homes were left without electricity, 900 without heating, 870 without hot water, 500 without cold water. Between 60% and 70% of Vladivostok's forests were damaged.

== Politics ==
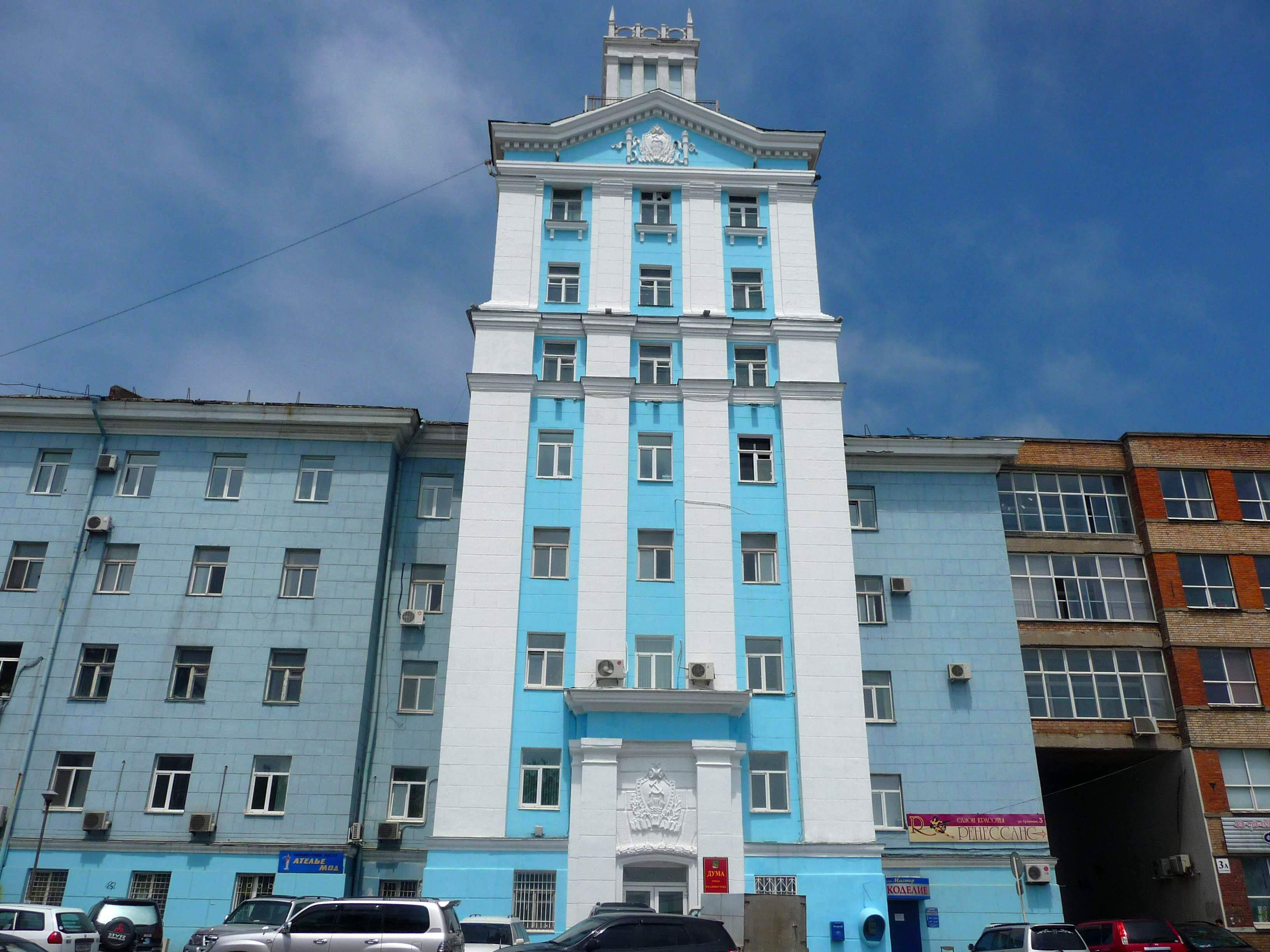
Vladivostok City department of the Russian Ministry of Emergency Situations

The structure of the city administration has the City Council at the top.

The responsibilities of the administration of Vladivostok are:

- Exercise of the powers to address local issues of Vladivostok in accordance with federal laws, normative legal acts of the Duma of Vladivostok, decrees and orders of the head of the city of Vladivostok;
- The development and organization of the concepts, plans and programs for the development of the city, approved by the Duma of Vladivostok;
- Development of the draft budget of the city;
- Ensuring implementation of the budget;
- The use of territory and infrastructure of the city;
- Possession, use and disposal of municipal property in the manner specified by decision of the Duma of Vladivostok

Legislative authority is vested in the City Council. The new City Council began operations in 2001 and in June that year, deputies of the Duma of the first convocation of Vladivostok began their work. On December 17, 2007, the Duma of the third convocation began. The deputies consist of 35 elected members, including 18 members chosen by a single constituency, and 17 deputies from single-seat constituencies.

== Administrative and municipal status ==
Vladivostok is the administrative center of the krai. Within the framework of administrative divisions, it is, together with five rural localities, incorporated as Vladivostok City Under Krai Jurisdiction; an administrative unit equal to that of the districts in status. As a municipal division, Vladivostok City Under Krai Jurisdiction is incorporated as Vladivostoksky Urban Okrug.

=== Administrative divisions ===
Administrative divisions of the city of Vladivostok

Vladivostok is divided into five administrative districts:

- Leninsky
- Pervomaisky
- Pervorechensky
- Sovietsky
- Frunzensky

=== Local government ===
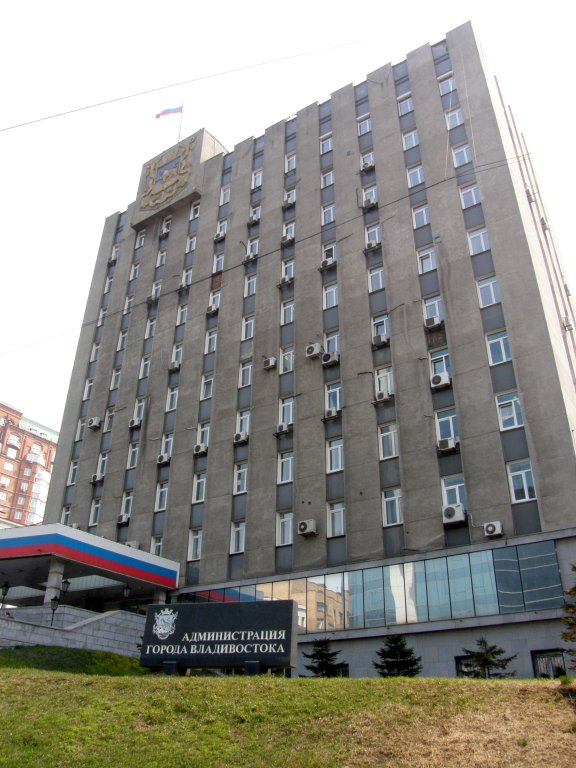
Vladivostok City Hall

The city charter approved the following structure of local government bodies:

- City Duma is a representative body
- The head of the city is its highest official
- Administration is the executive and administrative body
- Chamber of Control and Accounts – controls the body

Vladivostok City Duma's history dates from November 21, 1875, when 30 "vowels" were elected. Great changes took place after the 1917 Revolution, when the first general elections were held and women were allowed to vote. The last meeting of the Vladivostok City Duma took place on October 19, 1922, and on October 27 it was officially abolished. In Soviet times, its functions were performed by the City Council. In 1993, by a presidential decree, the Soviets were dissolved and, until 2001, all attempts to elect a new Duma were unsuccessful. The Duma of the city of Vladivostok of the fifth (current) convocation began work in the fall of 2017, consisting of 35 deputies.

The head of Vladivostok, on the principles of one-man management, manages the city's administration, which he forms in accordance with federal laws, laws of the Primorsky Territory and the city charter. The city's administrative structure is approved by the City Duma on the proposal of the head, and may include sectoral (functional) and territorial bodies of the administration of Vladivostok.

Igor Pushkaryov was the city's mayor from May 2008 to June 2016; previously he was a Federation Council member of Primorsky Krai. On June 27, 2016, Konstantin Loboda, the first deputy mayor, was appointed as the Vladivostok's new acting mayor. On December 21, 2017, Vitaly Vasilyevich Verkeenko was appointed the head of the city.

== Demographics ==
=== Population, dynamics, age and sex ===
Historical population
Year	Pop.	±%
1897	28,933	—
1926	107,980	+273.2%
1939	206,432	+91.2%
1959	290,608	+40.8%
1970	440,889	+51.7%
1979	549,789	+24.7%
1989	633,838	+15.3%
2002	594,701	−6.2%
2010	592,034	−0.4%
2021	603,519	+1.9%
Source: Census data

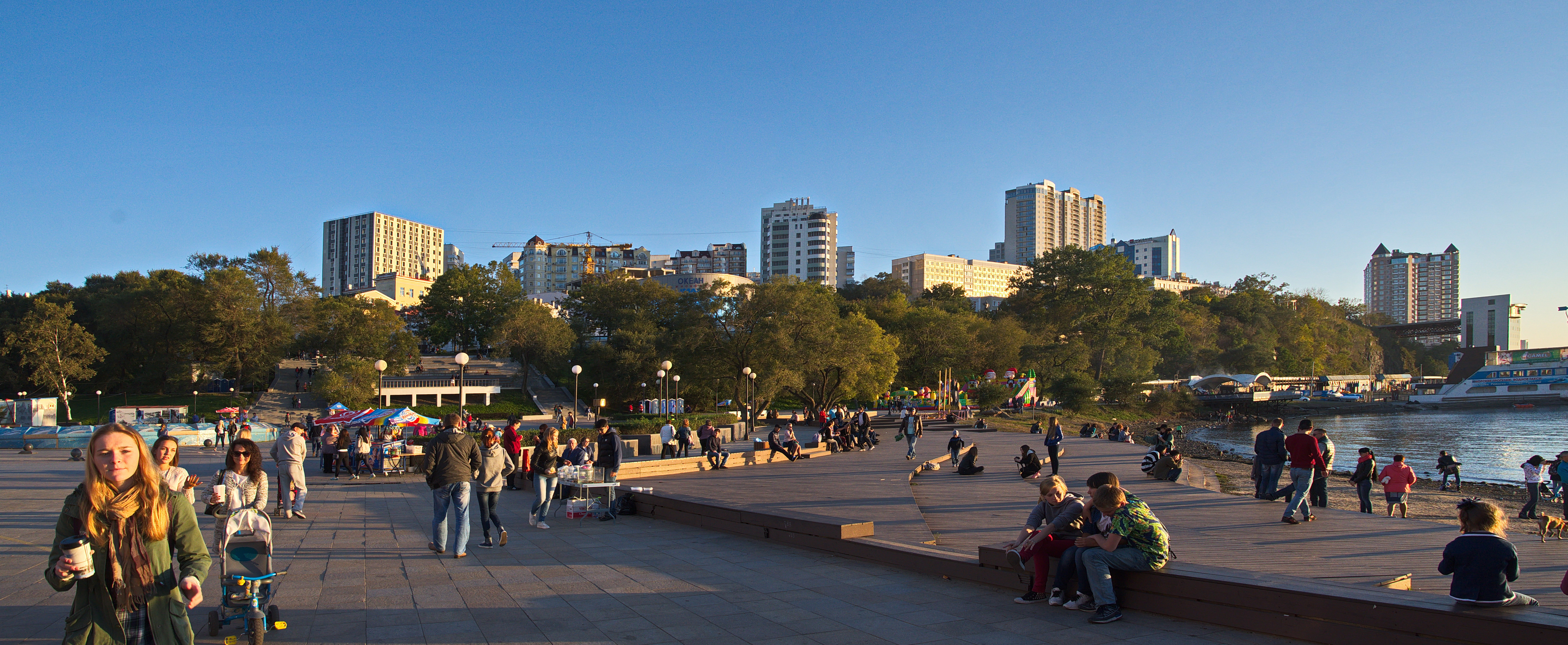
Russians walking by the Pacific Ocean in Vladivostok

According to the Russian Census of 2021, Vladivostok had a population of 603,519, with 634,835 residents in the greater urban area. Since the city's founding its population has actively grown, save for the periods of the Russian Civil War and the demographic crisis after dissolution of the Soviet Union in the 1990s and the beginning of the 2000s. In the 1970s, the population exceeded over 500,000, and in 1992 reached a historical high of over 648,000. The average population density is about 1,832 people/km^{2}.

The population has risen by 30,000. Since 2013, natural growth dynamics added 727 individuals to this figure by 2015's end. By 2020, Vladivostok's population reached over 600,000, as reported by the Russian Federal Statistics Bureau.

The city's age distribution includes a large segment of older adults. Overall, the population includes 12.7% who are younger than able-bodied; 66.3% who are able-bodied; and 21% who are older than able-bodied. Vladivostok's population, like that of Russia as a whole, includes a significantly greater number of women than men.

=== Ethnic composition ===
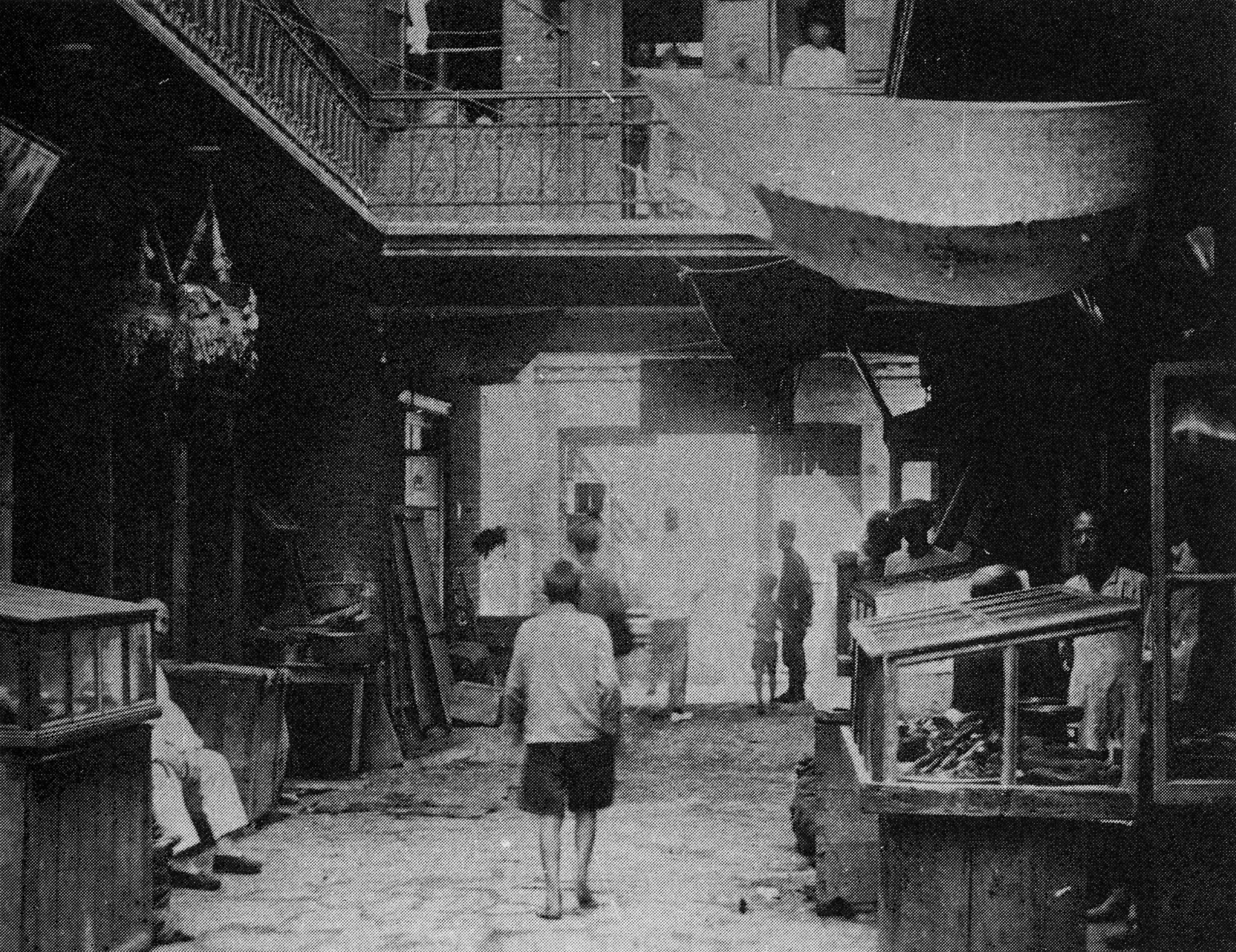
Millionka in the 1920s

The demographic makeup of the city went through significant changes since its foundation, and was marked by several waves of immigration from both Europe and Asia. From the late 1890s to the early 1920s, half of the city's population was Asian, with the Chinese being the largest Asian group, followed by Koreans and Japanese. The old Chinese quarter of the city was called Millionka and in its peak accommodated up to 50,000 Chinese residents. The neighbourhood had its own small shops, theatres, opium dens, brothels, and hideouts for smugglers and thieves. The city's economy was heavily dependent on the services provided by the Chinese merchants and businessmen in the neighbourhood. Specifically, the retail services of the city were controlled by the Chinese, as they had more retail shops than Russians did. There also existed an ethnic enclave of Koreans called Sinhanch'on. Koreans moved to the area in significant quantities following the annexation of Korea by Japan in 1910. By 1915, the Korean population in the city stood at around 10,000. Sinhanch'on became a hub of the Korean independence movement and hosted the first Korean provisional government, the Korean Independence Army Government. On the orders of Joseph Stalin, both Millionka and Sinhanch'on were liquidated, and their residents deported between 1936 and 1938. Today, the city is much more homogeneous, with more than 90 percent declaring Russian ethnicity. However, there still exists a minority of Koreans and Chinese in Vladivostok, accounting for roughly 1 percent of the population, as well as more recent immigrants from Central Asia, mainly from Uzbekistan. Historical German, French, Estonian, American, and Central Asian diasporas at the start of the 21st century have been little studied.

Ethnicity	Population (2010)	Percentage
Russians	475,170	92.4%
Ukrainians	10,474	2.0%
Uzbeks	7,109	1.4%
Koreans	4,192	0.8%
Chinese	2,446	0.5%
Others	14,850	2.9%

According to the Russian census of 2010, Vladivostok's residents include representatives of over seventy nationalities and ethnic groups. Among them, the largest ethnic groups (over 1,000 people) are: ethnic Russians (475,200); Ukrainians (10,474); Uzbeks (7,109); Koreans (4,192); Chinese (2,446); Tatars (2,446); Belarusians (1,642); Armenians (1,635); and Azerbaijanis (1,252).

== Cityscape ==
=== Urban layout ===
The historical core of the city evolved around the city's port. The city was first established as a military outpost. The main buildings of the post such as barracks, administrative buildings, church and other facilities were located at the northern and north-western border of the Golden Horn Bay. In 1868 its spatial development was regulated when the first urban plan created by Mikhail Lubensky, according to which the city was divided into rectangular blocks each containing 8 plots. In the 1870s, the central government's decision to relocate the Siberian Fleet from Nikolaevsk-on-Amur to Vladivostok sparked a construction boom. The city’s first architect, Yuliy Rego, oversaw the planning of building blocks along its first street, Amerikanskaya (later renamed Svetlanskaya), which runs along the embankment of Golden Horn Bay. As the city territory began to expand, occupying the northern and western shores to Amur Bay and deep into the peninsula. The central street of the city, Svetlanskaya, follows the outlines of the coastline, and the streets perpendicular to it rise up the slopes of the hills. By the end of the 19th century, the city's urban layout was organized around two main streets: Svetlanskaya, which ran parallel to the Golden Horn Bay and the port, and Aleutskaya, which ran perpendicular to it along the peninsula. The railway station, completed in 1894, was located at their intersection. This layout, combined with the city’s hilly topography, allowed for visual access to the water from most areas. In accordance with the 1906 master plan of the city, these two streets were the most integrated within the foundational grid layout.

The Soviet period which began following the city's occupation by the People's Revolutionary Army of the Far Eastern Republic in October 1922 set new priorities and direction. During the first Soviet five-year plan, the "Plan for the existing and planned layout of the city of Vladivostok" (1928) was adopted. The implementation of the construction program affected the appearance of the city: more multi-story buildings appeared, and the single-story wooden buildings of the era of the first settlers disappeared. Groups of large buildings appeared on the outskirts of the city, as a result of which the scale of the sea panorama began to increase.

In June 1931, the plenum of the Central Committee of the Communist Party of the Soviet Union adopted a program for the construction of new and the reconstruction of old cities in the Soviet Union. As part of the designated reconstruction in Vladivostok, a general plan for the city was drawn up in 1934, and the plan itself was developed in 1936 under the direction of architect Yevgeny Vasiliev. In the end, the project was never approved, but it was used in the development of individual areas of the city. In 1923-1933, housing construction was carried out in the city: houses were erected on Egersheld, 2-ya Flotskaya, Sukhanovskaya, and Beregovaya Streets. The Railway Workers' Club was built in the Pervaya Rechka area.

While the city was not damaged during World War II as it was far from the front, during the war and in the post-war period it suffered from a relative negligence due to the Soviet government's focus on reconstruction of cities in European Russia. The 1954 master plan envisioned the construction of a central square at the intersection of Leninskaya and Kitaiskaya streets. It was planned to place the Fighters for the Soviet Power of Alexei Tenta at the square. In 1961, the Soviet government approved a new 20-year urban master plan, developed by the Lengiprogor Institute in Leningrad. The plan called for the construction of new urban districts and improvements to the transportation infrastructure, including the addition of a bridge across Golden Horn Bay.

During the decades that followed World War II, as the city expanded, its development stretched into the direction of the slopes of the mountains adjacent to the city which are called in Russian Sopki. At later stages construction occurred even on the top of the slopes, a situation which contributing to high infrastructure and transportation costs.

== Economy ==
The city's main industries are shipping, commercial fishing, and the naval base. Fishing accounts for almost four-fifths of Vladivostok's commercial production. Other food production totals 11%.

A very important employer and a major source of revenue for the city's inhabitants is the import of Japanese cars. Besides salesmen, the industry employs repairmen, fitters, import clerks as well as shipping and railway companies. The Vladivostok dealers sell 250,000 cars a year, with 200,000 going to other parts of Russia. Every third worker in the Primorsky Krai has some relation to the automobile import business. In recent years, the Russian government has made attempts to improve the country's own car industry. This has included raising tariffs for imported cars, which has put the car import business in Vladivostok in difficulties. To compensate, Prime Minister Vladimir Putin ordered the car manufacturing company Sollers to move one of its factories from Moscow to Vladivostok. The move was completed in 2009, and the factory now employs about 700 locals. It is planned to produce 13,200 cars in Vladivostok in 2010.

=== Seaport ===
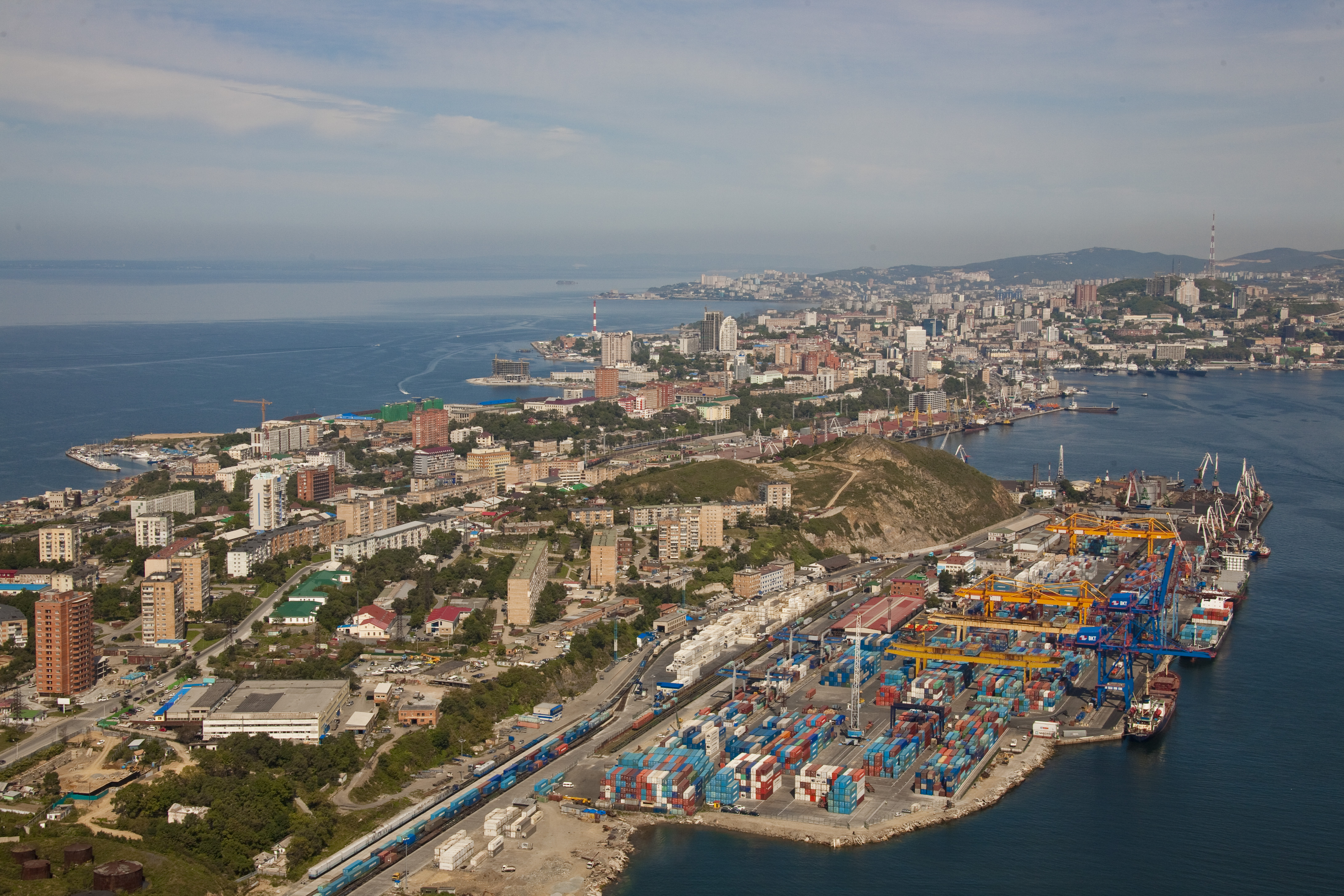
Port of Vladivostok

Vladivostok is a link between the Trans-Siberian Railway and the Pacific Sea routes, making it an important cargo and passenger port. It processes both cabotage and export-import general cargo of a wide range. 20 stevedoring companies operate in the port. The cargo turnover of the Vladivostok port, including the total turnover of all stevedoring companies, at the end of 2018 amounted to 21.2 million tons.

In 2015, the total volume of external trade seaport amounted to more than 11.8 billion dollars. Foreign economic activity was carried out with 104 countries.

=== Tourism ===
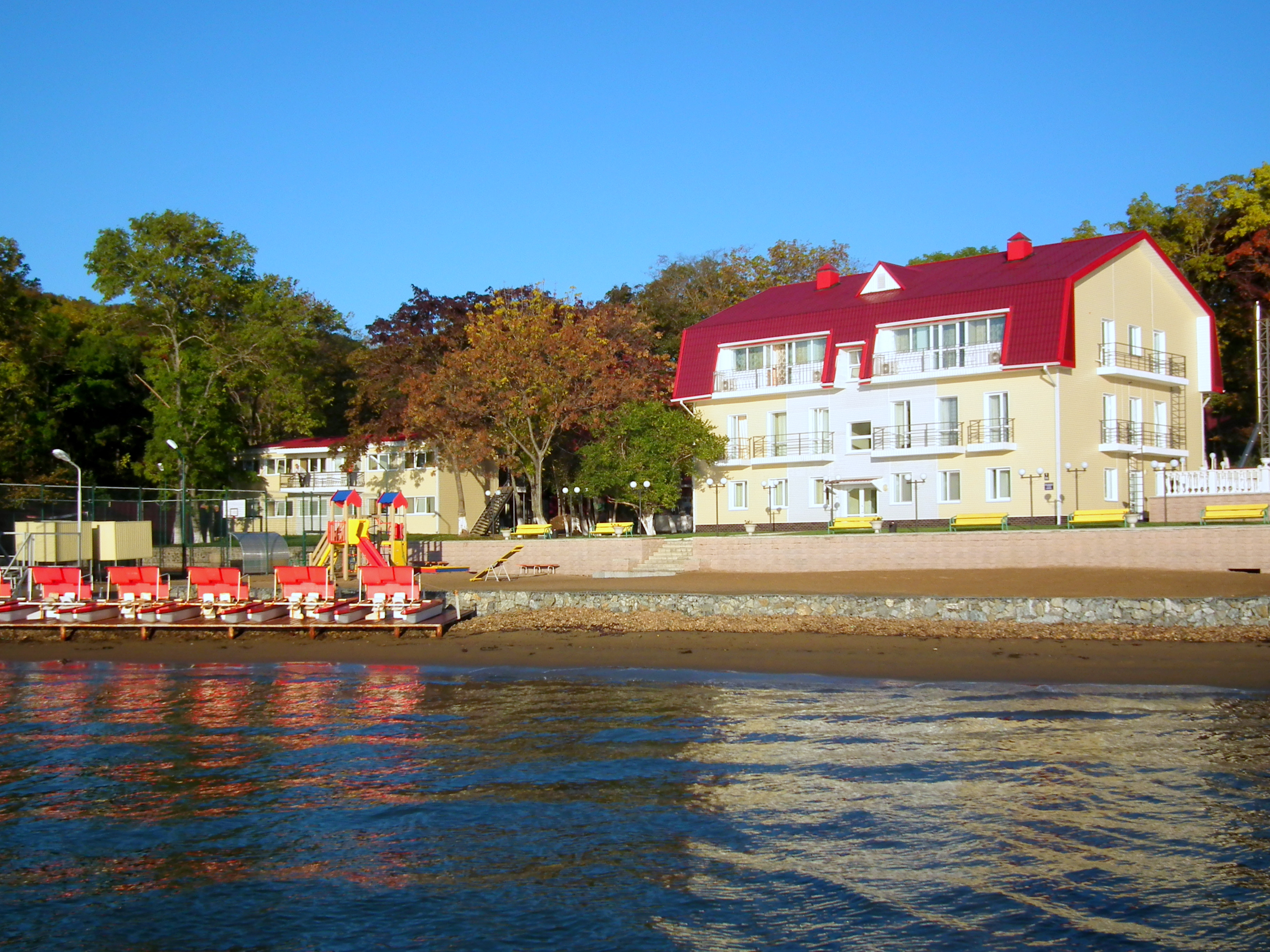
A sanatorium on the shores of the Ussuri Bay

Vladivostok is located in the extreme southeast of the Russian Far East, and is the closest city to the countries of the Asia-Pacific with an exotic European culture, which makes it attractive to tourists. The city is included in the project for the development of the Far East tourism "Eastern Ring". Within the framework of the project, the Primorsky Stage of the Mariinsky Theater was opened, and there are plans to open branches of the Hermitage Museum, the Russian Museum, the Tretyakov Gallery and the State Museum of Oriental Art. Vladivostok entered the top ten Russian cities for recreation and tourism according to Forbes, and also took the fourteenth place in the National Tourism Rating.

In addition to being a cultural hub, the city also is a tourism hub in the Peter the Great Gulf. The city's resort area is located on the coast of Amur Bay, which includes over 11 sanatoriums. Vladivostok also has a bustling gambling zone, which has over 11 casinos planned to open by 2023. Tigre de Cristal, the city's first casino, was visited by over 80,000 tourists, in less than a year of its opening.

In 2017, the city was visited by around 3,000,000 tourists, including 640,000 foreigners, of which over 90% are tourists from Asia, specifically China, South Korea and Japan. Domestic tourism is based on business tourism (business trips to exhibitions, conferences), which accounts for up to 70% of the inbound flow. In Vladivostok, diplomatic tourism is also developed, as there are 18 foreign consulates in the city. There are 46 hotels in the city, with a total fund of 2561 rooms. The vast majority of the travel companies of Primorsky Krai (86%) are concentrated in Vladivostok, and their number was around 233 companies in 2011.

== Transportation ==
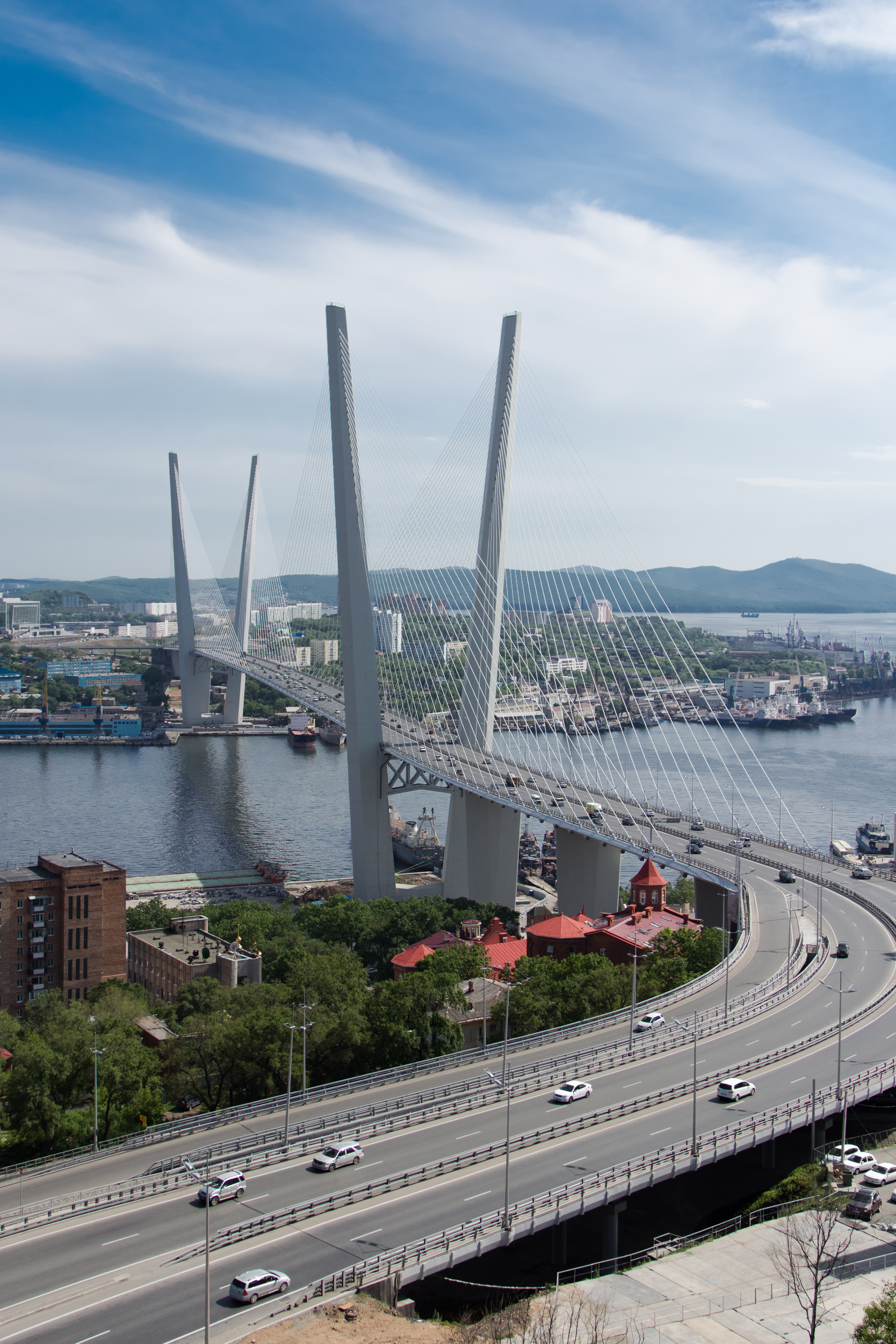
Zolotoy Bridge across bay in the city

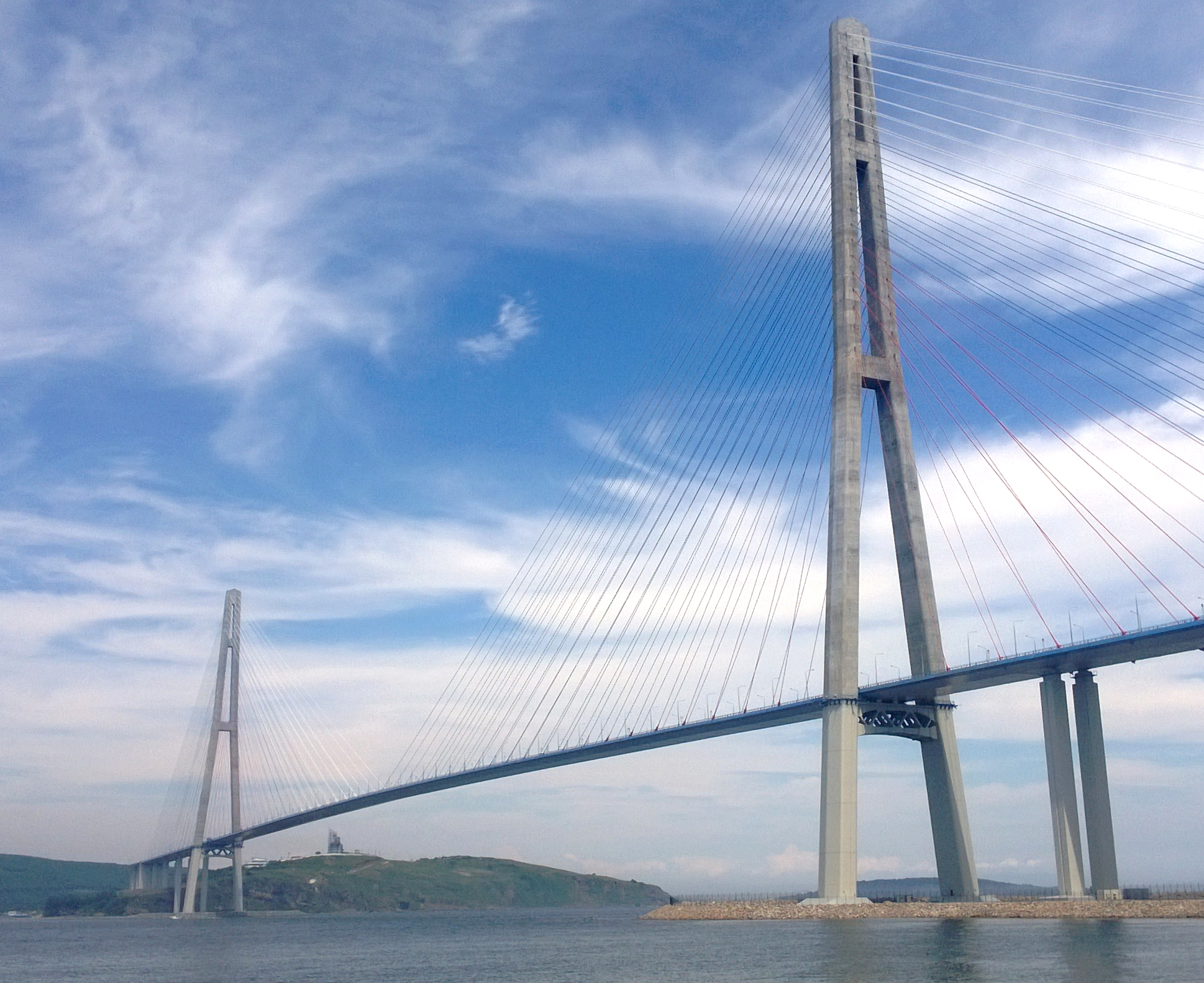
Russky Bridge

The Trans-Siberian Railway was built to connect European Russia with Vladivostok, Russia's most important Pacific Ocean port. Finished in 1905, the rail line ran from Moscow to Vladivostok via several of Russia's main cities. Part of the railway, known as the Chinese Eastern Line, crossed over into China, passing through Harbin, a major city in Manchuria. Today, Vladivostok serves as the main starting point for the Trans-Siberian portion of the Eurasian Land Bridge.

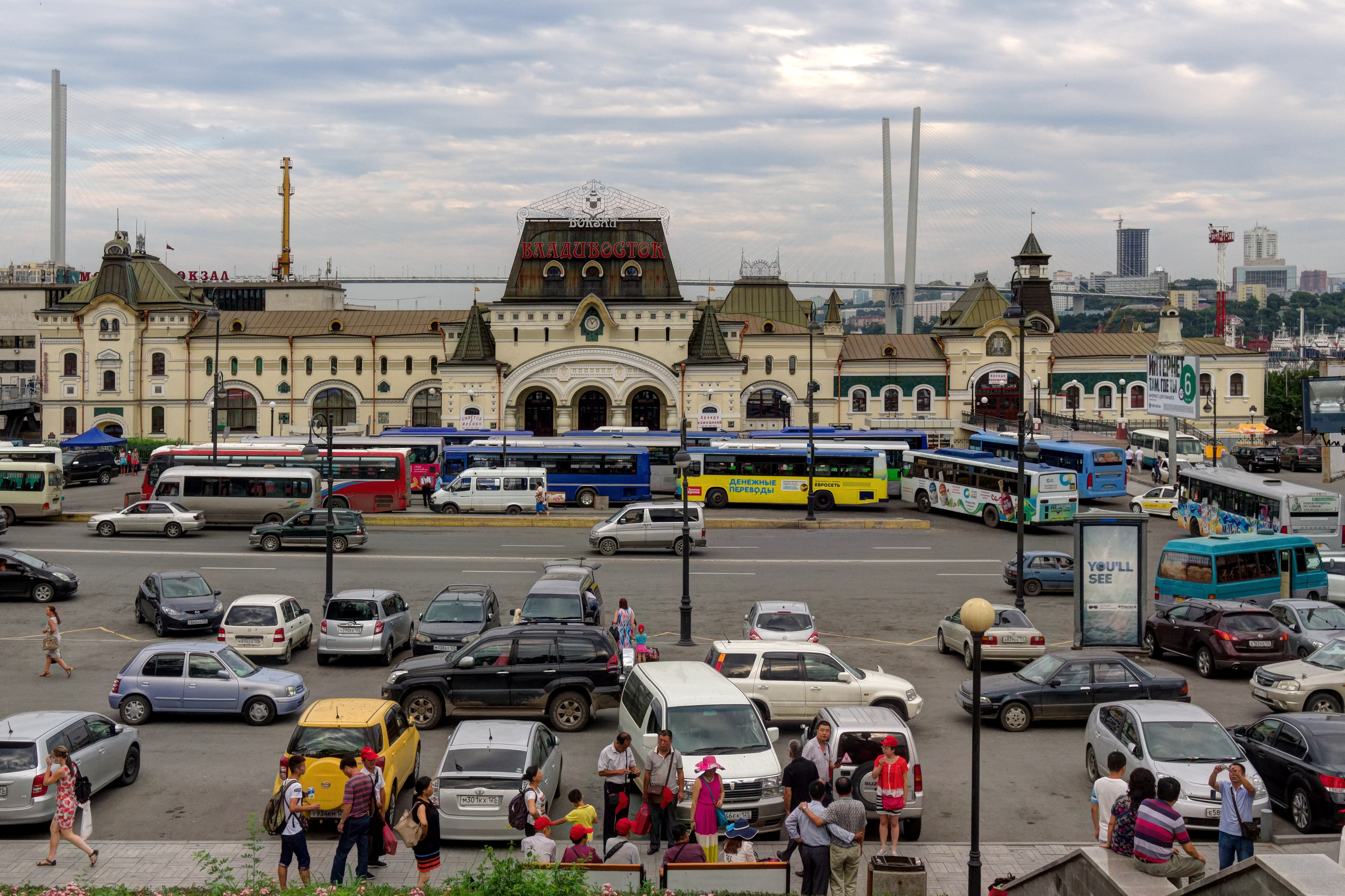
Vladivostok railway station

Vladivostok is the main air hub in the Russian Far East. Vladivostok International Airport (VVO) is the home base of Aurora, a subsidiary of Aeroflot. The airline was formed by Aeroflot in 2013 by amalgamating SAT Airlines and Vladivostok Avia. The Vladivostok International Airport was significantly upgraded in 2013 with a new 3,500-meter (11,500 ft)-long runway capable of accommodating all aircraft types without any restrictions. The Terminal A was built in 2012 with a capacity of 3.5 million passengers per year.

International flights connect Vladivostok with Japan, China, Philippines, North Korea, South Korea and Vietnam.

It is possible to get to Vladivostok from several of the larger cities in Russia. Regular flights to Seattle, Washington, were available in the 1990s but have been cancelled since. Vladivostok Air flew to Anchorage, Alaska, from July 2008 until 2013, before being transformed into Aurora.

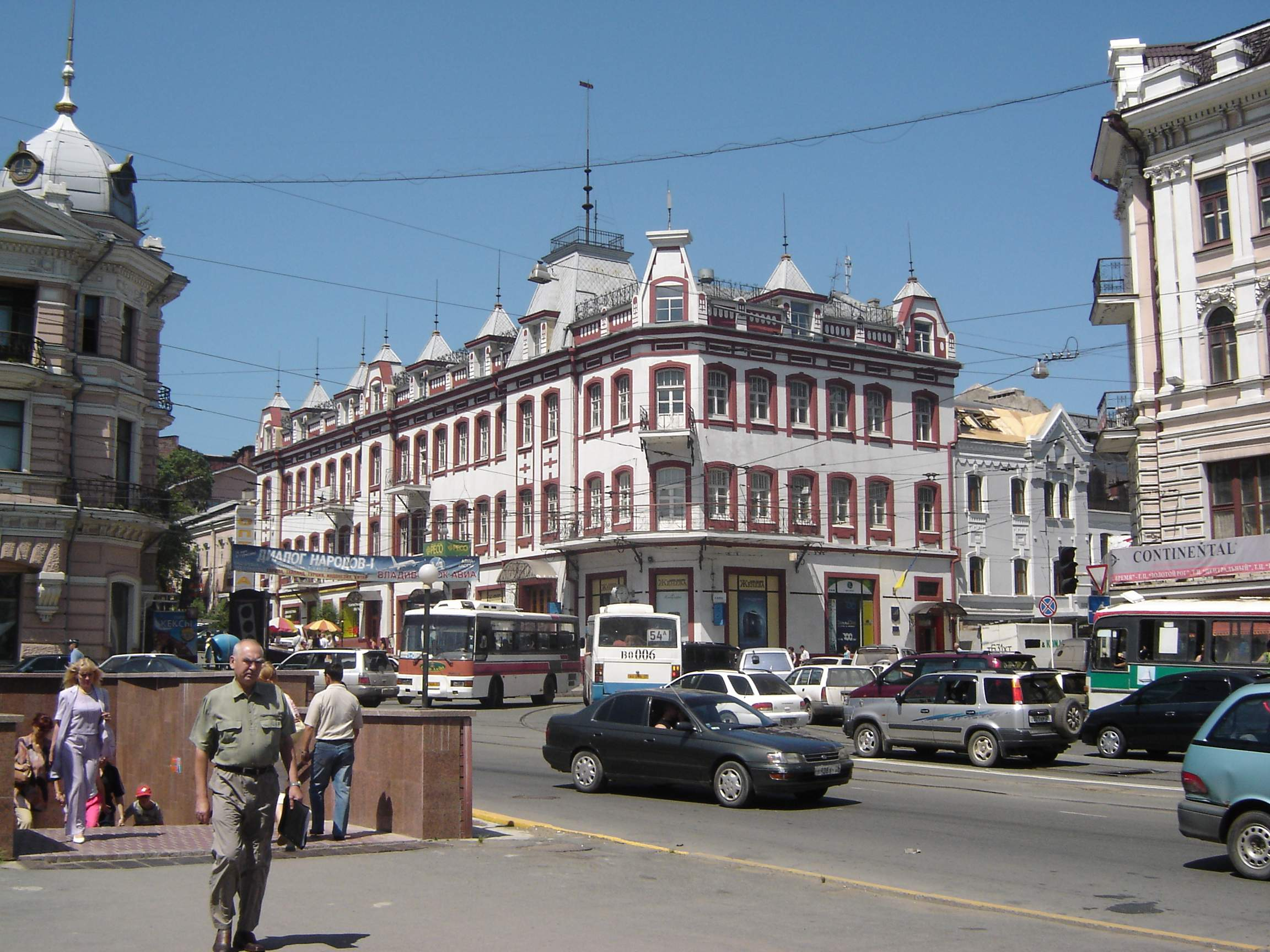
Svetlanskaya Street in the central part of Vladivostok (August 2005). Vladimir K. Arseniev Museum of Far East History on the left.

Vladivostok is the starting point of Ussuri Highway (M60) to Khabarovsk, the easternmost part of Trans-Siberian Highway that goes all the way to Moscow and Saint Petersburg via Novosibirsk. The other main highways go east to Nakhodka and south to Khasan.

=== Urban transportation ===
On June 28, 1908, Vladivostok's first tram line was started along Svetlanskaya Street, running from the railway station on Lugovaya Street. On October 9, 1912, the first wooden carriages manufactured in Belgium entered service. Today, Vladivostok's means of public transportation include trolleybus, bus, tram, train, funicular and ferryboat. The main urban traffic lines are Downtown—Vtoraya Rechka, Downtown—Pervaya Rechka—3ya Rabochaya—Balyayeva, and Downtown—Lugovaya Street.

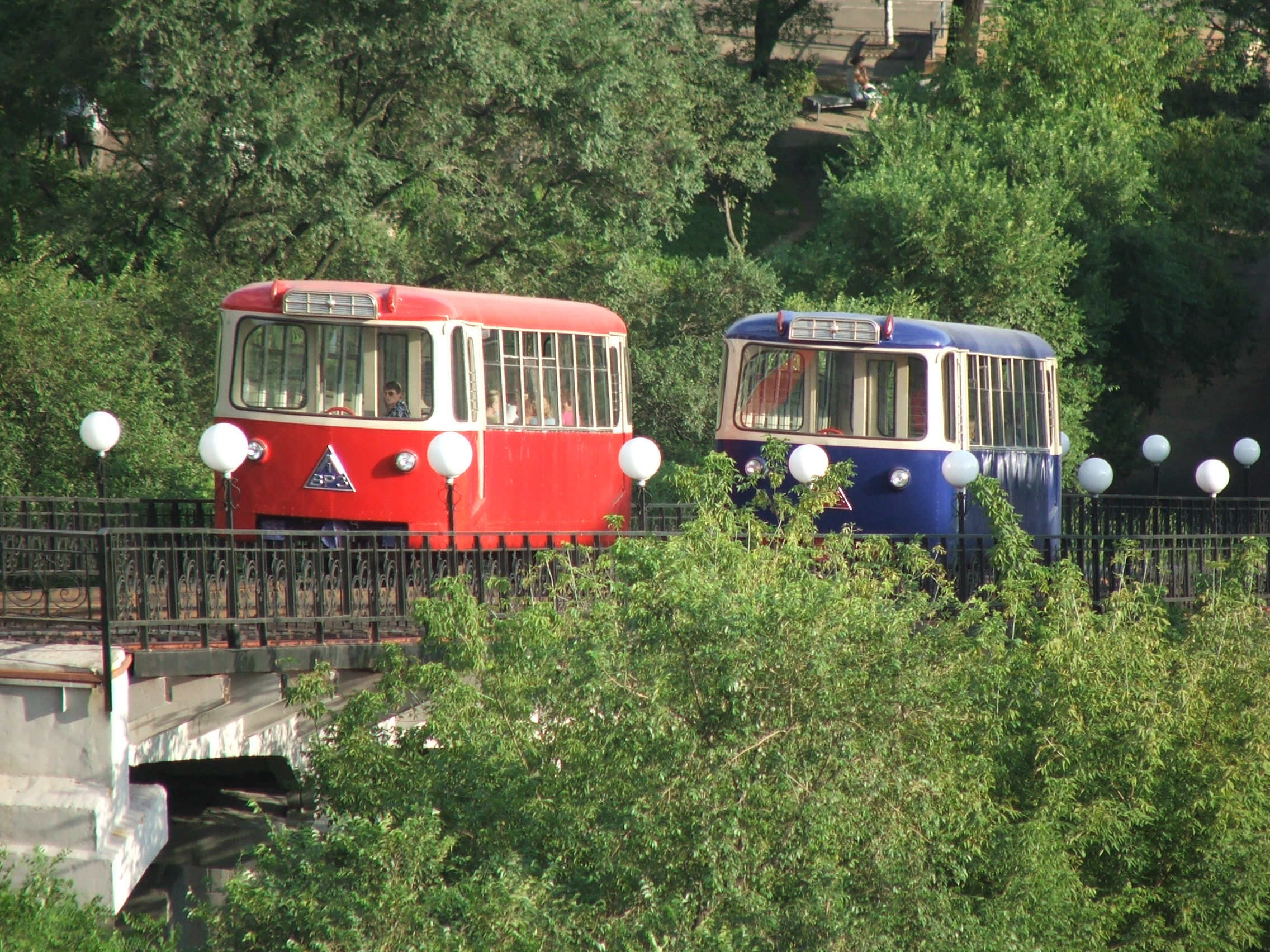
Cars of the Vladivostok funicular

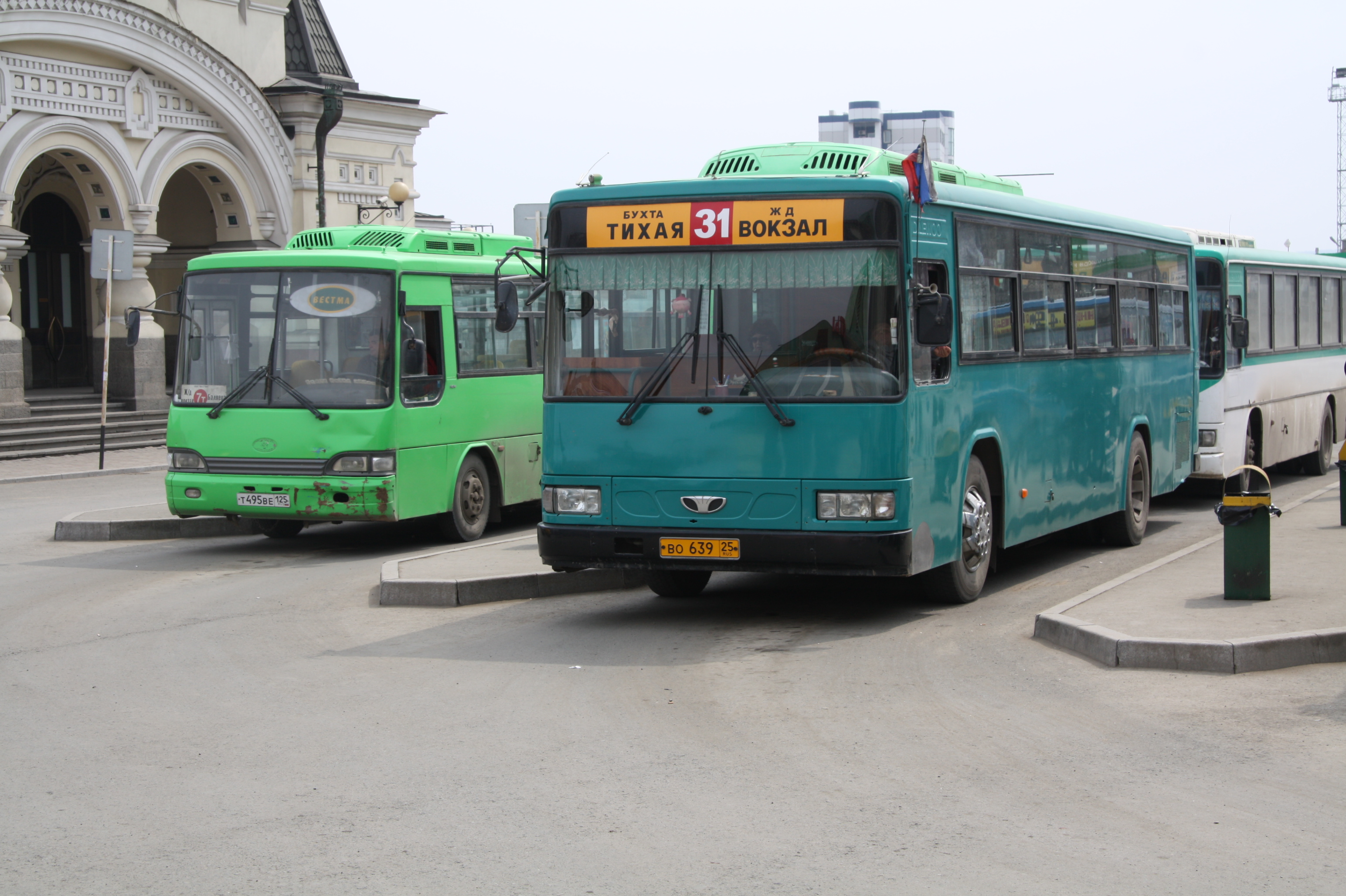
Buses in Vladivostok

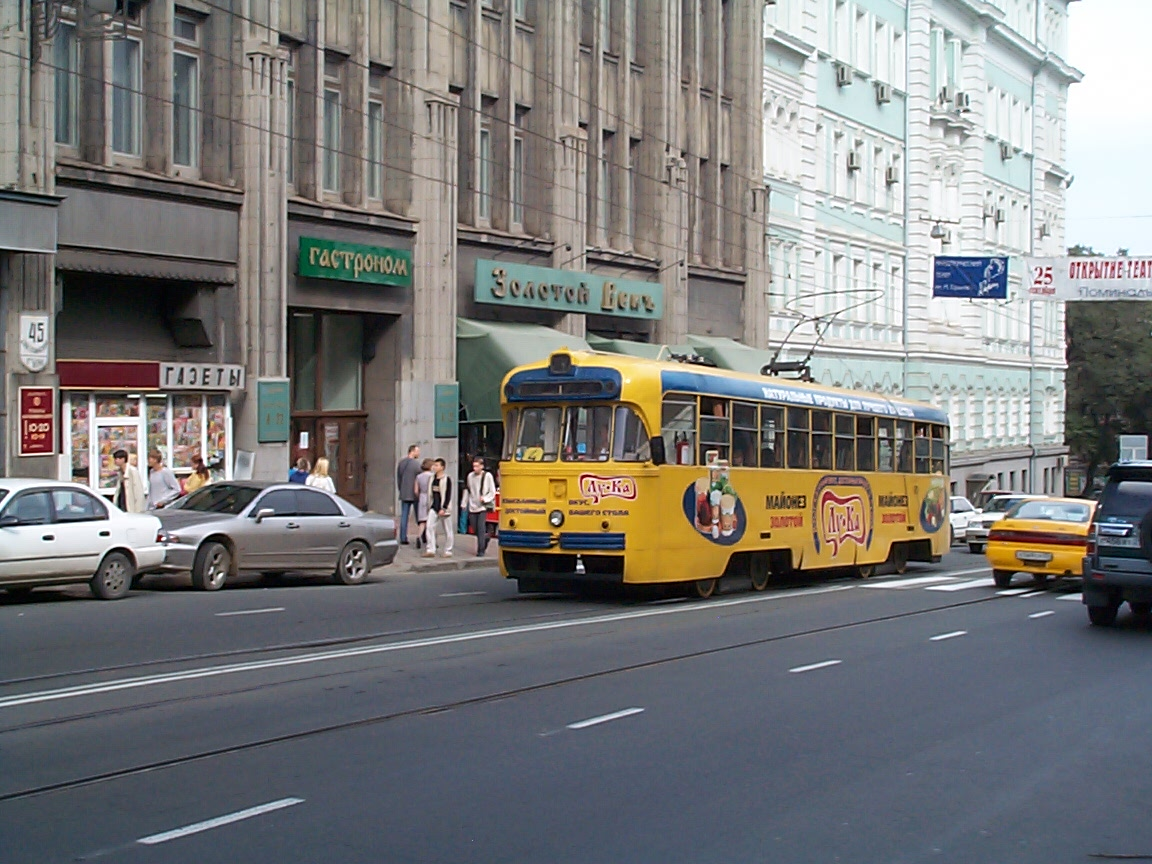
Trams in Vladivostok

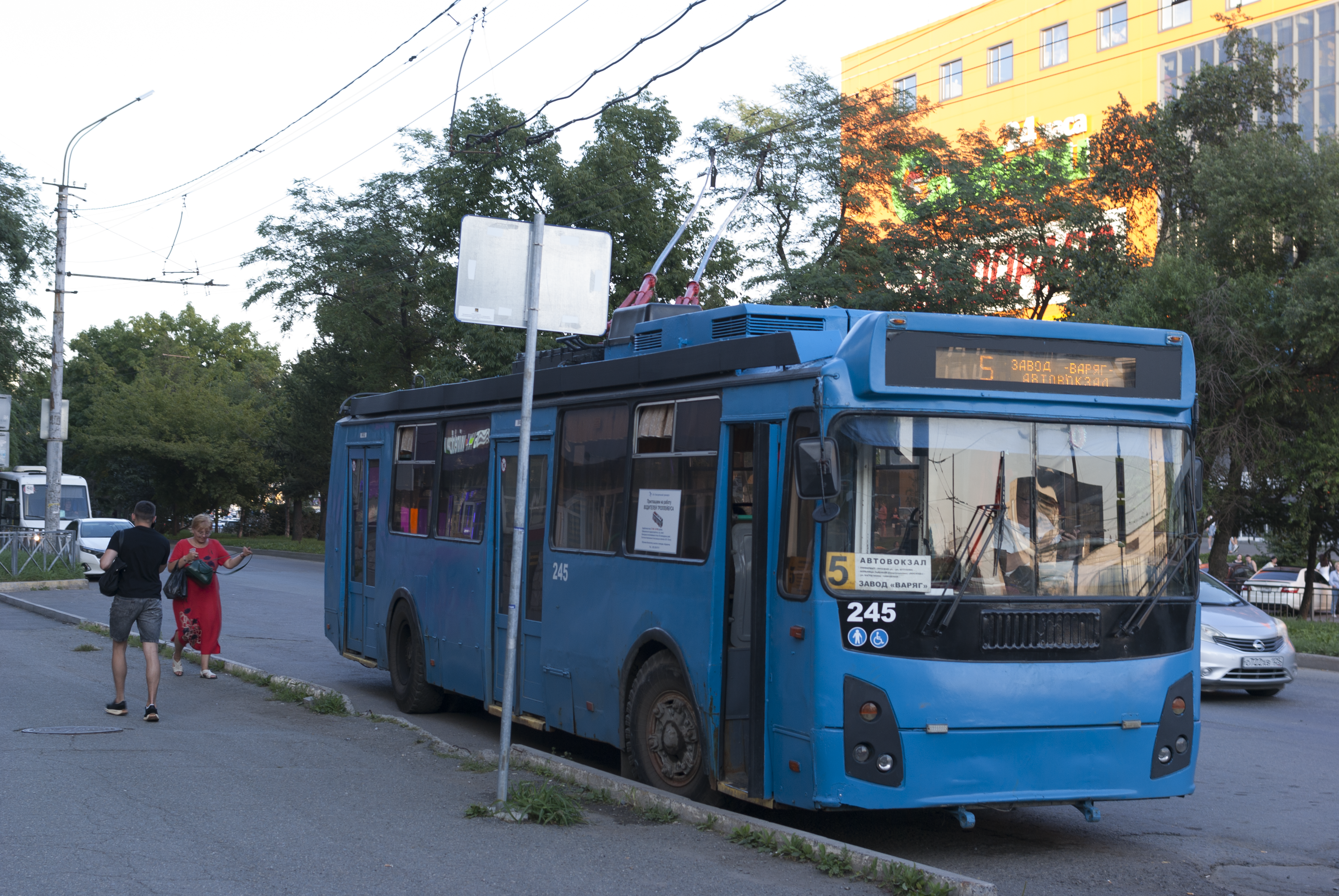
Trolleybus in Vladivostok

In 2012, Vladivostok hosted the 24th Summit of the Asia-Pacific Economic Cooperation (APEC) forum. In preparation for the event, the infrastructure of the city was renovated and improved. Two giant cable-stayed bridges were constructed in Vladivostok, namely the Zolotoy Rog Bridge over Golden Horn Bay, and the Russky Bridge from the mainland to Russky Island, where the summit took place. The latter bridge is the second longest cable-stayed bridge in the world.

== Education ==
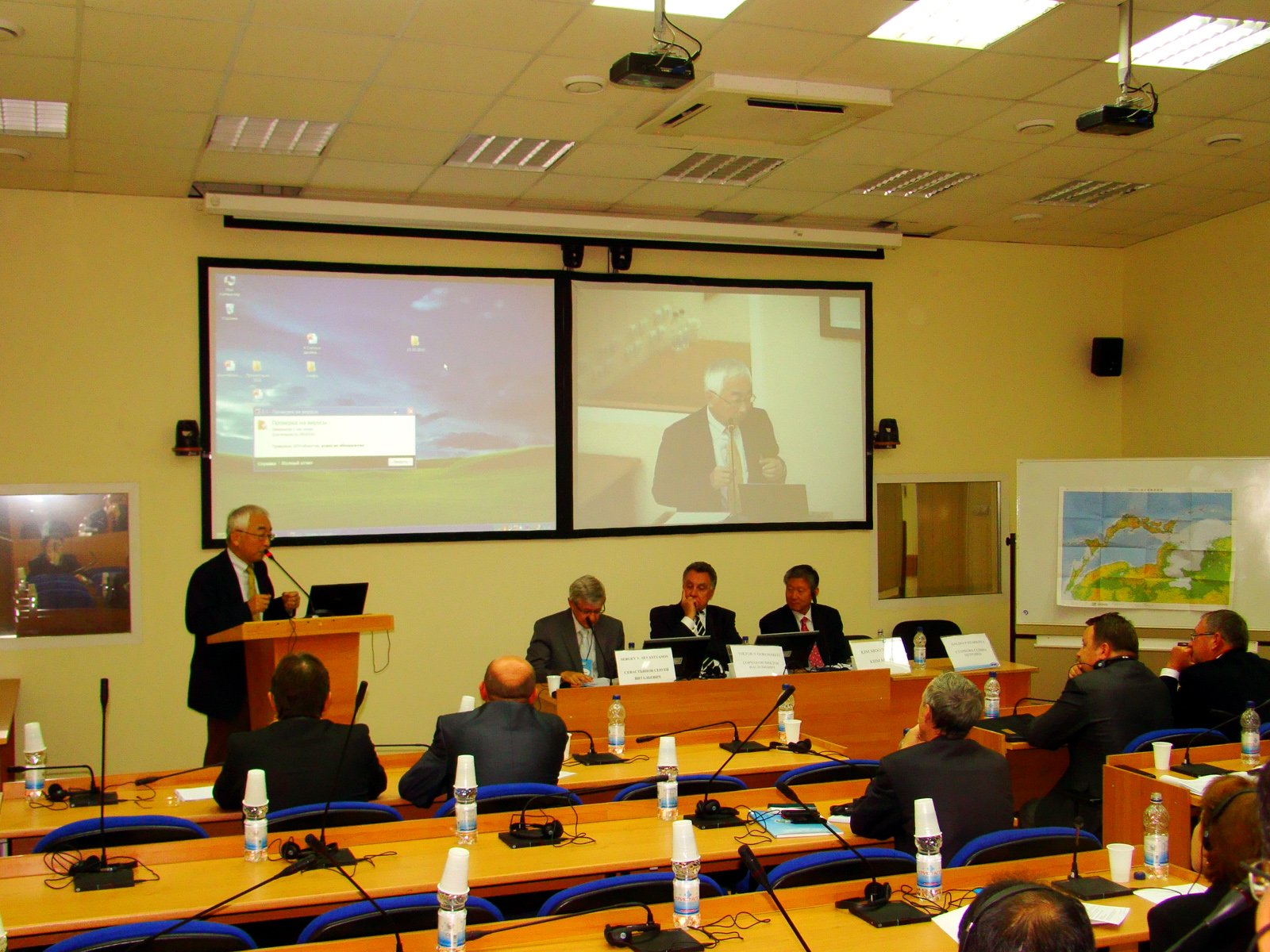
Videoconferencing in Vladivostok State University of Economics and Service

There are 114 general education institutions in Vladivostok, with a total number of students of 50,700 people (in 2015). The municipal education system of the city consists of preschool organizations, primary, basic, secondary general education schools, lyceums, gymnasiums, schools with an in-depth study of individual subjects, and centers of additional education.

The municipal educational network includes 2 gymnasiums, 2 lyceums, 13 schools with advanced study of individual subjects, one primary school, 2 basic schools, 58 secondary schools, four evening schools, and one boarding school. Three Vladivostok schools are included in the Top-500 schools of the Russian Federation. At the municipal level, there is a city system of school olympiads, a city scholarship has been established for outstanding achievements of students.

In 2016, branches of the Academy of Russian Ballet and the Nakhimov Naval School were opened.

Dozens of colleges, schools and universities provide vocational education in Vladivostok. The beginning of higher education was laid in the city with the founding of the Oriental Institute. At the moment, the largest university in Vladivostok is the Far Eastern Federal University. More than 41,000 students study in it, 5,000 employees work, including 1,598 teachers. It accounts for a large share (64%) of scientific publications among Far Eastern universities.

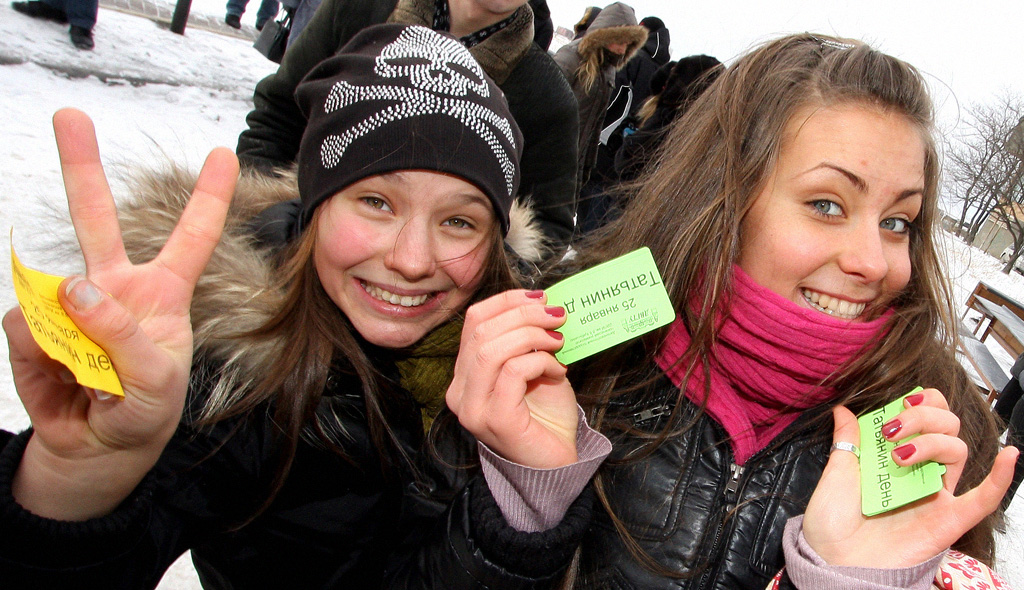
Students in Vladivostok celebrating St Tatyana's Day, or Russian Students Day

Also, higher education in the city is represented by such local universities:

- Far Eastern Federal University
- Vladivostok State University of Economics and Service
- Pacific State Medical University
- Maritime State University
- Far Eastern State Institute of Arts
- Far Eastern State Technical Fisheries University
- Pacific Higher Naval School
- Branches of the Russian Customs Academy
- The International Institute of Economics and Law
- Far Eastern Law Institute of the Ministry of Internal Affairs of Russia
- Saint Petersburg University of the State Fire Service of the Ministry of Emergencies of Russia

== Media ==
Over fifty newspapers and regional editions to Moscow publications are issued in Vladivostok. The largest newspaper of the Primorsky Krai and the whole Russian Far East is Vladivostok News with a circulation of 124,000 copies at the beginning of 1996. Its founder, joint-stock company Vladivostok-News, also issues a weekly English-language newspaper Vladivostok News. The subjects of the publications issued in these newspapers vary from information about Vladivostok and Primorye to major international events. Newspaper Zolotoy Rog (Golden Horn) gives every detail of economic news. Entertainment materials and cultural news constitute a larger part of Novosti (News) newspaper which is the most popular among Primorye's young people. Also, new online mass media about the Russian Far East for foreigners is the Far East Times. This source invites readers to take part in the informational support of R.F.E. for visitors, travellers and businessmen. Vladivostok operates many online news agencies, such as NewsVL.ru, Primamedia, Primorye24 and Vesti-Primorye. From 2012 to 2017 there operates youth online magazine Vladivostok-3000.

As of 2020, there operate nineteen radio stations, including three 24-hour local stations. Radio VBC (FM 101,7 MHz, since 1993) broadcasts classic and modern rock music, oldies and music of the 1980s–1990s. Radio Lemma (FM 102,7 MHz, since 1996) broadcasts news, radio shows and various Russian and European-American songs. Vladivostok FM (FM 106,4 MHz, was launched in 2008) broadcasts local news and popular music (Top 40). The State broadcasting company "Vladivostok" broadcasts local news and music programs from 7 to 9, from 12 to 14 and from 18 to 19 on weekdays on the frequency of Radio Rossii (Radio of Russia).

== Culture ==
=== Galleries and showrooms ===
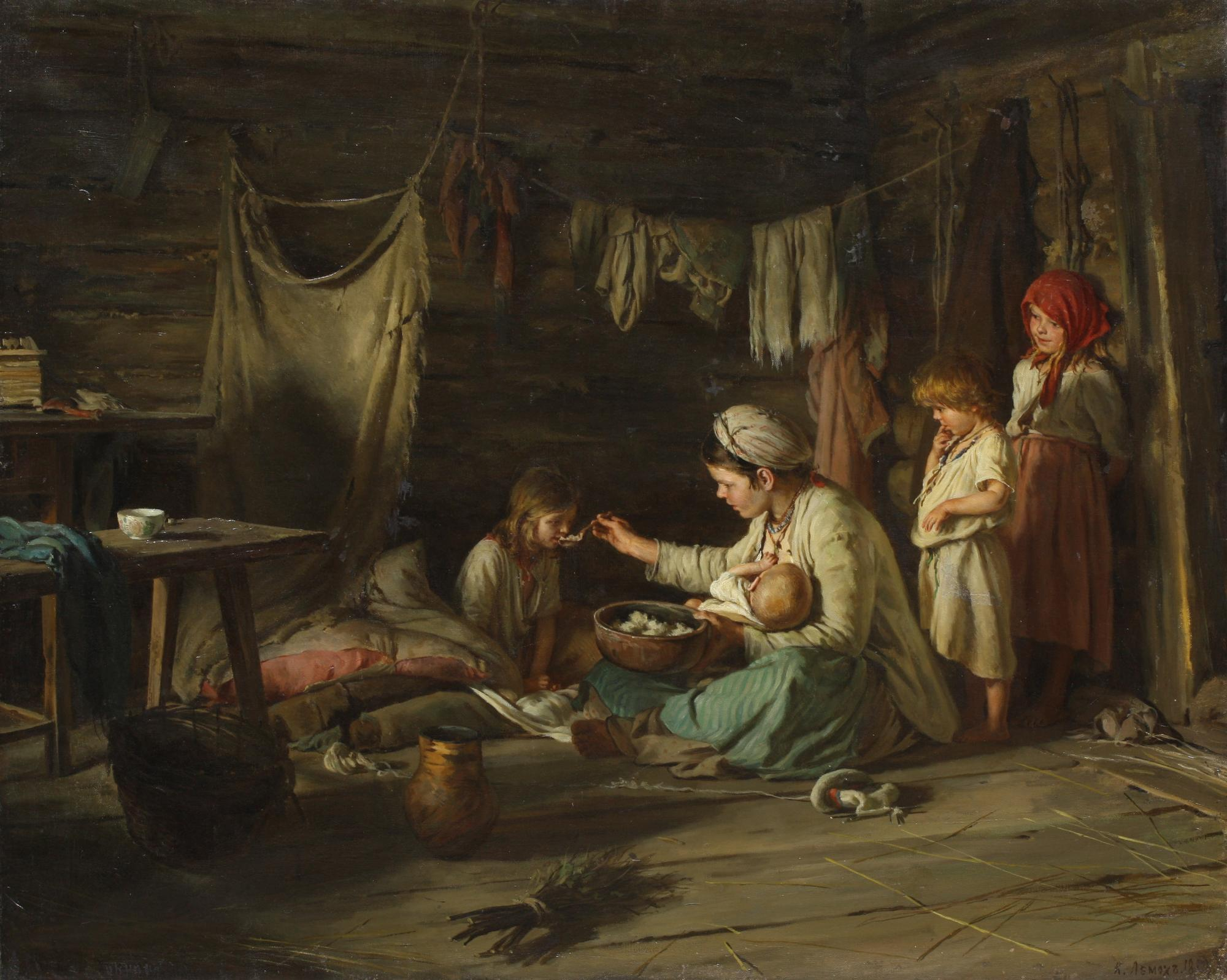
"Recovering" (1889) by Cyril Lemokh – Primorsky State Art Gallery

The active development of art museums in Vladivostok began in the 1950s. In 1960, the House of Artists was built, in which there were exhibition halls. In 1965, the Primorsky State Art Gallery was separated into a separate institution, and later, on the basis of its collection, the Children's Art Gallery was created. In Soviet times, one of the largest areas for exhibitions in Vladivostok was the exhibition hall of the Primorsky branch of the Union of Artists of Soviet Russia. In 1989 the gallery of contemporary art "Artetage" was opened.

In 1995, the Arka gallery of contemporary art was opened, the first exposition of which consisted of 100 paintings donated by the collector Alexander Glezer. The gallery participates in international exhibitions and fairs. In 2005, a non-commercial private gallery "Roytau" appeared. In recent years, the centers of contemporary art "Salt" (created on the basis of the FEFU art museum) and "Zarya", have been active.

=== Music, opera, and ballet ===
The city is home to the Vladivostok Pops Orchestra.

Russian rock band Mumiy Troll hails from Vladivostok and frequently puts on shows there. In addition, the city hosted the "VladiROCKstok" International Music Festival in September 1996. Hosted by the mayor and governor, and organized by two young American expatriates, the festival drew nearly 10,000 people and top-tier musical acts from St. Petersburg (Akvarium and DDT) and Seattle (Supersuckers, Goodness), as well as several leading local bands.

Nowadays there is another annual music festival in Vladivostok, Vladivostok Rocks International Music Festival and Conference (V-ROX). Vladivostok Rocks is a three-day open-air city festival and international conference for the music industry and contemporary cultural management. It offers the opportunity for aspiring artists and producers to gain exposure to new audiences and leading international professionals.

Musical theater in Vladivostok is represented by the Primorsky Regional Philharmonic Society, the largest concert organization in Primorsky Krai. The Philharmonic has organized the Pacific Symphony Orchestra and the Governor's Brass Orchestra. In 2013, the Primorsky Opera and Ballet Theater was opened. On January 1, 2016, it was transformed into a branch of the Mariinsky Theater. The Russian Opera House houses the State Primorsky Opera and Ballet Theater.

=== Museums ===
The Vladimir K. Arseniev Museum of Far East History, opened in 1890, is the main museum of Primorsky Krai. Besides the main facility, it has three branches in Vladivostok itself (including Arsenyev's Memorial House), and five branches elsewhere in the state. Among the items in the museum's collection are the famous 15th-century Yongning Temple Steles from the lower Amur.

=== Movie theaters ===
In 2014, 21 movie theaters operated in Vladivostok, and the total number of film screenings was 1,501,000.

Most of the city's movie theaters – Ocean, Galaktika, Moscow (formerly called New Wave movie theater), Neptune 3D (formerly called Neptune and Borodino), Illusion, Vladivostok – are renovated movie theaters built in the Soviet years. Among them stands out "Ocean" with the largest (22 by 10 meters) screen in the Far East of the country, located in the city's downtown in the area of Sports Harbor. Together with the "Ussuri" movie theater, it is the venue for the annual international film festival "Pacific Meridians" (since 2002). Since December 2014 the IMAX 3D hall has been operating in the Ocean movie theater.

=== Theaters ===
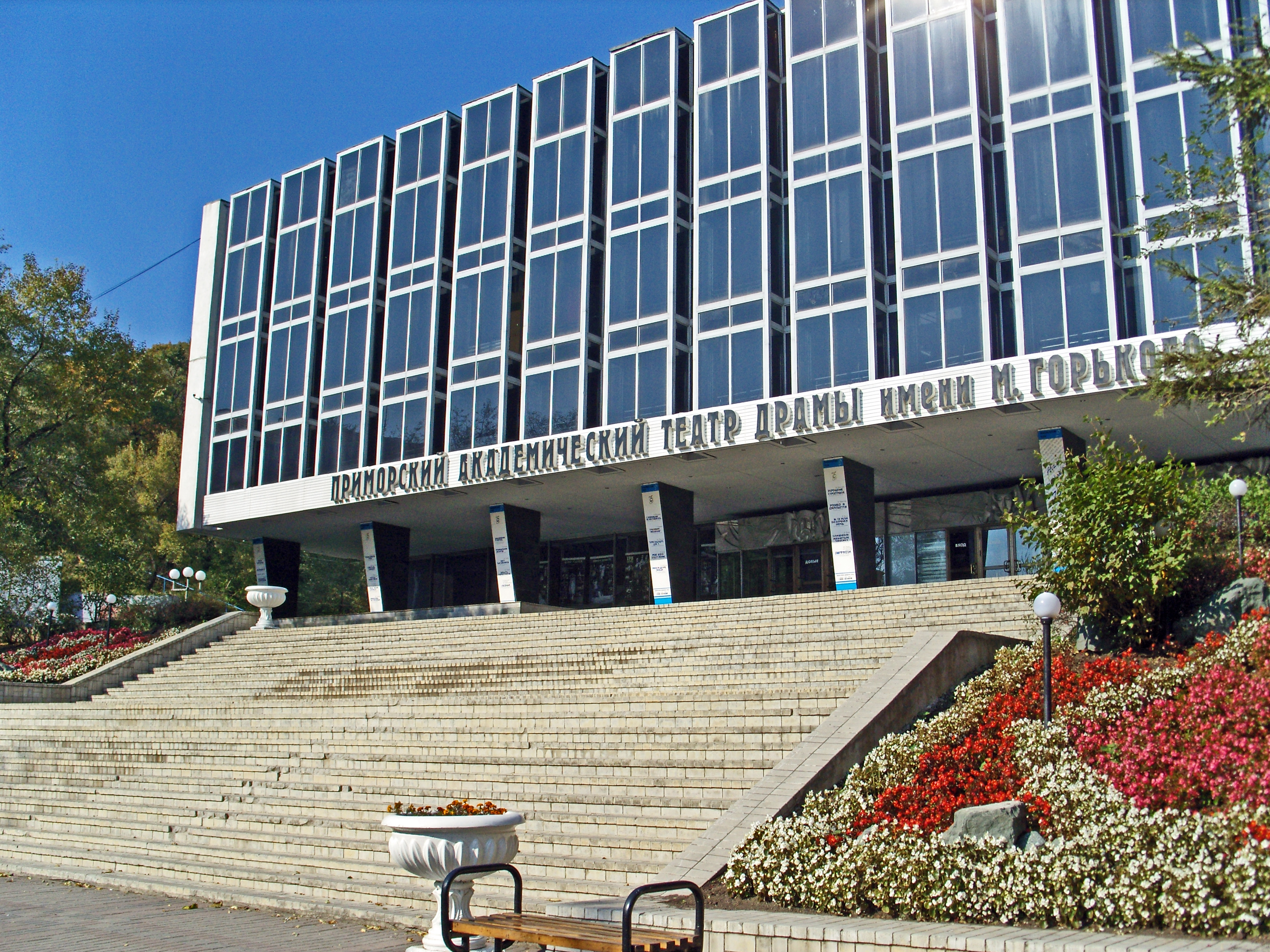
Maxim Gorky Theater

Maxim Gorky Academic Theater, named after the Russian author Maxim Gorky, was founded in 1931 and is used for drama, musical and children's theater performances.

There are five professional theaters in the city. In 2014, they were visited by 369,800 spectators. The Primorsky Regional Academic Drama Theater named after Maxim Gorky is the oldest state theater in Vladivostok, opened on November 3, 1932. The theater employs 202 people: 41 actors (of them, three folk and nine honored artists of Russia).

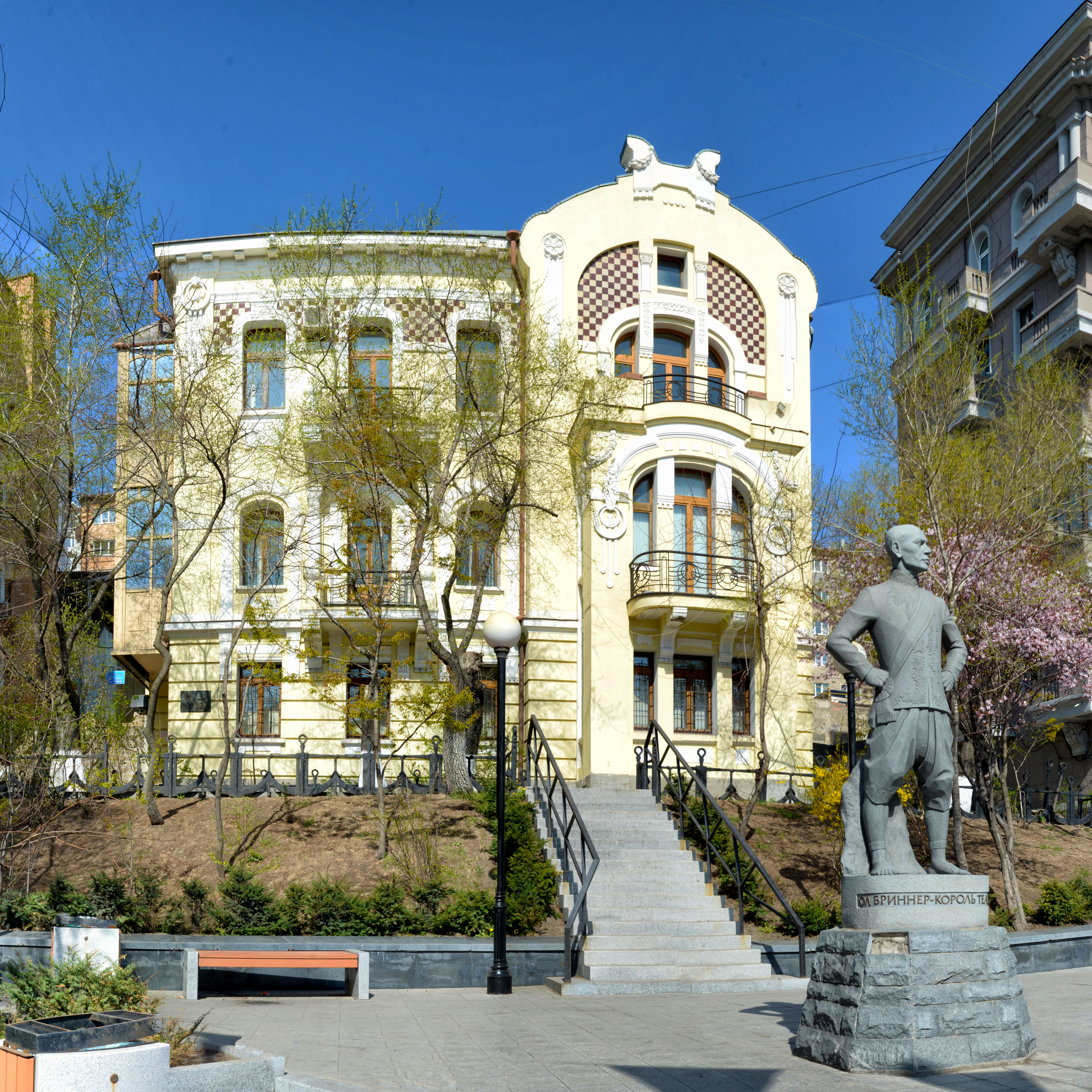
Manor of Julius Bryner, in front of which stands the statue of his grandson Juli (the actor Yul Brynner), Aleutskaya St.

The Primorsky Pushkin Theater was built in 1907–1908, and is currently one of the main cultural centers of the city. In the 1930s–40s, the following still operating ones were successively opened: the Drama Theater of the Pacific Fleet, the Primorsky Regional Puppet Theater, and the Primorsky Regional Drama Theater of Youth. The regional puppet theater gave 484 performances in 2015, which were attended by more than 52,000 spectators. There are 500 puppets in the theater, where 15 artists work. The troupe regularly goes on tour to Europe and Asia.

In September 2012, a granite statue of the actor Yul Brynner (1920–1985) was inaugurated in Yul Brynner Park, directly in front of the house where he was born at 15 Aleutskaya St.

== Parks and squares ==
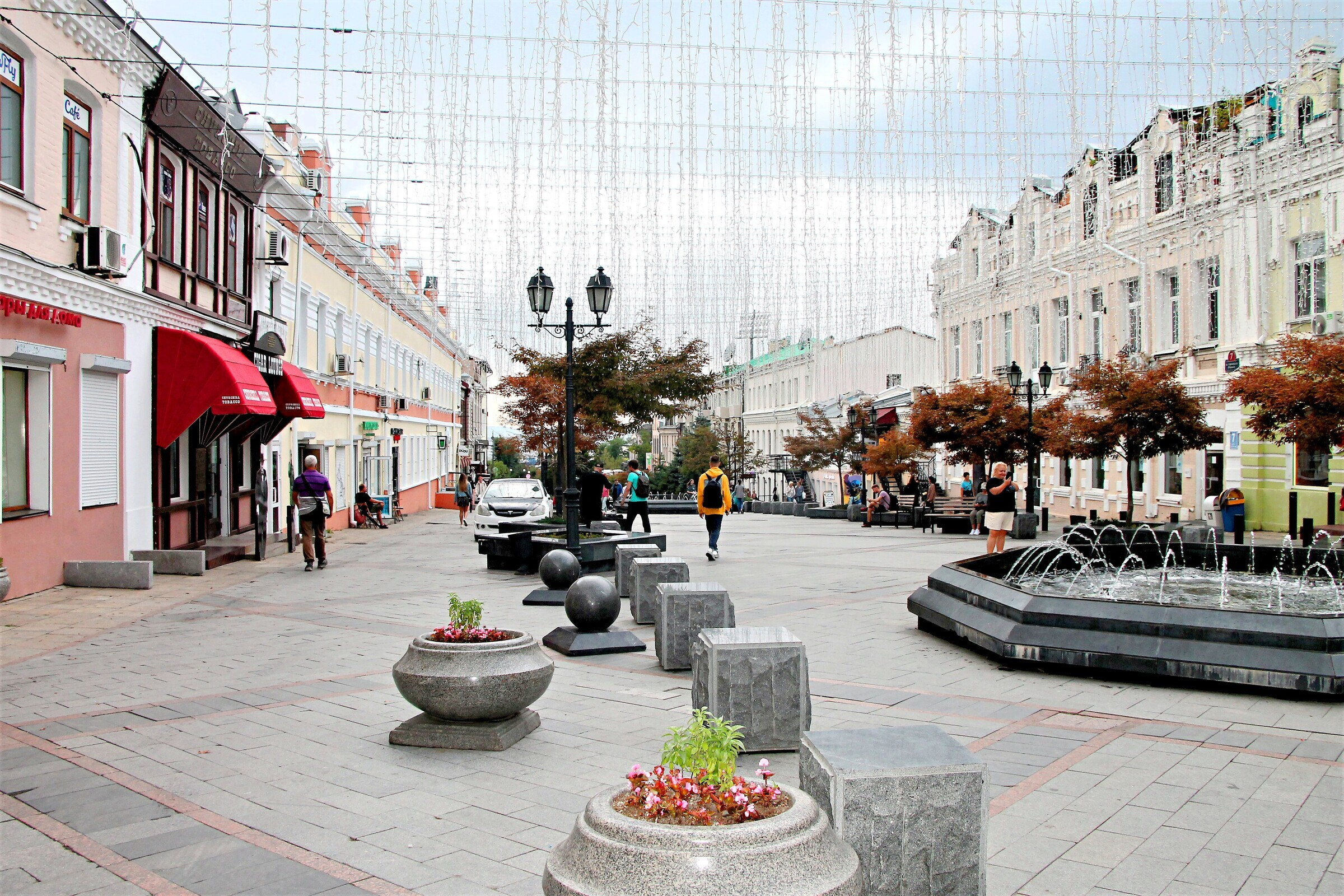
Admirala Fokina Street (2021)

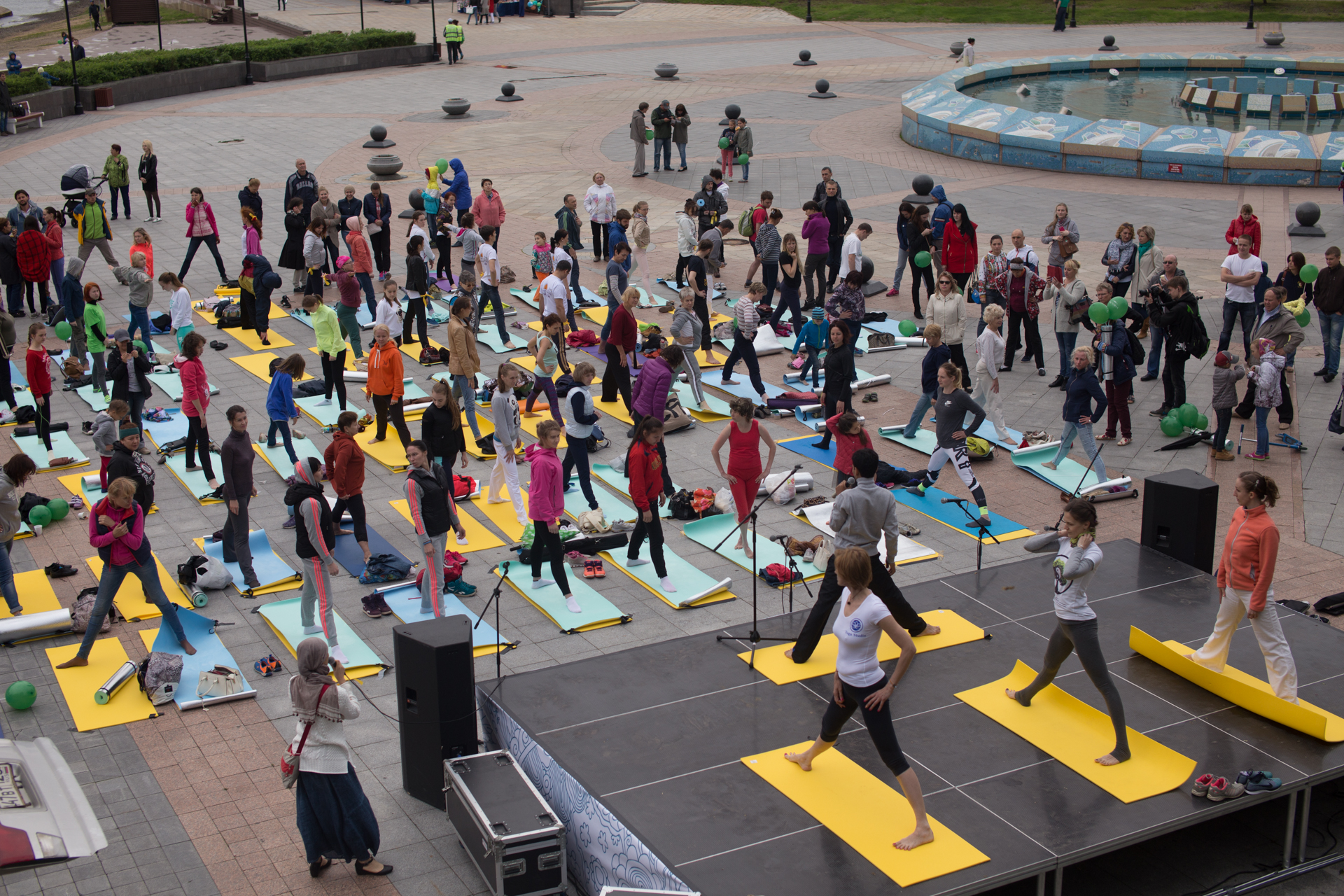
Practicing yoga on Yoga Day in Vladivostok, 2016

Parks and squares in Vladivostok include Pokrovskiy Park, Minnyy Gorodok, Detskiy Razvlekatelnyy Park, Park of Sergeya Lazo, Admiralskiy Skver, Skver im. Neveskogo, Nagornyy Park, Skver im. Sukhanova, Fantaziya Park, Skver Rybatskoy Slavy, Skver im. A.I.Shchetininoy.

=== Pokrovskiy Park ===
Pokrovskiy Park was once a cemetery. It was converted into a park in 1934 but was closed in 1990. Since 1990, the land the park sits on belongs to the Russian Orthodox Church. During the rebuilding of the Orthodox Church, graves were found.

=== Minny Gorodok ===
Minny Gorodok is a 91-acre (37 ha) public park. Minny Gorodok means "Mine Borough Park" in English. The park is a former military base that was founded in 1880. The military base was used for storing mines in underground storage. Converted into a park in 1985, Minny Gorodok contains several lakes, ponds, and an ice-skating rink.

=== Detsky Razvlekatelny Park ===
Detsky Razvlekatelny Park is a children's amusement park located near Downtown Vladivostok. The park contains a carousel, gaming machines, a Ferris wheel, cafés, an aquarium, movie theater and a stadium.

=== Admiralsky Skver ===
Admiralsky Skver is a landmark located near Downtown Vladivostok. The Square is an open space, dominated by the Triumfalnaya Arka. South of the square sits a museum of Soviet submarine S-56.

== Sports ==
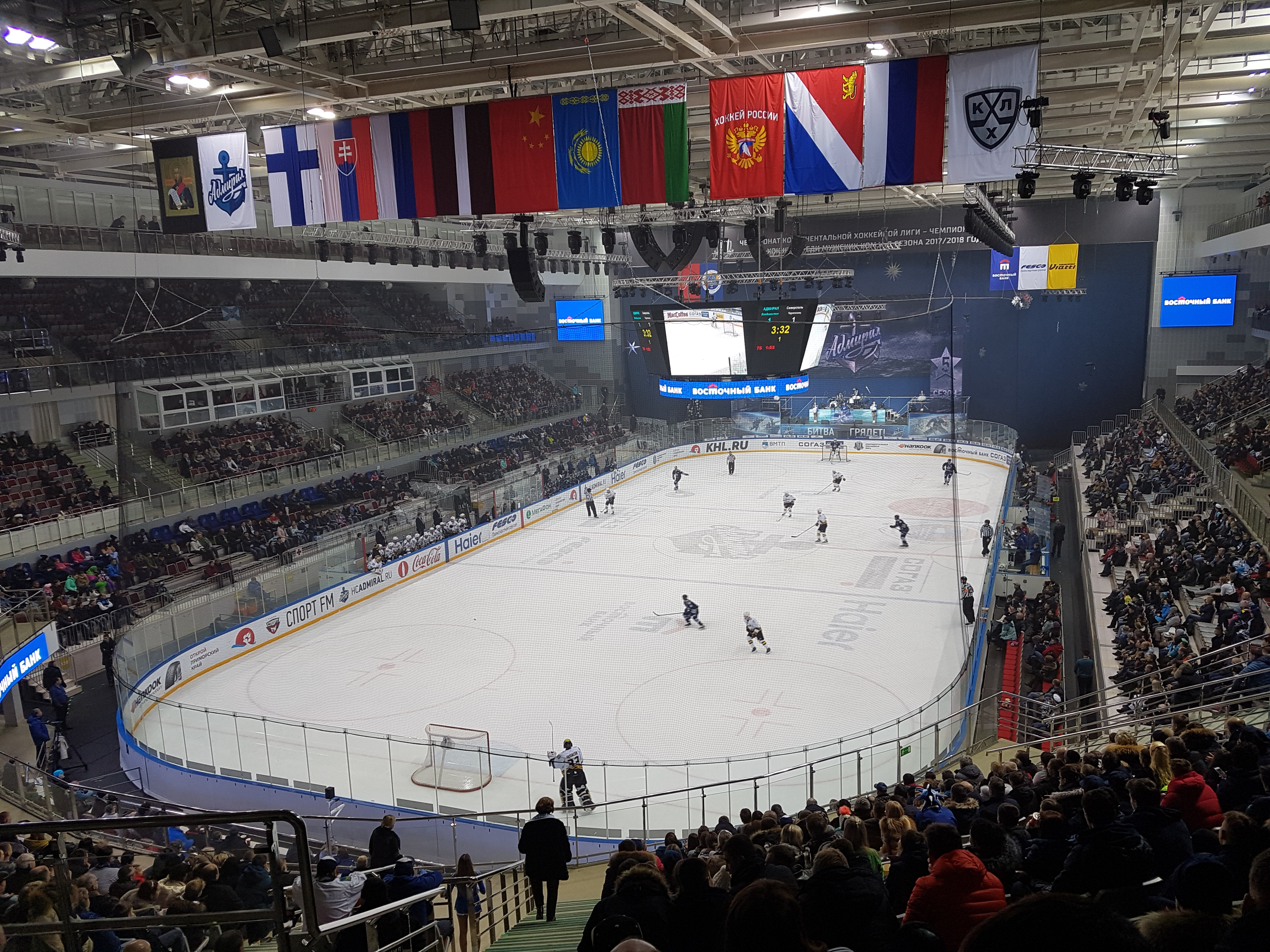
Fetisov Arena in Vladivostok in December 2017

Vladivostok is home to the football club Dynamo Vladivostok, which plays in the Russian Second Division, ice hockey club Admiral Vladivostok from the Kontinental Hockey League's Chernyshev Division, and basketball club Spartak Primorye, of the Russian Basketball Super League. Former Russian Premier League football club Luch Vladivostok used to be the main football team of the city until its bankruptcy in 2020. It is also home to the Vostok Vladivostok motorcycle speedway club.

Vladivostok annually hosts various contests. In 2022, the 35th Regatta boat for the Goblet of Peter the Great and the 19th Russian Championship of Conrad-25R yachts were held.

== Pollution ==
Local ecologists from the Ecocenter organization have claimed that much of Vladivostok's suburbs are polluted and that living in them can be classified as a health hazard. The pollution has a number of causes, according to Ecocenter geochemical expert Sergey Shlykov. Vladivostok has about eighty industrial sites, which may not be many compared to Russia's most industrialized areas, but those around the city are particularly environmentally unfriendly, such as shipbuilding and repairing, power stations, printing, fur farming, and mining.

In addition, Vladivostok has particularly vulnerable geography which compounds the effect of pollution. Winds cannot clear pollution from some of the most densely populated areas around the Pervaya and Vtoraya Rechka as they sit in basins which the winds blow over. In addition, there is little snow in winter and no leaves or grass to catch the dust to make it settle down.

== Twin towns – sister cities ==
Vladivostok is twinned with:

- Akita, Japan
- Busan, South Korea
- Dalian, China
- Hakodate, Japan
- Harbin, China
- Ho Chi Minh City, Vietnam
- Incheon, South Korea
- Juneau, United States
- Kota Kinabalu, Malaysia
- Manta, Ecuador
- Niigata, Japan
- Pohang, South Korea
- San Diego, United States
- Tacoma, United States
- Tskhinvali, South Ossetia
- Vladikavkaz, Russia
- Wonsan, North Korea
- Yanbian, China

In 2010, arches with the names of each of Vladivostok's twin towns were placed in a park within the city.

From Vladivostok ferry port next to the train station, a ferry of the DBS Cruise Ferry travels regularly to Donghae, South Korea and from there to Sakaiminato on the Japanese main island of Honshu.

== Notable people ==
- Alexandra Biriukova (1895–1967), architect
- Alexei Volkonski (born 1978), canoeist
- Anna Shchetinina (1908–1999), captain
- Chŏng Sangjin (1918–2013), Korean freedom fighter
- Diana Ankudinova (born May 31, 2003), singer
- Elmar Lohk (1901–1963), architect
- Eugene Kozlovsky (1946–2023), writer
- Feliks Gromov (1937–2021), admiral
- Igor Ansoff (1918–2002), mathematician
- Igor Kunitsyn (born 1981), tennis player
- Igor Tamm (1895–1971), physicist
- Ilya Lagutenko (born 1968), singer
- Ivan Vasiliev (born 1989), ballet dancer
- Kristina Rihanoff (born 1977), dancer
- Ksenia Kahnovich (born 1987), model
- Lev Knyazev (1924–2012), writer
- Liah Greenfeld (born 1954), academic
- Lilia Akhaimova (born 1997), gymnast
- Mary Losseff (1907–1972), singer, film actor
- Mikhail Koklyaev (born 1978), strongman
- Natalia Pogonina (born 1985), chess player
- Nikolay Dubinin (1907–1998), biologist
- Paul Portnyagin (1903–1977), Greek-Catholic priest, teacher and orientalist
- Peter A. Boodberg (1903–1972), scholar, linguist
- Stanislav Petrov (1939–2017), soldier, averted nuclear war
- Svoy (born 1980), musician
- Swathi Reddy (born 1987), Indian actress
- Victor Zotov (1908–1977), botanist
- Vitali Kravtsov (born 1999), ice hockey forward
- Vladimir Arsenyev (1872–1930), explorer
- Vladimir Ossipoff (1907–1998), architect
- Wes Hurley (born 1981), filmmaker
- Yi Dong-hwi (1873–1935), Korean communist
- Yul Brynner (1920–1985), film actor

== See also ==
- 32nd Rifle Division (Soviet Union)
- List of North Asian ports
