= List of bridges in Russia =

This is a list of bridges and viaducts in Russia, including those for pedestrians and vehicular traffic.

== Major road and railway bridges ==
This table presents the structures greater than 1,000 meters (non-exhaustive list).

	Name	Span	Length	Type	Carries Crosses	Opened	Location	Ref.
1	Crimean Rail Bridge	227 m (745 ft)	18,118.05 m (59,442.4 ft)	Arch; Steel tied-arch	Bagerovo–Vyshestebliyevskaya railway Kerch Strait	2019	Taman – Kerch; 45°18′30.8″N 36°30′20.6″E	
2	Crimean Road Bridge (destroyed)	227 m (745 ft)	16,857.28 m (55,306.0 ft)	Arch; Steel tied-arch	A290 highway Kerch Strait	2018	Taman – Kerch; 45°18′31.6″N 36°30′22.5″E	
3	Southern overpass of the Western High-Speed Diameter		9,378 m (30,768 ft)		8 lanes road bridge Neva	2016		
4	Northern overpass of the Western High-Speed Diameter		8,794.5 m (28,853 ft)		8 lanes road bridge Neva	2016		
5	Tongjiang-Nizhneleninskoye railway bridge		7,194 m (23,602 ft)		Railway bridge Amur	2022		
6	President Bridge	221 m (725 ft)(x25)	5,825 m (19,111 ft)	Truss bridge Steel	4 lanes road bridge Volga	2009	Ulyanovsk; 54°21′39.3″N 48°26′16.8″E	
7	Moscow Monorail overpass		4,698 m (15,413 ft)		Railway bridge	2004		
8	Lena Bridge under construction		4,610 m (15,120 ft)		2 lanes road bridge Lena	2028		
9	Amur Bay Bridge		4,364 m (14,318 ft)		4 lanes road bridge Amur Bay	2012		
10	Yuribey Bridge		3,893 m (12,772 ft)		Railway bridge Yuribey	2009		
11	Khabarovsk Bridge		3,891 m (12,766 ft)		Railway bridge 4 lanes road bridge Amur	1916; 1999		
12	Volga Bridge (Tolyatti bypass)		3,750 m (12,300 ft)		4 lanes road bridge Volga	2024		
13	Jubilee Bridge		3,510 m (11,520 ft)		4 lanes road bridge Volga	2010		
14	Volga Bridge (M12)		3,362 m (11,030 ft)		4 lanes road bridge Volga	2023		
15	Russky Bridge	1,104 m (3,622 ft)	3,100 m (10,200 ft)	Cable-stayed; Steel box girder deck, concrete pylons	4 lanes road bridge Eastern Bosphorus	2012	Vladivostok; 43°03′48.2″N 131°54′27.9″E	
16	Bolshoy Obukhovsky Bridge	382 m (1,253 ft)	2,824 m (9,265 ft)	Cable-stayed; Steel box girder deck, steel pylons Twin bridges	Saint Petersburg Ring Road; Neva	2004; 2007	Saint Petersburg; 59°51′13.7″N 30°29′33.5″E	
17	Saratov Bridge	166 m (545 ft)(x3)	2,804 m (9,199 ft)	Arch; Concrete deck arch	3 lanes road bridge Volga	1965	Saratov - Engels; 51°31′19.0″N 46°04′02.6″E	
18	East Exit Bridge		2,670 m (8,760 ft)		4 lanes road bridge Ufa	2024		
19	Krasnaya Polyana Railway Bridge		2,517 m (8,258 ft)		Railway bridge	2013		
20	Volgograd Bridge	157 m (515 ft)(x3)	2,514 m (8,248 ft)	Box girder Steel; Twin bridges	4 lanes road bridge Volga	2009	Volgograd; 48°43′17.3″N 44°33′02.6″E	
21	Big Sursky Bridge		1,242 m (4,075 ft); 2,416 m (7,927 ft)		2 lanes road bridge 2 lanes road bridge Volga	2012; 2024		
22	New Saratov Bridge	157 m (515 ft)(x3)	2,351 m (7,713 ft)	Box girder Steel; 10x126+3x157+3x126 Twin bridges	4 lanes road bridge Volga	2000; 2009	Saratov - Engels; 51°35′33.7″N 46°12′49.7″E	
23	Temernitsky Bridge		2,255 m (7,398 ft)		6 lanes road bridge Don	2010		
24	Staromatsestinsky viaduct		2,208 m (7,244 ft)		2 lanes road viaduct	2013		
25	Novosibirsk Metro Bridge		2,145 m (7,037 ft)		Railway bridge Ob	2013		
26	Yugra Bridge	408 m (1,339 ft)	2,110 m (6,920 ft)	Cable-stayed; Steel box girder deck, steel pylon	2 lanes road bridge Ob	2000	Surgut; 61°13′03.7″N 73°09′36.5″E	
27	Bugrinsky Bridge	380 m (1,250 ft)	2,097 m (6,880 ft)	Arch; Steel tied-arch Bow-string bridge	6 lanes road bridge Ob	2014	Novosibirsk; 54°58′29.8″N 82°57′44.1″E	
28	Imperial Bridge		2,089 m (6,854 ft)		Railway bridge 2 lanes road bridge Volga	1916; 1958		
29	Yugra railway bridge		2,010 m (6,590 ft)		Railway bridge Ob	1975		
30	Tura Bridge		1,965 m (6,447 ft)		2 lanes road bridge Tura	2008		
31	Zeya New Bridge		1,932 m (6,339 ft)		2 lanes road bridge Zeya	2023		
32	Don Bridge		1,901 m (6,237 ft)		4 lanes road bridge Don	2023		
33	Second flyover bridge		1,883 m (6,178 ft)		6 lanes road bridge Pregolya	2011		
34	Syzran Bridge	109 m (358 ft)(x13)	1,483 m (4,865 ft)	Truss bridge Steel	Kuybyshev Railway; Volga	1880	Syzran; 53°10′24.8″N 48°47′49.9″E	
35	Zhivopisny Bridge	409 m (1,342 ft)	1,460 m (4,790 ft)	Cable-stayed; Steel box girder deck, steel arch pylon	8 lanes road bridge Krasnoprenensky avenue Moskva	2007	Moscow; 55°46′34.6″N 37°26′36.0″E	
36	Murom Bridge	231 m (758 ft)(x2)	1,393 m (4,570 ft)	Cable-stayed; Composite steel/concrete deck, 3 concrete pylons 108+2x231+108	2 lanes road bridge P72; Oka	2009	Murom; 55°37′04.3″N 42°04′05.2″E	
37	Zolotoy Bridge	737 m (2,418 ft)	1,388.09 m (4,554.1 ft)	Cable-stayed; Steel box girder deck, concrete pylons	6 lanes road bridge Zolotoy Rog	2012	Vladivostok; 43°06′32.7″N 131°53′46.8″E	
38	Irtych River Bridge	231 m (758 ft)	1,316 m (4,318 ft)	Arch; Steel through arch	2 lanes road bridge Irtysh	2004	Khanty-Mansiysk; 60°59′20.3″N 68°58′49.9″E	
39	Murom Highway Bridge under construction	254 m (833 ft)	1,300 m (4,300 ft)	Cable-stayed; Composite steel/concrete deck, concrete pylons	M12 highway Oka		Murom; 55°37′16.1″N 42°04′28.0″E	
40	Kostroma Bridge	148 m (486 ft)	1,236 m (4,055 ft)	Box girder Prestressed concrete Twin bridges	4 lanes road bridge Volga	1972	Kostroma; 57°45′09.4″N 40°56′18.4″E	
41	Finland Railway Bridge	100 m (330 ft)(x3)	1,139 m (3,737 ft)	Arch; Steel through arch Vertical-lift bridge	Railway bridge Neva	1912	Saint Petersburg; 59°54′55.5″N 30°24′33.4″E	

== Other road and railway bridges ==
This table presents the structures with spans greater than 100 meters (non-exhaustive list).

	Name	Span	Length	Type	Carries Crosses	Opened	Location	Ref.
1	Betancourt Bridge	173 m (568 ft)	940 m (3,080 ft)	Cable-stayed; Steel	6 lanes road bridge Little Neva	2018	Saint Petersburg; 59°57′24.5″N 30°15′54.4″E	
2	October Bridge (Krasnoyarsk)	200 m (660 ft)	900 m (3,000 ft)	Box girder Steel; Twin bridges	8 lanes road bridge Yenisey	1986	Krasnoyarsk; 56°01′07.7″N 92°57′04.4″E	
3	Millennium Bridge (Kazan)	100 m (330 ft)(x2)	835 m (2,740 ft)	Cable-stayed; Steel box girder deck, steel pylons Twin bridges	6 lanes road bridge Kazanka	2005	Kazan; 55°48′24.0″N 49°08′35.8″E	
4	October Bridge (Cherepovets)	194 m (636 ft)	781 m (2,562 ft)	Cable-stayed; Steel beam deck, steel pylon	6 lanes road bridge P104; Sheksna	1979	Cherepovets; 59°06′49.4″N 37°54′12.3″E	
5	Samsonovski Bridge	189 m (620 ft)	710 m (2,330 ft)	Arch; Steel through arch 84+189+84	2 lanes road bridge Irtysh	2004	Tara; 56°57′31.9″N 74°23′26.7″E	
6	Korabelny Fairway Bridge	320 m (1,050 ft)	622 m (2,041 ft)	Cable-stayed; Composite steel/concrete deck, concrete pylons 150+320+150	Western High-Speed Diameter; Neva; Korabelny Fairway	2016	Saint Petersburg; 59°55′10.2″N 30°12′39.3″E	
7	Petrovsky Fairway Bridge	240 m (790 ft)	580 m (1,900 ft)	Cable-stayed; Composite steel/concrete deck, concrete pylons	Western High-Speed Diameter; Neva; Petrovsky Fairway	2016	Saint Petersburg; 59°57′59.0″N 30°12′59.4″E	
8	Kimry Bridge	128 m (420 ft)(x2)	554 m (1,818 ft)	Box girder Prestressed concrete with cable-stays	4 lanes road bridge Volga	1978	Kimry; 56°52′23.8″N 37°21′52.1″E	
9	Vinogradovsky Bridge	155 m (509 ft)	550 m (1,800 ft)	Cable-stayed; Concrete beam deck, concrete pylons	Yenisey	1985	Krasnoyarsk; 56°00′49.8″N 92°54′05.6″E	
10	Krasnoluzhsky Road Bridge	144 m (472 ft)	412 m (1,352 ft)	Box girder 110+144+110; Twin bridges	Third Ring Road (Moscow); 8 lanes Moskva	1998	Moscow; 55°43′40.5″N 37°32′49.4″E	
11	Andreyevsky Road Bridge	135 m (443 ft)	340 m (1,120 ft)	Arch; Steel deck arch Twin bridges	Third Ring Road (Moscow); 8 lanes Moskva	2001	Moscow; 55°42′50.3″N 37°34′37.4″E	
12	Bolsheokhtinsky Bridge	136 m (446 ft)(x2)	334 m (1,096 ft)	Arch; Steel tied arch	4 lanes road bridge Neva	1909	Saint Petersburg; 59°56′33.5″N 30°24′04.1″E	
13	Krasnoluzhsky Railway Bridge	135 m (443 ft)	300 m (980 ft)	Arch; Steel through arch	Railway bridge Moskva	1907; 2001	Moscow; 55°43′41.0″N 37°32′51.4″E	
14	Krymsky Bridge	168 m (551 ft)	262 m (860 ft)	Suspension; Steel deck and pylons Chain bridge 47+168+47	6 lanes road bridge Moskva	1938	Moscow; 55°44′02.2″N 37°35′56.2″E	
15	Kamensk-Uralsky Railway Bridge	140 m (460 ft)	260 m (850 ft)	Arch; Concrete filled steel tubular deck arch	Railway bridge Iset	1939	Kamensk-Uralsky; 56°23′35.3″N 61°57′50.6″E	

== Historical and architectural interest bridges ==
	Name	Russian	Distinction	Length	Type	Carries Crosses	Opened	Location	Oblast	Ref.
1	Verkhoturie Wooden Bridge	Пешеходный подвесной мост через р. Туру	Cultural heritage object No. 6600001107		Suspension; Steel cables, wooden piles and deck	Tura	17th century	Verkhoturye; 58°51′34.3″N 60°48′22.8″E	Sverdlovsk	
2	Figurny Bridge	Фигурный мост	Tsaritsyno Palace; Cultural heritage object No. 7710115014		Masonry; 1 arch	Footbridge	1778	Moscow; 55°36′59.0″N 37°40′50.4″E	Moscow	
3	Big Bridge over the Gully	Большой мост через овраг	Tsaritsyno Palace; Cultural heritage object No. 7710115005	80 m (260 ft)	Masonry; 8 arches	Footbridge	1784	Moscow; 55°37′04.5″N 37°40′50.1″E	Moscow	
4	Lomonosov Bridge	Мост Ломоносова	Cultural heritage object No. 7810706007	63 m (207 ft)	Beam bridge Steel; Vertical-lift bridge	Road bridge Fontanka	1787	Saint Petersburg; 59°55′42.5″N 30°20′08.4″E	Saint Petersburg	
5	Staro-Kalinkin Bridge	Старо-Калинкин мост	Cultural heritage object No. 7810706006	65 m (213 ft)	Masonry; 3 arches	Road bridge Fontanka	1788	Saint Petersburg; 59°54′59.1″N 30°16′45.8″E	Saint Petersburg	
6	Rostokino Aqueduct	Ростокинский акведук	Cultural heritage object No. 7710438000	356 m (1,168 ft)	Masonry; 21 arches Aqueduct	Yauza	1804	Moscow; 55°49′42.3″N 37°39′18.1″E	Moscow	
7	Postoffice Bridge	Почтамтский мост	Cultural heritage object No. 7810699008	35 m (115 ft)	Suspension; Chain bridge	Footbridge; Moyka	1824	Saint Petersburg; 59°55′49.7″N 30°18′02.7″E	Saint Petersburg	
8	Bank Bridge	Банковский мост	Cultural heritage object No. 7810694002	25 m (82 ft)	Suspension; Chain bridge	Footbridge; Griboyedov Canal	1826	Saint Petersburg; 59°55′55.9″N 30°19′29.7″E	Saint Petersburg	
9	Bridge of Four Lions	Львиный мост	Cultural heritage object No. 7810694006	28 m (92 ft)	Suspension; Chain bridge	Footbridge; Griboyedov Canal	1826	Saint Petersburg; 59°55′36.8″N 30°18′04.9″E	Saint Petersburg	
10	Egyptian Bridge (1826) collapsed in 1905	Египетский мост			Suspension	Fontanka	1826	Saint Petersburg; 59°55′00.9″N 30°17′50.5″E	Saint Petersburg	
11	Anichkov Bridge	Аничков мост	Cultural heritage object No. 7810706001	54 m (177 ft)	Masonry; 3 arches	Road bridge Fontanka	1841	Saint Petersburg; 59°55′59.7″N 30°20′36.1″E	Saint Petersburg	
12	Trinity Bridge	Тро́ицкий мост	Cultural heritage object No. 7802128000	582 m (1,909 ft)	Arch; Steel deck arch Bascule bridge	Road bridge Neva	1903	Saint Petersburg; 59°56′55.8″N 30°19′38.3″E	Saint Petersburg	
13	Palace Bridge	Дворцо́вый мост	Cultural heritage object No. 7802129000	260 m (850 ft)	Beam bridge Steel; Bascule bridge	Road bridge Neva	1916	Saint Petersburg; 59°56′28.4″N 30°18′28.8″E	Saint Petersburg	
14	Egyptian Bridge (1955)	Египетский мост	Cultural heritage object No. 7810706002	46 m (151 ft)	Arch; Steel deck arch	Road bridge Fontanka	1955	Saint Petersburg; 59°55′00.9″N 30°17′50.1″E	Saint Petersburg	
15	Queen Louise Bridge	Мост королевы Луизы	Lithuania–Russia border Cultural heritage object No. 3900314000		Beam bridge Steel	Road bridge Neman	1965	Sovetsk – Panemunė; 55°05′02.0″N 21°54′21.8″E	Kaliningrad; Lithuania	

== Notes and references ==
- Notes
- Nicolas Janberg. "International Database for Civil and Structural Engineering". Structurae.com.
- Others references

== See also ==
- List of bridges in Moscow
- List of bridges in Saint Petersburg
- Transport in Russia
- Rail transport in Russia
- Russian federal highways
- Geography of Russia
