= APEC China 2014 =

APEC gathering

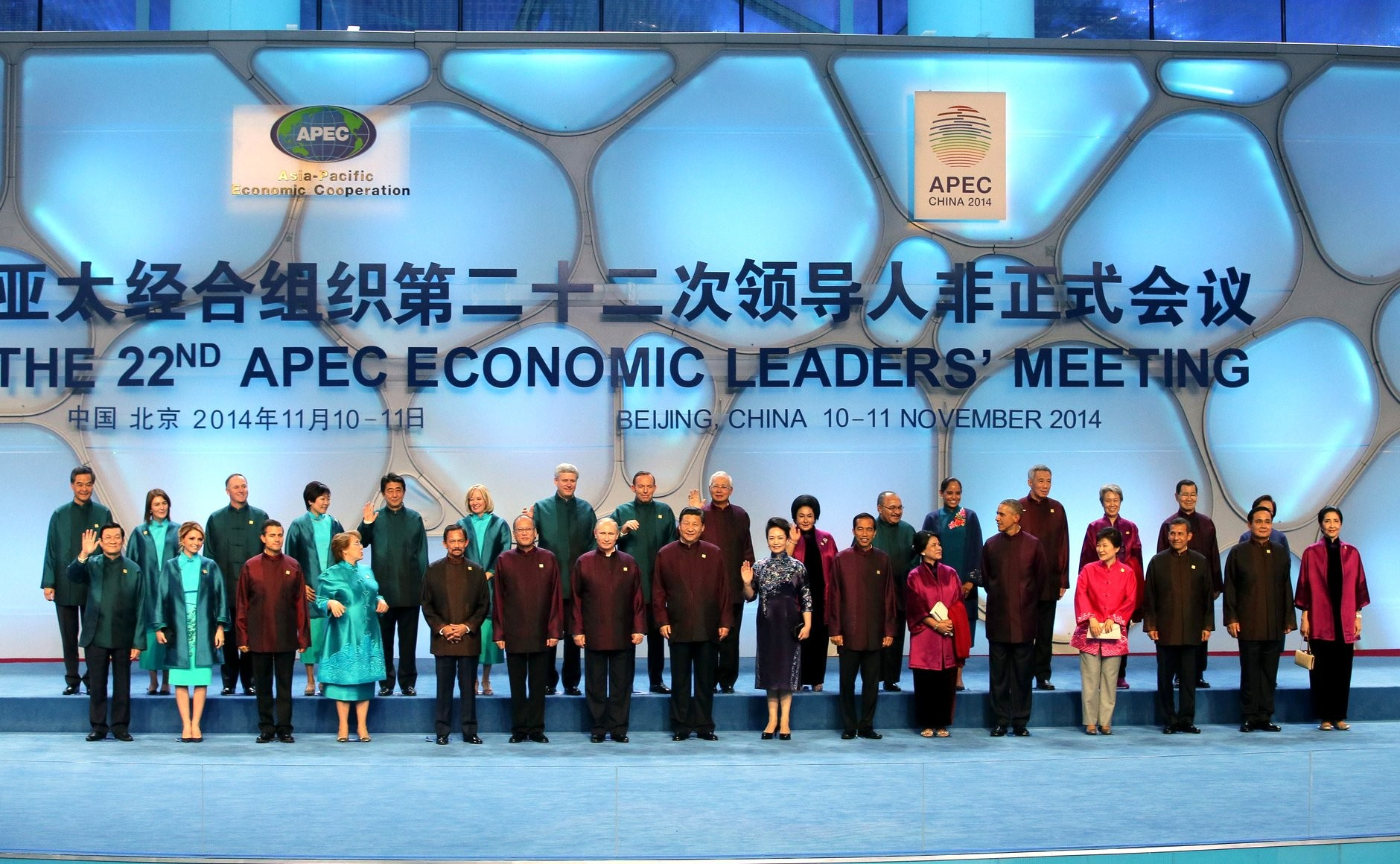
- APEC China 2014 Delegates
- Host country: China
- Date: 10–12 November
- Venues: International Conference Center, Beijing
- Follows: APEC Indonesia 2013
- Precedes: APEC Philippines 2015
- Website: apec-china.org.cn/en/ (archived)

The APEC China 2014 was the 22nd annual gathering of APEC leaders. It was held by Yanqi Lake in the Huairou District of Beijing on 10–12 November 2014.

== Attendees ==
This was the first APEC meeting for Indonesian President Joko Widodo, Thai Prime Minister Prayuth Chan-ocha and Chilean President Michelle Bachelet (in her comeback) since their inaugurations on 20 October 2014, 22 May 2014 and 11 March 2014, respectively.

It was also the last APEC meeting for Australian Prime Minister Tony Abbott (who stepped down on September 15, 2015, following the 2015 Australian leadership spill) and Canadian Prime Minister Stephen Harper (who stepped down on November 4, 2015, following the 2015 Canadian federal election).

Attendees at the 2014 APEC Economic Leaders' Meeting
Member Economy	Position	Name
Australia	Prime Minister	Tony Abbott
Brunei	Sultan	Hassanal Bolkiah
Canada	Prime Minister	Stephen Harper
Chile	President	Michelle Bachelet
China	CCP General Secretary; President (Note: The president of China is legally a ceremonial representative with no real power, but the general secretary of the Chinese Communist Party (de facto leader in one-party communist state) has always held this office since 1993 except for the months of transition.)	Xi Jinping (host)
Hong Kong	Chief Executive	Leung Chun-ying
Indonesia	President	Joko Widodo
Japan	Prime Minister	Shinzō Abe
South Korea	President	Park Geun-hye
Malaysia	Prime Minister	Najib Razak
Mexico	President	Enrique Peña Nieto
New Zealand	Prime Minister	John Key
Papua New Guinea	Prime Minister	Peter O'Neill
Peru	President	Ollanta Humala
Philippines	President	Benigno Aquino III
Russia	President	Vladimir Putin
Singapore	Prime Minister	Lee Hsien Loong
Chinese Taipei	Special Representative	Siew Wan-chang
Thailand	Prime Minister	Prayuth Chan-ocha
United States	President	Barack Obama
Vietnam	President (Note: The actual head of government of Vietnam is the Prime Minister. The President of Vietnam is legally the head of state, but the General Secretary of the Communist Party of Vietnam is the practical highest political leader in one-party communist state.)	Trương Tấn Sang

== Preparations ==
According to journalist John Pomfret, China spent $6 billion on preparations for the summit.

China attempted to prevent Beijing's frequent smog from occurring during the meeting through various measures, including limiting driving and closing down factories in Beijing and the surrounding province of Hebei. The air was clear towards the beginning of the APEC week, but was predicted to be somewhat smoggy during the summit itself. The efforts created somewhat of a backlash among internet users, with the phrase "APEC blue" being coined to satirically refer to something fleeting.

Beijing banned subway riders from wearing Halloween costumes ahead of the event, citing public order concerns.

== Events ==
Chinese leader Xi Jinping and Japanese Prime Minister Shinzo Abe had a highly anticipated face-to-face meeting on November 10. Both leaders were described as looking noticeably dour in the photos of them taken prior to the meeting.

On November 12, Xi and Obama announced that their two nations would work to reduce greenhouse gases. The United States would cut their 2005 carbon emissions by 26% to 28% by 2025, while China would peak their carbon emissions by 2030 and strive to achieve 20% of its energy from sources that do not produce carbon emissions. This agreement marks the first time that China agreed to peak its carbon emissions.

Occupy Central leaders speculated on trying to "crash" the summit to protest Beijing's actions in Hong Kong, but were not allowed to enter mainland China.

== See also ==
- Tangzhuang, the Chinese jacket given to world leaders at the event
- Ninth East Asia Summit in Naypyidaw, Myanmar (held 12–13 November 2014, 13 of the 20 leaders met there again (Note: The leaders/representatives of Australia, Brunei, Indonesia, Japan, Malaysia, New Zealand, Philippines, Russia, Singapore, South Korea, Thailand, United States, and Vietnam met there as members in both organizations.))
- 2014 G20 Brisbane summit in Brisbane, Australia (held 15–16 November 2014, nine of the 20 leaders met there again (Note: Australia, Canada, China, Indonesia, Japan, Mexico, Russia, South Korea and the United States are members in both organizations.))
- APEC United States 2023

== Notes ==
Preceded by APEC Indonesia 2013	APEC meetings 2014	Succeeded by APEC Philippines 2015
