= Zolotoy Bridge =

Zolotoy Bridge Золотой мост
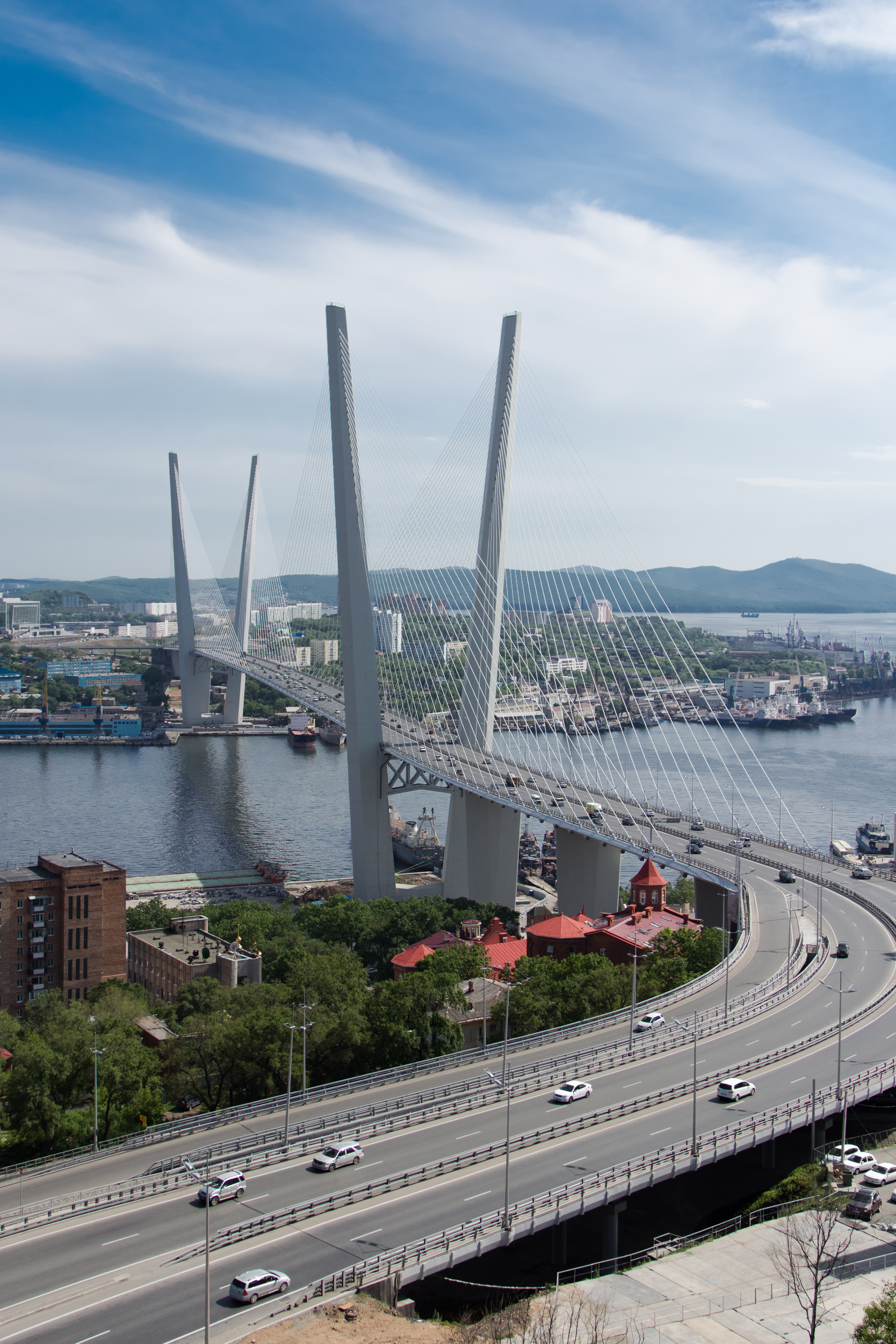
- Coordinates: 43°06′31″N 131°53′46″E
- Carries: 6 lanes
- Crosses: Zolotoy Rog
- Locale: Vladivostok, Russia
- Other name: Golden Horn Bridge

Characteristics
- Design: Cable-stayed bridge
- Total length: 1,387 m (4,551 ft)
- Width: 33.3 m (109 ft)
- Height: 222.42 m (730 ft)
- Longest span: 737 m (2,418 ft)
- Load limit: 35,000 tonnes (34,000 long tons; 39,000 short tons)
- Clearance below: 60 m (197 ft)

History
- Designer: Institute Giprostroymost - Saint Petersburg
- Constructed by: Institute Giprostroymost - Saint Petersburg
- Construction start: July 25th, 2008
- Construction end: August 11th, 2012

Location
- Interactive map of Zolotoy Bridge

The Zolotoy Bridge (Russian: Золотой мост, lit. 'Golden Bridge') is a cable-stayed bridge across the Zolotoy Rog (Golden Horn Bay) in Vladivostok, Russia. The Zolotoy Rog Bridge was one of two bridges, along with the Russky Island Bridge, built in preparation for the 2012 APEC summit. The bridge was commissioned by the city of Vladivostok in 2006. Construction of the bridge began on July 25, 2008, and the bridge was officially opened on August 11, 2012. It is considered the world's 14th longest cable-stayed bridge. This bridge over Golden Horn Bay made it possible to travel from the centre of Vladivostok to the remote Churkin Cape in only 5–10 minutes instead of the usual 1.5–2 hours.

== See also ==
- Golden Bridge (disambiguation)
- Russky Bridge
- List of tallest bridges in the world
- List of largest cable-stayed bridges
