= APEC Russia 2012 =

APEC Annual Summit

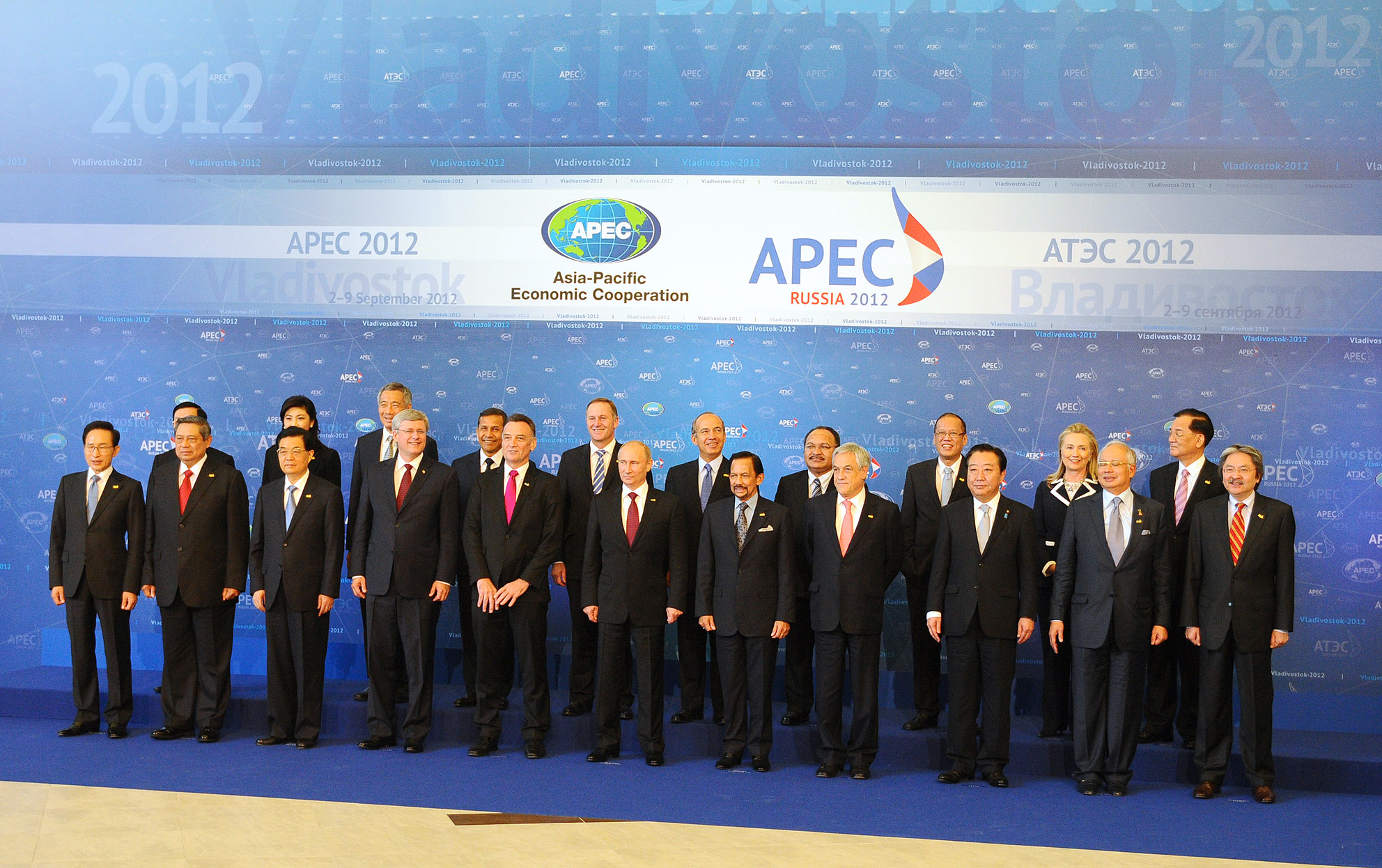
- APEC Russia 2012 Delegates
- Host country: Russia
- Date: 9–10 September
- Venues: Russky Island, Vladivostok
- Follows: APEC United States 2011
- Precedes: APEC Indonesia 2013
- Website: apec2012.ru (archived)

The APEC Russia 2012 (Russian: Саммит АТЭС Владивосток-2012, romanized: Sammit ATES Vladivostok-2012) was the 24th annual gathering of APEC leaders. Leaders from the member economies met on Russky Island, off the coast of Vladivostok, Russia on September 9–10, 2012.

The summit on Russky Island saw the resort, catering and entertainment facilities, in addition to the renovation and upgrading of Vladivostok International Airport.

Two giant cable-stayed bridges were built in preparation for the summit, namely the Zolotoy Rog bridge over the Zolotoy Rog bay in the downtown, and Russky Island Bridge from mainland to Russky Island (which is the longest cable-stayed bridge in the world right now). The new campus of the Far Eastern Federal University was also completed on the island by 2012 to house the summit.

Russky Island, the place where the summit took place

== Preparation ==
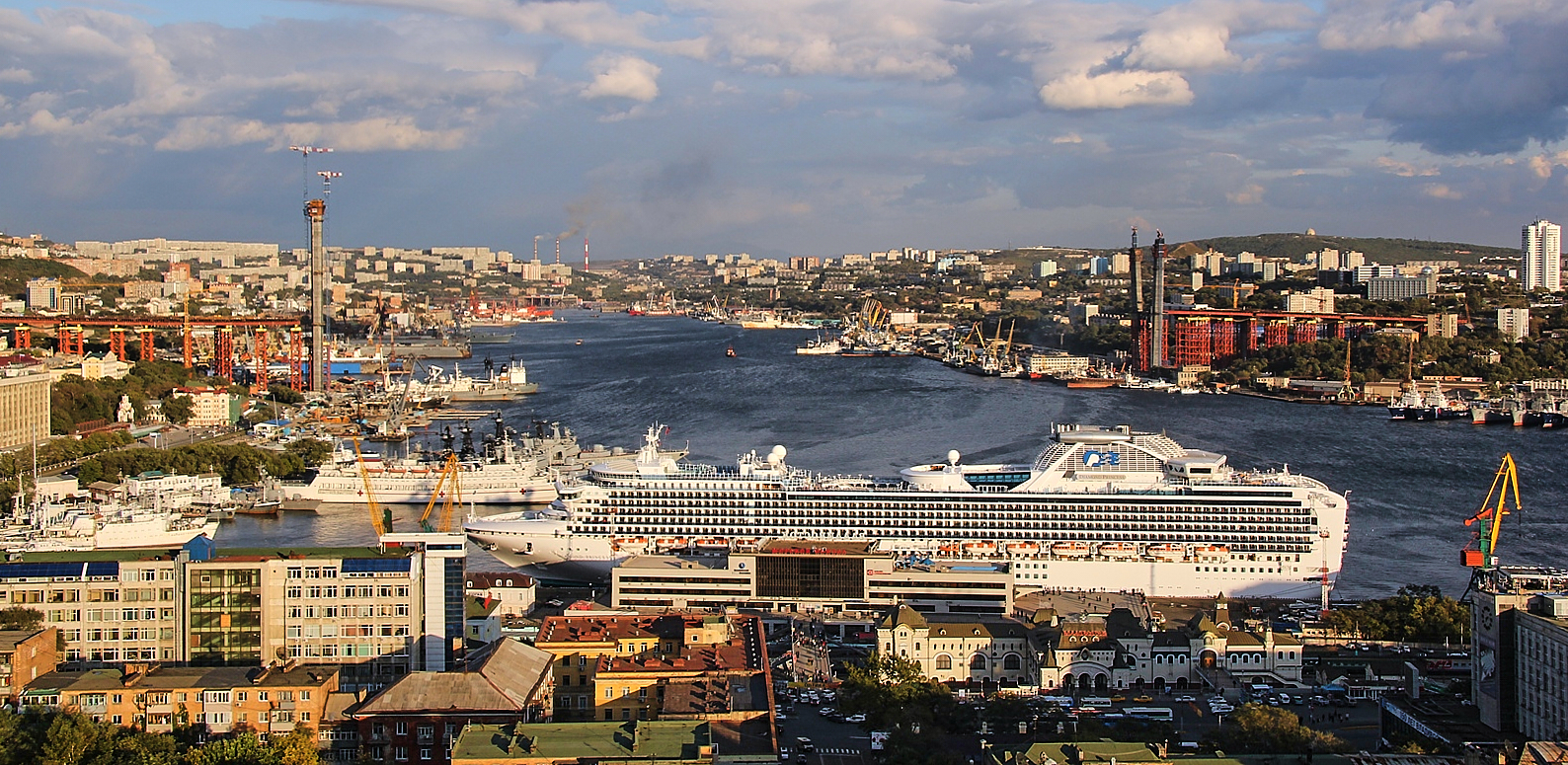
Zolotoy Rog Bay in central Vladivostok, with the bridge construction seen

At APEC Vietnam 2006 in Hanoi, Russia put forward a proposal to host the 2012 summit. Originally, Patrokl Bay (southern part of Vladivostok) was suggested as the site to hold the summit. The original plan was to build a palace to host the actual summit, and a number of five-star hotels for visitors. After the summit, the palace would be converted into a wedding palace, its conference centre into the Opera, and the hotels into residential buildings. The original estimate for development costs was in the excess of 382 billion rubles, and included money the city felt was necessary to bring infrastructure such as the sewage system, roads, bridges, and water pipes to up-to-date condition. Herman Gref, then-Minister of Economics and Trade, who visited Vladivostok in December 2006 to ascertain the city's readiness to hold the summit, promptly dismissed this plan, stating that the cost estimate was overblown and that he was not responsible for solving the city's problems, and further accused the Vladivostok administration of unprofessionalism.

In January 2007, Vladimir Putin, then-President of Russia, stated that holding a summit in Vladivostok was a distinct possibility, and that at least 100 billion rubles would be required to prepare the city for the summit, which, at the time, was three-times more than the budget of Primorsky Krai as a whole. On 27 January 2007, Putin visited Vladivostok to participate in a meeting regarding Russia's upcoming rotational presidency of APEC.

The proposal put forward for Russia to hold the 2012 summit on Russky Island, which was a closed military zone during the Soviet-era, was confirmed at the end of the APEC Australia 2007 summit in Sydney, Australia. At a press conference in Sydney, Sergey Darkin, the Governor of Primorsky Krai, estimated the cost of hosting the summit at 147.5 billion rubles, 50% more than previous estimates. The construction of infrastructure serving the summit, by Darkin experts' estimates, would aid the economic development of the Russian Far East and would see more than a sixfold increase of the Gross Regional Product of Primorsky Krai by 2020.

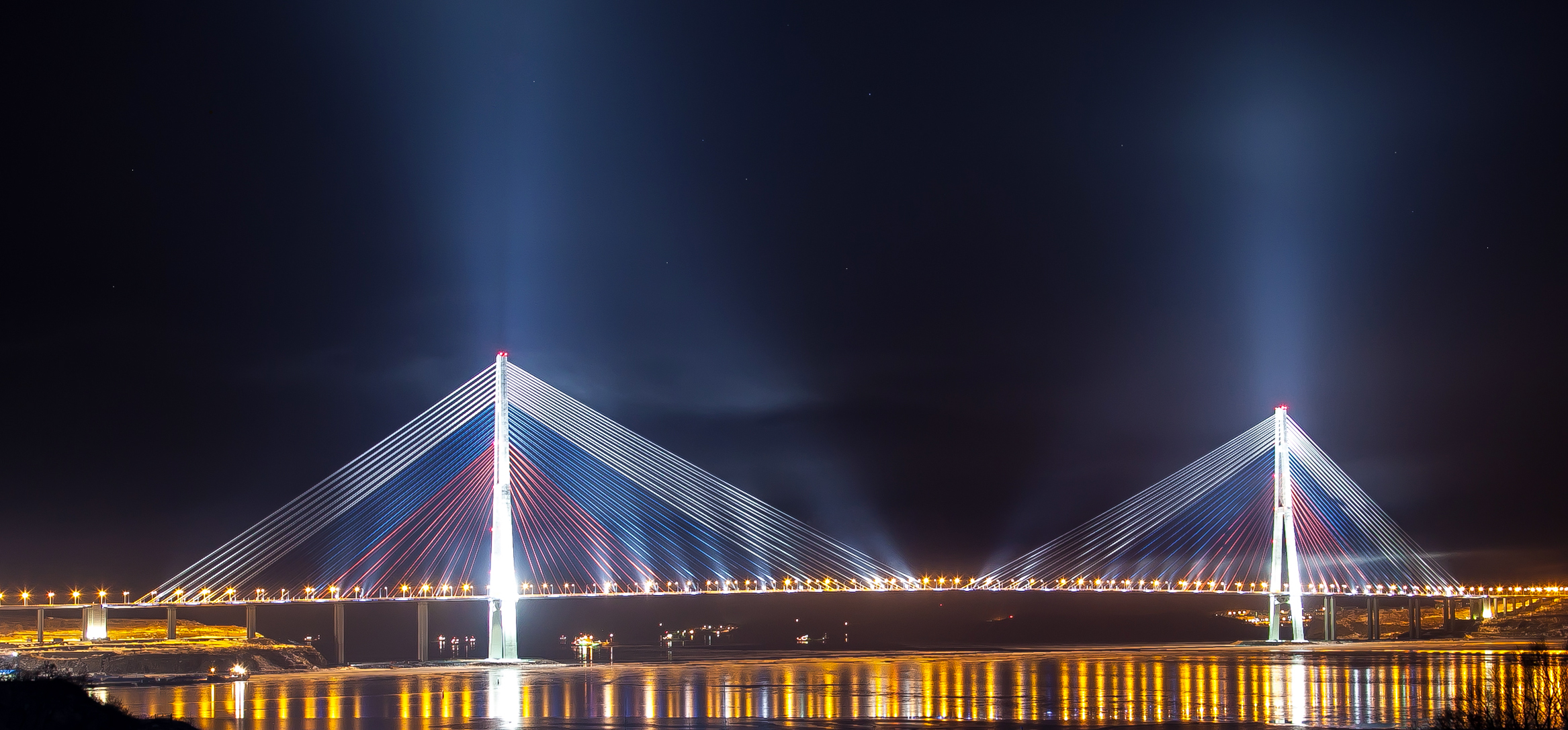
Russki Island Bridge

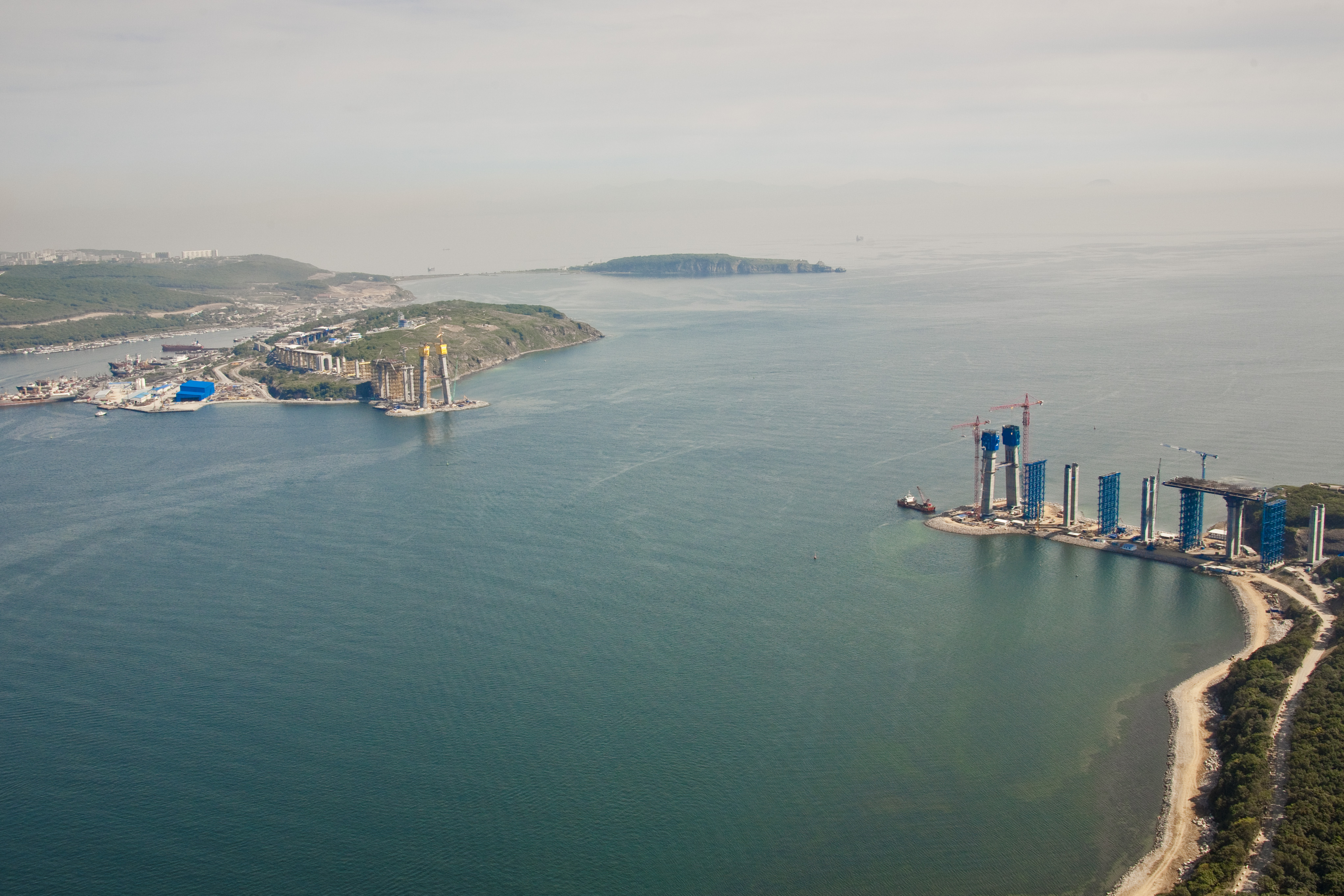
Pylons sites of Russki Island Bridge

In February 2008, Governor Darkin announced that the general plan of the city development would incorporate summit preparation activities, and that hosting the summit was not a goal in itself, but rather a tool to strengthen Russia's positions in the Asia-Pacific region. The construction projects were to include the building of bridges across Zolotoy Rog Bay and to Russky Island, new roads, modern hotels, a Theater of Opera and Ballet, as well as overall improvements to the city's infrastructure. Later in April, the governor also stated that the buildings serving the summit would later be efficiently re-purposed. In particular, it was suggested to use the conference centre as a new library, while the hotels would remain to facilitate tourism to the island. Vladivostok International Airport was also to be modernised. By the end of April, Primorsky Krai received the first amount of 437 million rubles from the federal budget to commence summit preparations.

On 18 December 2007, the results of the contest to create the summit logo were announced. The logo was to conform to three main criteria: it was to be patriotic, to portray the summit as the main cultural and economic event in Primorsky Krai in 2012, and to use the historical and cultural symbols of Primorsky Krai and Vladivostok. The winning emblem was created by Yevgeny Pogrebnyak, a professional designer and a resident of Vladivostok, who was awarded 65,000 rubles in prize money.

On 8 April 2008, Sergey Stepashin, head of the Account Chamber of Russia, visited Vladivostok with the purpose of auditing summit preparation activities. The audit showed that only six out of 36 summit-related construction projects were properly documented. Stepashin also stated that one of the main priorities was the de-criminalisation of the region, as its criminal image may impede the in-flow of investments, and announced that the development of the Russian Far East region is one of the national priorities of Russia.

In May 2008, the state expert commission approved the project of building a 3,150-metre (10,330 ft) suspension bridge from Vladivostok to Russky Island.

In June 2008, Sergey Stepashin re-iterated the findings of the April audit, explicitly stating that Russia was not yet ready to host the summit. He also stated that in order to rectify the situation, an additional three billion rubles would be necessary to fund the summit preparation activities. Later in June, Dmitry Kozak, then Minister of Regional Development of Russia, also visited Vladivostok to ascertain the progress. He visited Vladivostok International Airport and Russky Island and concluded that meeting all the deadlines is "entirely possible".

On 30 June 2008, the Administration of Primorsky Krai contracted Pacific Ocean Bridge Company to build a bridge across Zolotoy Rog Bay, a project worth 17.9 billion rubles. On 9 July 2008, Viktor Grebnev, the Executive Director of the company, commented that construction of the other bridge—to Russky Island—would be impossible to accomplish on schedule for "technological reasons"; however, Vasiliy Avchenko in Expert argues that the Russian government will build the bridge at any cost, but on time, in order to demonstrate the island's possibilities. The construction of the Zolotoy Rog bridge commenced on 25 July 2008. On 30 July, plans to build the Theatre of Opera and Ballet on a floating island were announced by the Administration of Primorsky Krai. The theatre was to seat up to 2,000 people, and the floating island was scheduled for construction on 1 February 2009. 18.8 million rubles were included in the krai budget for the construction of the theatre. Also announced were the plans to build a medical centre in the Vtoraya Rechka residential area. The medical centre would serve the needs of the summit in 2012 and will be converted into a krai hospital after the summit is concluded.

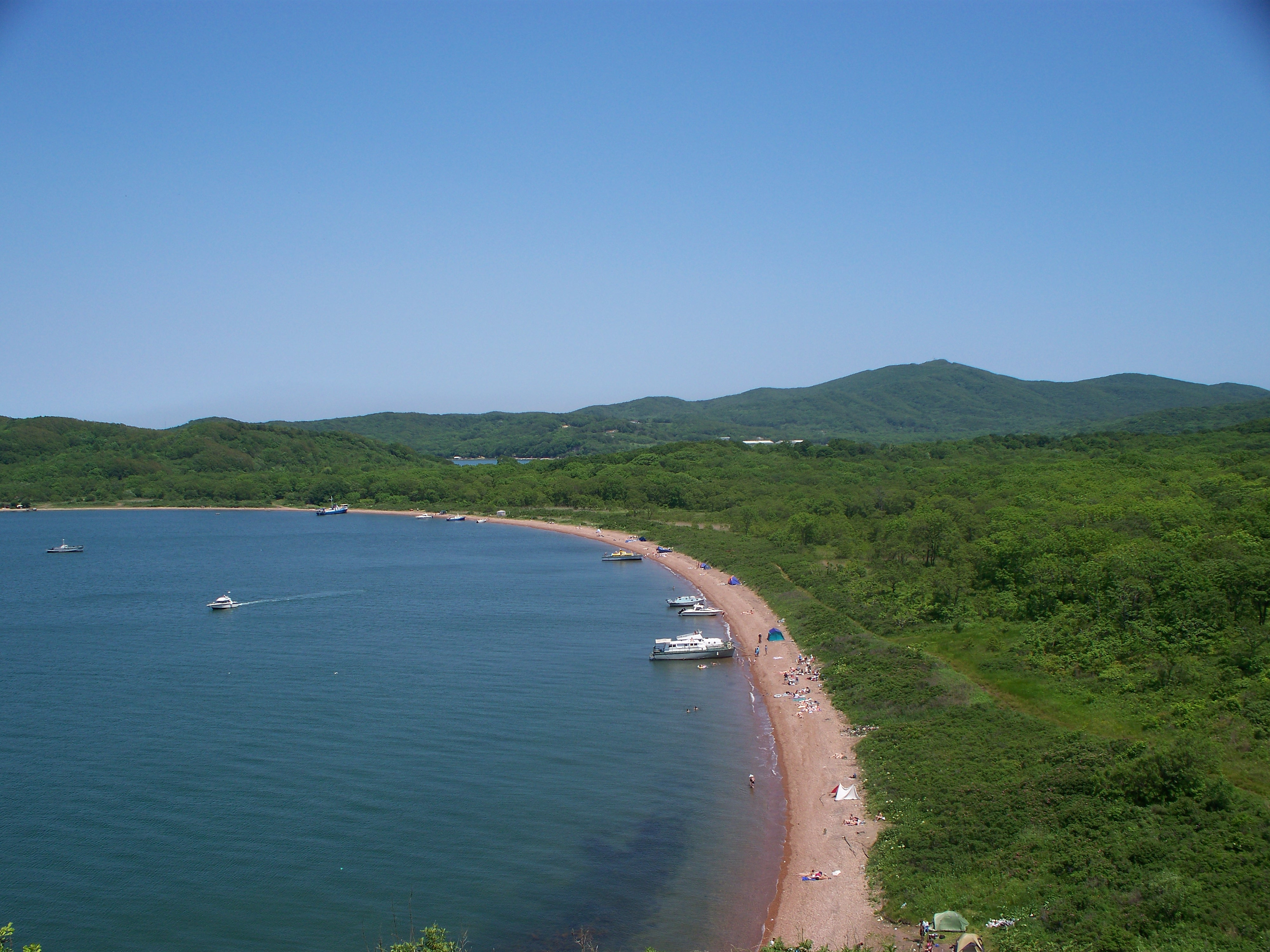
A view of the beach at Philippovsky Bay, Russky Island (2008).

In August 2008, Nikolay Bulayev, head of the Federal Education Agency, visited Vladivostok to visit the site of the future Far Eastern Federal University, the campus of which will be located on the Russky Island. The campus buildings would include an aquarium, a nature park, a residential area for the students and university personnel. Some of the buildings serving the 2012 summit would also be transferred to the university upon the summit's conclusion. In September 2008, Prime Minister Putin announced that Russian military installations on the island would be removed and the building of the campus of the Far Eastern Federal University would proceed. On 31 August 2008, President Dmitry Medvedev signed Ukaz №1277 authorising the building of the bridge across the Eastern Bosphorus to Russky Island, and appointed a contractor for the construction of the bridge which is expected to cost approximately US$1 billion.

In November 2008, Viktor Basargin, the Minister of Regional Development of Russia, visited Vladivostok International Airport and assessed the progress of construction of the bridges and the buildings on the Russky Island. Overall, the Minister was satisfied with the overall progress and the pace of the construction. Basargin announced that everything would be ready on schedule. Due to the 2008 financial crisis and the Great Recession in Russia, funding of development for the conference, which stands at 351 billion rubles, may be reduced by 25 billion rubles, due to reduction in the price of construction materials and streamlining of works.

Despite these reductions, the Ministry of Finance of Russia announced in March 2009 that due to the crisis the federal budget was unlikely to have the previously committed 202 billion rubles fully available to finance the summit preparation projects. One of the proposed resolutions was to move the summit to Saint Petersburg, as that city's infrastructure is better developed to host the summit and would be less costly. Originally, First Deputy Prime Minister in Vladimir Putin's Second Cabinet Igor Shuvalov did not confirm that such plans exist, although he noted that the scenario is possible. Later in March, however, Shuvalov held a meeting in Moscow dealing with the issues of the summit planning, at which time it was confirmed that the summit would take place in Vladivostok and not elsewhere. During the meeting, the plans for building the theater of opera and ballet and the medical center were moved to an unspecified later date, but the rest of the construction is supposed to continue on schedule.

== Pre-summit tensions ==
Taiwan's decision to hold live fire drills on 31 August on Taiping Island, ahead of Vietnam's injections were said to have increased tensions in the South China Sea disputes prior to the summit. Disputes also involve Japan and the Philippines against China, which Taiwan supports.

== Youth forum & the Voices of the Future program ==
The APEC Youth Festival opened in Vladivostok in the days preceding the APEC Leader's meeting. The forum took place on the campus of the Far Eastern Federal University on September 2 to 4 in parallel with APEC-2012 Leaders' Week in Vladivostok. Delegates representing the APEC economies included undergraduate and postgraduate students, young scientists, entrepreneurs and politicians, who proposed their own solutions to urgent social and economic problems facing the Asia-Pacific region. At the end of the forum the delegates presented their own declaration which was presented to the APEC Leader's Meeting participants. Selected participants were then invited to join the Voices of the Future delegation and attend the APEC CEO Summit on Russky Island.

== See also ==
- Pacific Rim
- National costume
- East Asia Economic Caucus
- East Asia Summit
- Asia-Europe Meeting
- ASEAN Free Trade Area

Preceded by APEC United States 2011	APEC meetings 2012	Succeeded by APEC Indonesia 2013
