= APEC Indonesia 2013 =

APEC gathering

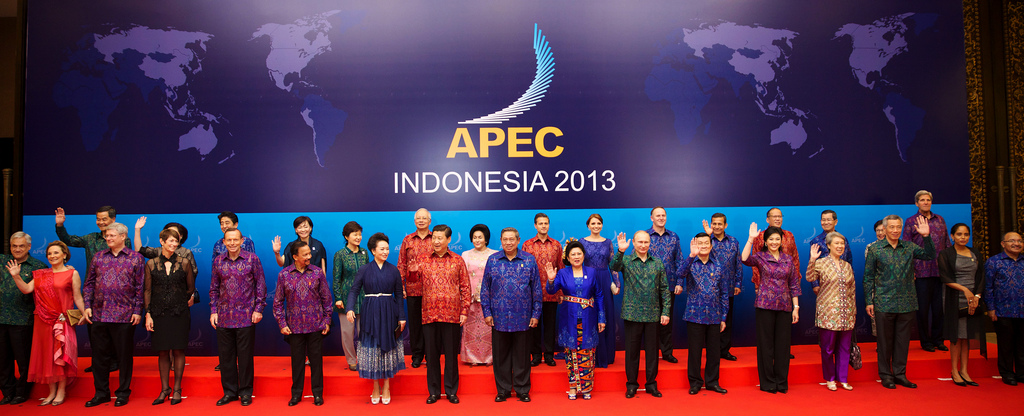
- APEC Indonesia 2013 delegates attired in Endek
- Host country: Indonesia
- Dates: 5–7 October
- Motto: Resilient Asia-Pacific, Engine of Global Growth
- Venues: Bali Nusa Dua Convention Center, Bali
- Follows: APEC Russia 2012
- Precedes: APEC China 2014
- Website: apec2013.or.id (archived)

The APEC Indonesia 2013 was the 25th annual gathering of APEC leaders. It was held in Bali on 5–7 October 2013. The summit also saw the revival of wearing national dress, which had been explicitly discontinued by US President Barack Obama two years prior.

== Attendees ==
This was the first APEC meeting for Australian Prime Minister Tony Abbott, Chinese leader Xi Jinping, Japanese Prime Minister Shinzō Abe (in his comeback), South Korean President Park Geun-hye and Mexican President Enrique Peña Nieto since their inaugurations on 18 September 2013, 15 March 2013, 26 December 2012, 25 February 2013 and 1 December 2012, respectively.

It was the last APEC meeting for Chilean President Sebastian Piñera (during his first term, as he stepped down on March 11, 2014 following the 2013 Chilean election), as well Thai Prime Minister Yingluck Shinawatra (who was ousted on May 7, 2014 following the 2013–14 political crisis in Thailand) and the host, Indonesian President Susilo Bambang Yudhoyono (who stepped down on October 20, 2014 following the 2014 Indonesian presidential election).

United States President Barack Obama canceled his trip due to the United States federal government shutdown of 2013, sending Secretary of State John Kerry in his place.

Attendees at the 2013 APEC Economic Leaders' Meeting
Country	Position	Name
Australia	Prime Minister	Tony Abbott
Brunei	Sultan	Hassanal Bolkiah
Canada	Prime Minister	Stephen Harper
Chile	President	Sebastián Piñera
China	President (Note: The president of China is legally a ceremonial representative with no real power, but the general secretary of the Chinese Communist Party (de facto leader in one-party communist state) has always held this office since 1993 except for the months of transition.)	Xi Jinping
Hong Kong	Chief Executive	Leung Chun-ying
Indonesia	President	Susilo Bambang Yudhoyono (host)
Japan	Prime Minister	Shinzō Abe
South Korea	President	Park Geun-hye
Malaysia	Prime Minister	Najib Razak
Mexico	President	Enrique Peña Nieto
New Zealand	Prime Minister	John Key
Papua New Guinea	Prime Minister	Peter O'Neill
Peru	President	Ollanta Humala
Philippines	President	Benigno Aquino III
Russia	President	Vladimir Putin
Singapore	Prime Minister	Lee Hsien Loong
Chinese Taipei	Special Representative	Siew Wan-chang
Thailand	Prime Minister	Yingluck Shinawatra
United States*	Secretary of State	John Kerry
Vietnam	President (Note: The actual head of government of Vietnam is the Prime Minister. The President of Vietnam is legally the head of state, but the General Secretary of the Communist Party of Vietnam is the practical highest political leader in one-party communist state.)	Trương Tấn Sang
(*) U.S. President Barack Obama did not attend the leaders summit. Representative was sent and attended on his behalf.

== Summit Results ==
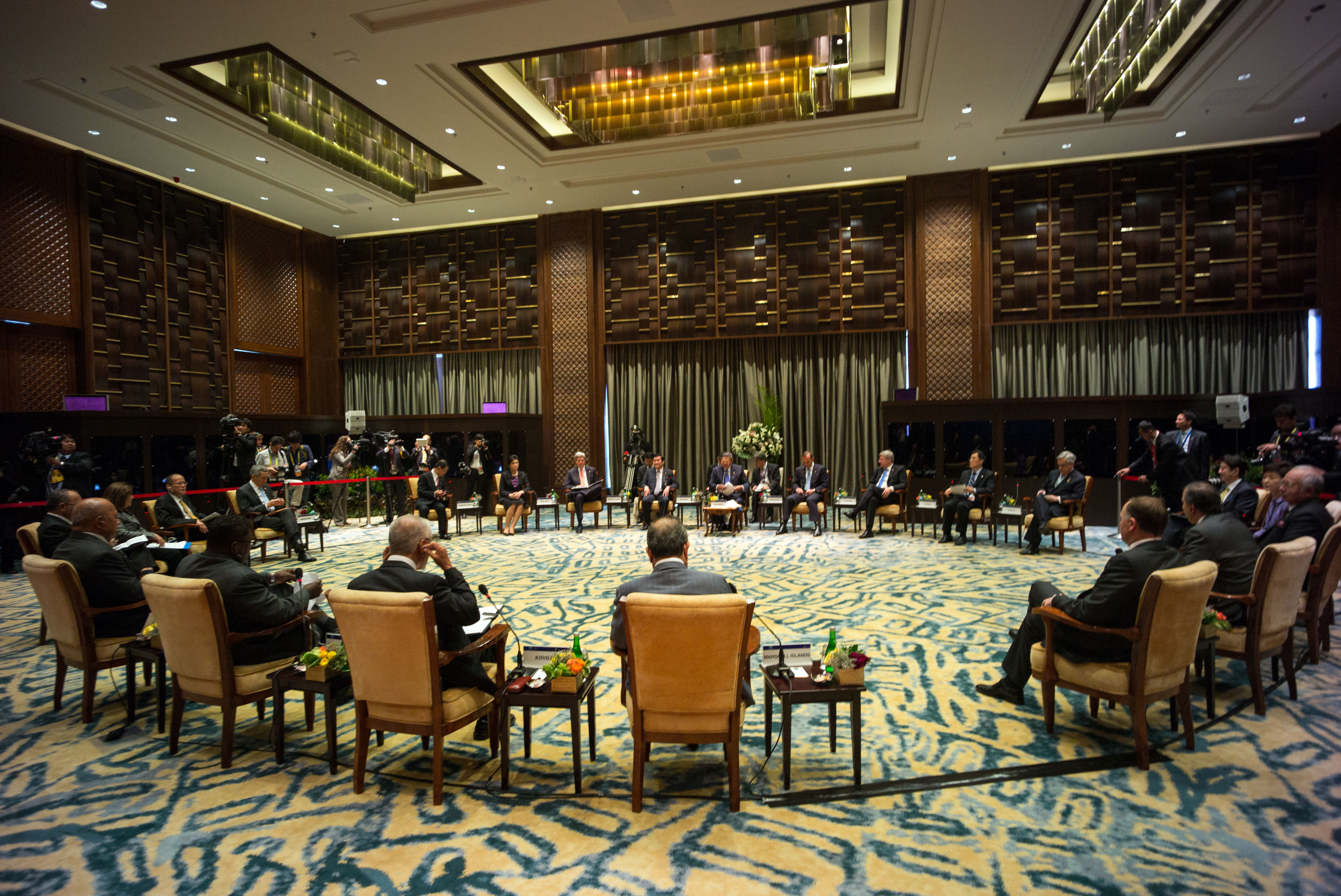
APEC Economic Leaders Meeting 2013

The APEC meeting reached its peak on October 8, 2014. President Susilo Bambang Yudhoyono conveyed seven points agreed upon at the summit of 21 APEC member leaders, including:

- The leaders of member countries agreed to redouble efforts to achieve the Bogor Goals by 2020. The leaders shared the view that all APEC economies should benefit from APEC cooperation.
- APEC agreed to increase intra-APEC or intra-regional trade through trade facilitation, capacity building, and the functioning of the multilateral trading system.
- APEC members agreed to accelerate physical, institutional, and people-to-people connectivity development. In this regard, strategic landscapes and connectivity will create more jobs and ensure job security.
- APEC members reaffirmed their commitment to achieving balanced power, in terms of global growth, sustainability, and inclusiveness. In this process, APEC members agreed to facilitate the participation of Micro, Small, and Medium Enterprises (MSMEs) and women entrepreneurs.
- APEC members agreed to cooperate to improve regional food, energy, and water resources. These efforts are aimed at addressing the challenges of population growth and the negative impacts of climate change.
- APEC members agreed to ensure APEC synergy and complementarity in other multilateral and regional cooperation, such as the East Asia Summit and the G20.
- APEC members agreed to work closely with the business sector through the APEC Business Advisory Council (ABAC) to achieve the goals of free and open trade and investment.

== Notes ==
Preceded by APEC Russia 2012	APEC meetings 2013	Succeeded by APEC China 2014
