= Temernitsky Bridge =

Temernitsky Bridge Темерницкий мост
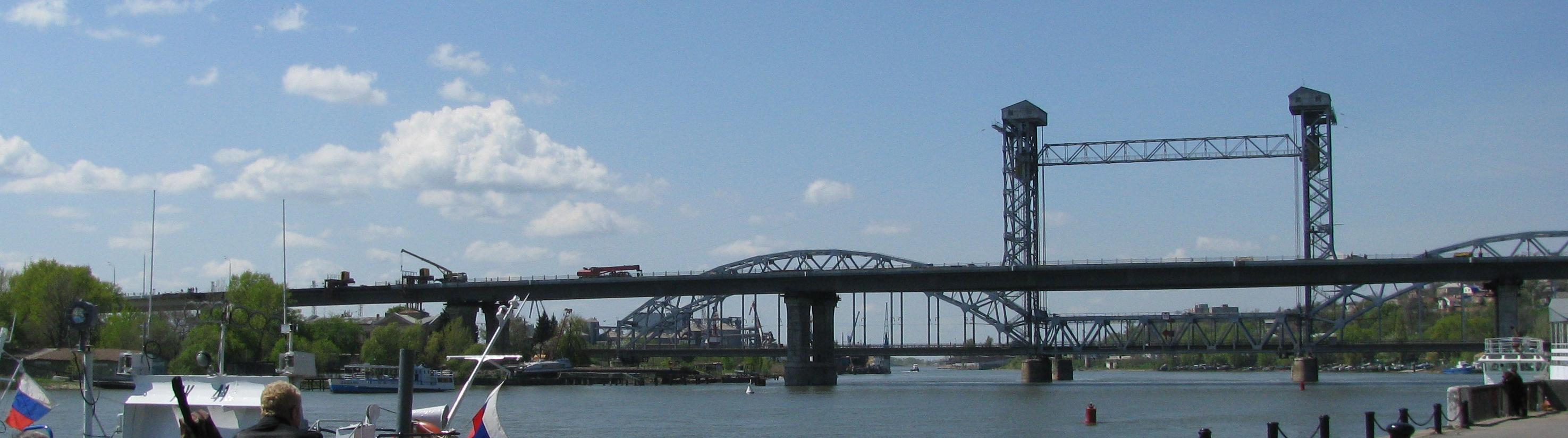
- Coordinates: 47°12′36″N 39°42′10″E
- Crosses: Don
- Locale: Rostov-on-Don

Characteristics
- Total length: 2255 m
- Width: 28 m
- Height: 21 m

History
- Opened: 16 December 2010
- Inaugurated: 25 December 2010

Location
- Interactive map of Temernitsky Bridge

Temernitsky Bridge (Russian: Темерницкий мост, romanized: Temernitsky most) is a bridge in Rostov-on-Don over the river Don. It was built in 2007–2010 on the project of engineer Aleksandr Efremushkin. In 2011 the bridge was named Temernitsky after Temernik River, as the bridge's overpass extends along with this river.

== Description and history ==
Temernitsky Bridge (which has designed capacity of about 60 thousand cars per day) provides an alternative to Voroshilovsky bridge (about 46 thousand cars per day) entry to the M4 "Don" highway from Rostov-on-Don towards Krasnodar and Stavropol. It also has great transport significance for cities Bataysk and Azov.

The bridge was being built at an accelerated pace, in connection with the emergency condition of Voroshilovsky Bridge, which since June 2008 was opened only for limited traffic. In 2014, because of the probability of collapse of Voroshilovsky Bridge, Rostov-on-Don City Administration decided to block the traffic on this bridge and move it to Temernitsky Bridge.

Since 2014 Temernitsky Bridge runs the route of public buses between Bataisk and Rostov-on-Don. A new scheme of bus traffic was appointed in connection with the closure of the Voroshilovsky Bridge.

In the winter of 2016, a set of measures was taken to clean Temernitsky Bridge, which allowed to minimize the cost of adapting the structure to the spring period.

In 2017 the bridge was repaired.
