= Kostroma Bridge =

Kostroma Bridge Костромской мост
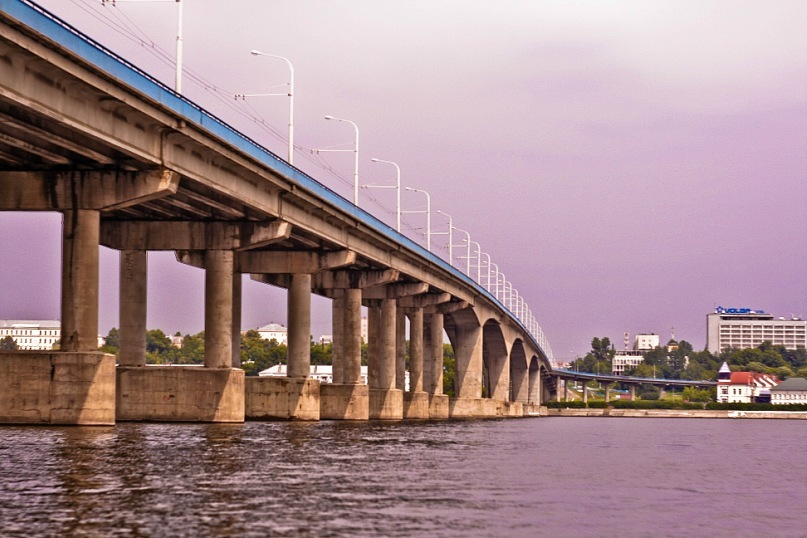
- View of the bridge in 2012 from the water of the Southwestern side
- Coordinates: 57.75269°N 40.93887°E
- Locale: Kostroma, Kostroma Oblast, Russia

Characteristics
- Design: Arch bridge
- Total length: 1,236 m (4,055 ft)
- Width: 18 m (59 ft)
- Longest span: 148 m (486 ft)

History
- Opened: September 12, 1970

Location
- Interactive map of Kostroma Bridge

The Kostroma Bridge (Russian: Костромско́й автодоро́жный мост) is the only road bridge crossing the Volga river on the section between Yaroslavl and Kineshma (until 2003, Nizhny Novgorod). The bridge is located in the central part of Kostroma, near Podlipaeva Street and Magistralnaya Street.

== History ==
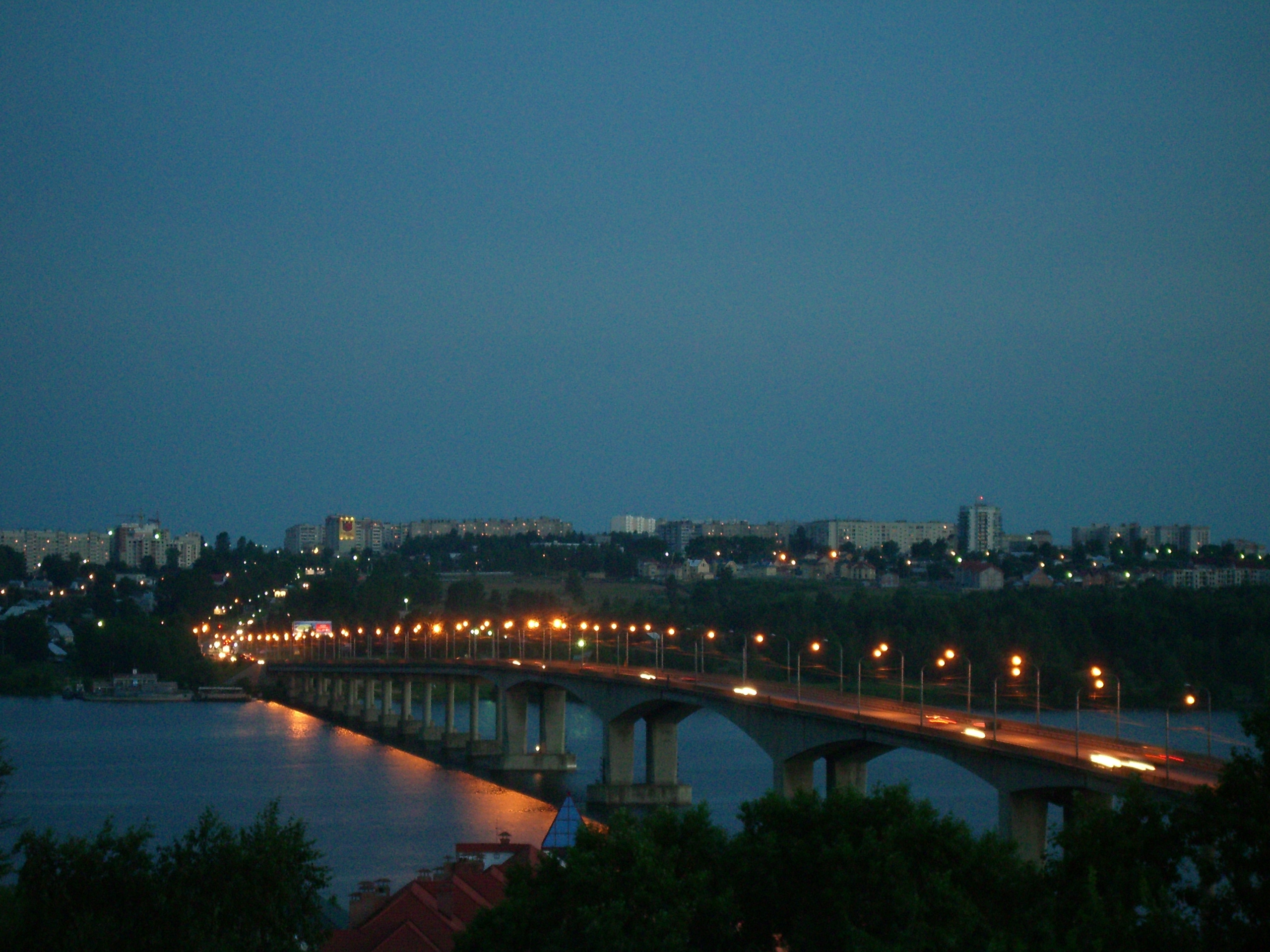
Bridge in the evening

The bridge was opened on 12 September 1970.

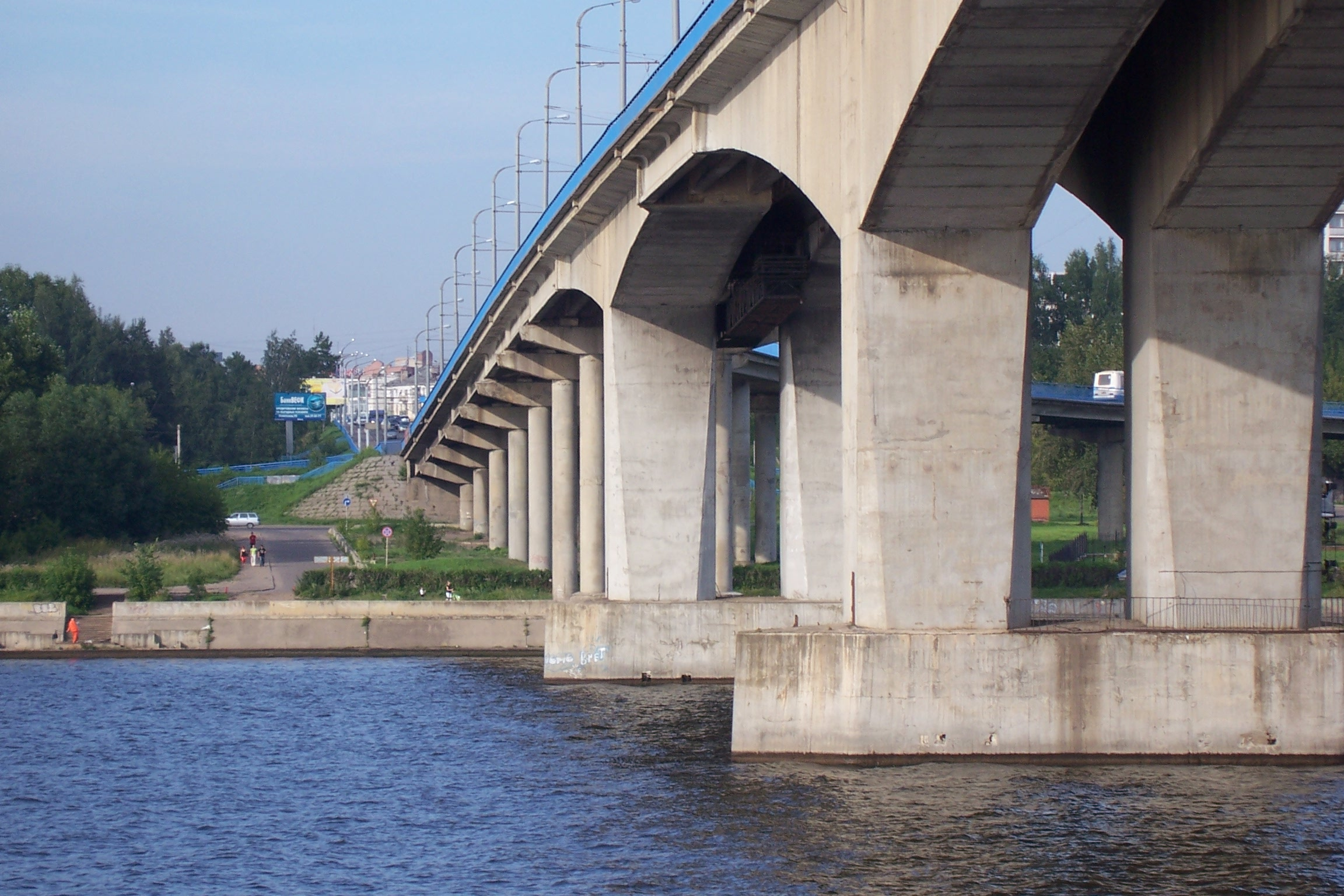
Bridge in 2008

On February 20, 2012, the first stone was laid for the construction of a new four-lane automobile and pedestrian bridge across the Volga river near the village Serednya.
