= Voroshilovsky bridge =

Voroshilovsky bridge Ворошиловский мост
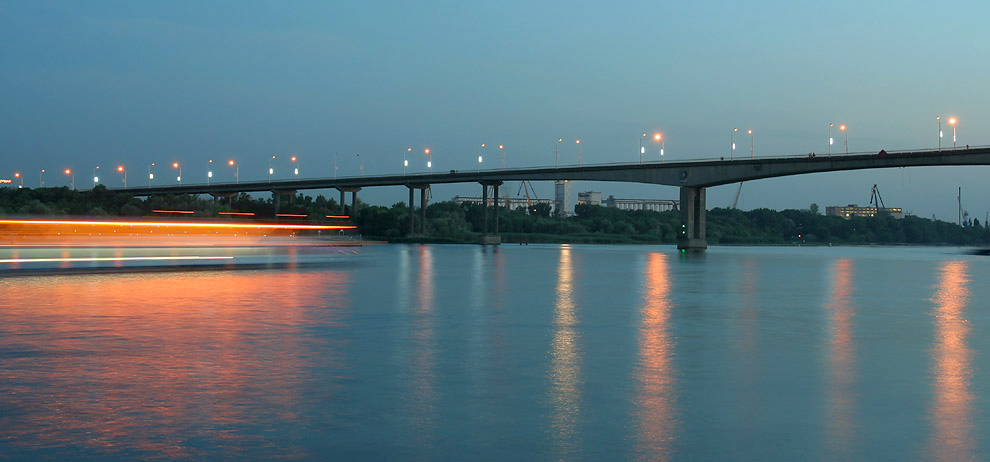
- Coordinates: 47°12′51″N 39°43′20″E
- Crosses: Don
- Locale: Rostov-on-Don

Characteristics
- Total length: 450 m
- Width: 12 m
- Height: 32 m

History
- Opened: 9 October 1965
- Inaugurated: 15 February 2014

Voroshilovsky bridge (Russian: Вороши́ловский мо́ст, romanized: Voroshylovskiy most) is a bridge in Rostov-on-Don over the river Don. It was built in 1961–1965 by project engineer N. I. Kuznetsov and architect S. A. Kleiman. The bridge connects Rostov with other city-satellites, including Bataisk and Azov. The bridge got its name due to being a continuation of the avenue of the same name.

== History ==
Vorshilovsky bridge had been being built since 1961 to 1965 year. Engineer N. I. Kuznetsov and architect Sh. A. Kleiman were projecting it. Voroshilovsky bridge's foundation has finished the plan of post-war reconstruction that has started in 1947.

The bridge in the Budionosky avenue's alignment was the main ferry to the left bank on the Don river. The idea of foundation the obelisk, indicating the border of Europe and Asia, on the bridge was discussed at the construction stage, because, according to one version, the border between two parts of the world passed along the Don. But the project was not realised.

== Description ==
Voroshilovsky bridge is an architectural element of Rostov-on-Don.

== Bridge state ==
On 22 October 2007, during the planned inspection of Voroshilovsky bridge, a crack was found, so that the bridge was closed to all modes of transport, and then to pedestrians for an indefinite time. This increased the load on the other two bridges and further aggravated the traffic situation in the city.

Since 27 December 2007, regular traffic of city and "batay" buses has been resumed, provided that there is no more than one bus on the bridge and movement only along the Eastern roadway of the bridge. On 23 June 2008, traffic was opened on Voroshilov bridge (except trucks). On 25 July 2008, traffic was blocked along Sivers street in the area of Bakery No. 1 for the construction of a new bridge across the Don river.

== Bridge reconstruction ==
Until the end of 2017, the authorities of Rostov-on-don intend to reconstruct the Voroshilov bridge, expanding it from two available lanes to six.

Construction and installation work began in the autumn of 2013, the completion of works was planned by 30 November 2017; the total cost of the work is estimated at 6.03 billion rubles.

Since 15 February 2014, traffic on the old Voroshilovsky bridge was closed, and the bridge was completely dismantled. The decision to close the bridge was made on the basis of the conclusion of the Institute "Protectstructure". The survey revealed an increase in inelastic deformations of the superstructures, and the total deflection was 63 centimeters.
