= Murom Bridge =

Murom Bridge Муромский мост
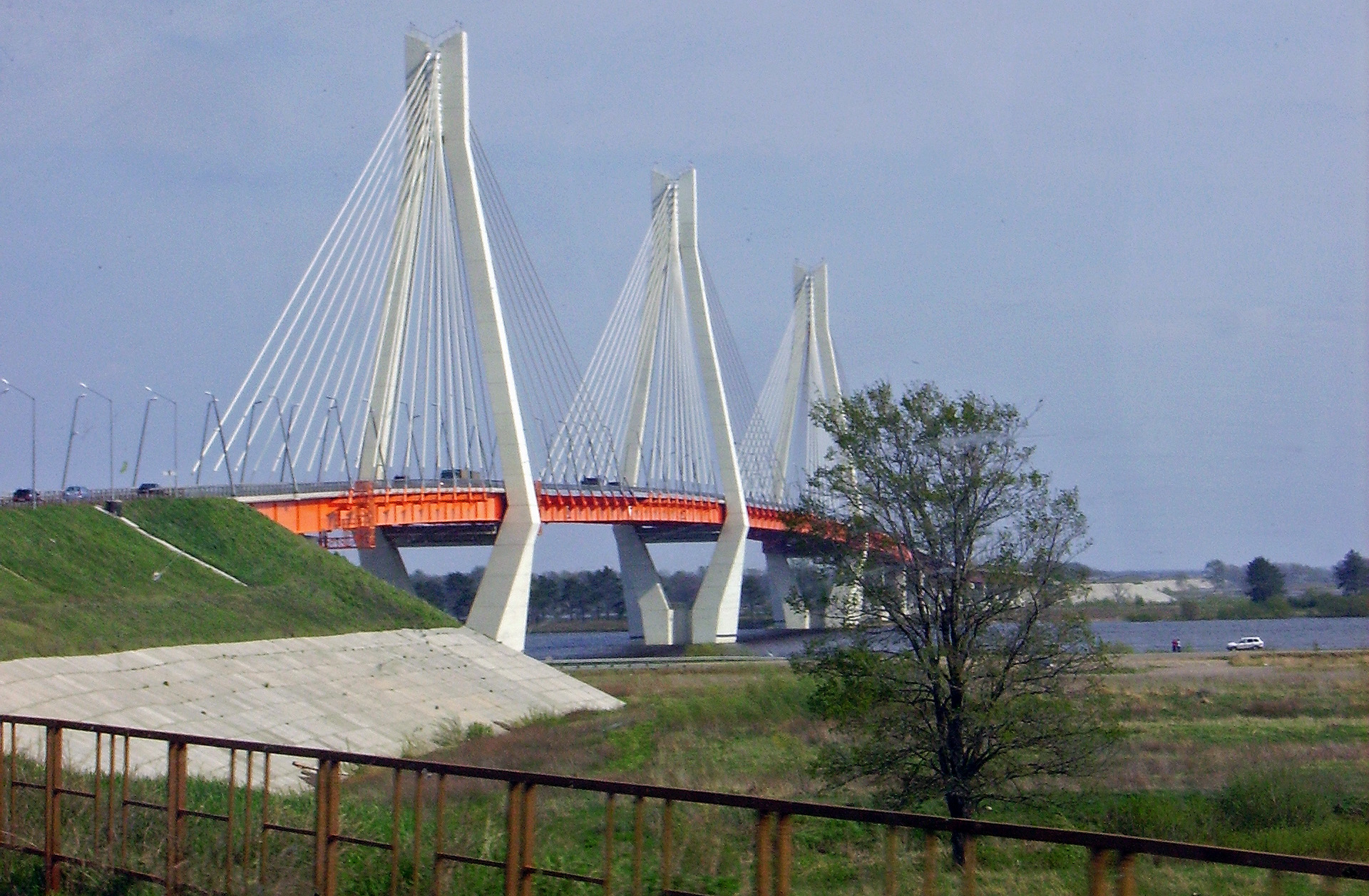
- Coordinates: 55.616376°N 42.071246°E
- Crosses: Oka
- Locale: Murom, Vladimir Oblast; Navashino, Nizhny Novgorod Oblast, Russia

Characteristics
- Design: Cable-stayed bridge

Location
- Interactive map of Murom Bridge

The Murom Bridge (Russian: Му́ромский мост) is a metal road cable-stayed bridge crossing the Oka river in Murom, Vladimir Oblast and Navashino, Nizhny Novgorod Oblast, in Russia.

The bridge was commissioned on October 1, 2009 by Russian construction company Mostotrest. Then-Russian Prime Minister Vladimir Putin attended the opening of the bridge.

On August 1, 2013, the Murom bridge was named the "most beautiful bridge" in Russia.
