= APEC blue =

Chinese environmental policies

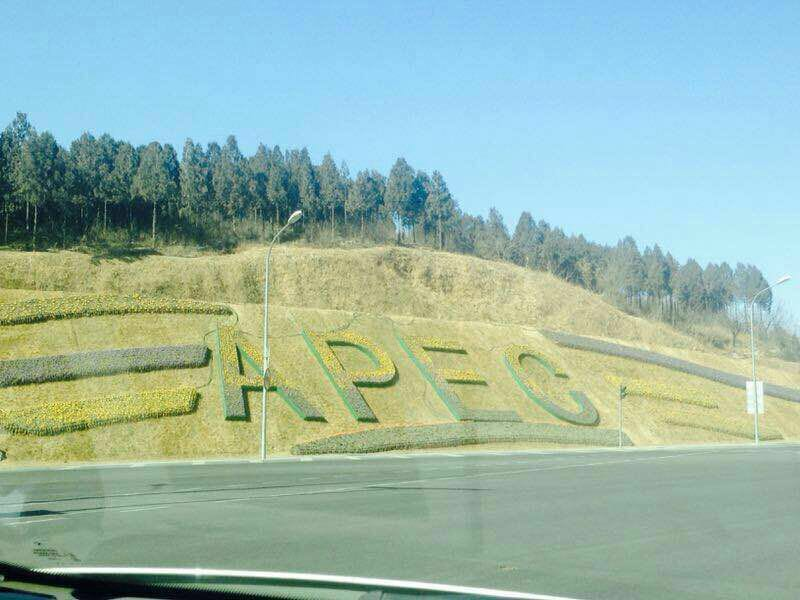
A photo of the blue sky in Beijing during the APEC 2014

In 2014, the Chinese Communist Party launched the APEC Blue initiative, a series of stringent environmental policies aimed at meeting emission targets, modernizing the state's image, and mitigating public anxiety over air pollution. The state takes a centralized, top-down approach to environmental regulations and pursues policy efficiency through blunt administrative instruments. China's environmental governance exemplifies authoritarian environmentalism, where expedient results often override procedural justice and sustainable development. The APEC Blue creates an international spectacle for the global audience but also perpetuates socio-economic divides in rural China.

== Background ==
=== Rising environmentalist movement ===
Before the implementation of the APEC Blue, public outcries pressured the state to establish environmental accountability and regulate industrial pollution. In early 2014, thousands of residents from Maoming, Guangdong Province, protested Sinopec's plan for an oil refinery plant that would discharge paraxylene into their neighborhood. Meanwhile, 20,000 Residents of Huifang village in Zhejiang petitioned the municipal government to withdraw an incineration power plant that released combustion pollutants into their community. Protests pushed back against industrial expansion, forcing the Chinese government to launch visible environmental reform.

=== Air quality in China ===
In 2014 the situation of China's air quality is quite concerning: Less than 1% of China's 500 cities have reached the air quality standard recommended by the World Health Organization. Among the 10 most polluted cities in the world, China has seven.

In Jan 2013, only five days were not occupied by haze and fog. In Oct 2014, the air quality index in Beijing reached a peak of 470, far beyond the severe pollution level of 300; meanwhile, the situation was even more serious in the neighboring province of Hebei, whose PM2.5 particles climbed above 500 micrograms per cubic meter—northern China was blanketed by the heavy air pollution, forcing the Chinese authorities to raise its pollution alert from yellow to orange, which was the second highest.

NOTES:

Level	Good	Moderate	Unhealthy for Sensitive Groups	Unhealthy	Very Unhealthy	Hazardous
Air Quality Index (AQI)	0-50	51-100	101-150	151-200	201-300	301–500

(The recommended exposure according to the WHO is 25. PM2.5 particles lodge deep inside the lungs and are considered the most dangerous kind of air pollution to human health)

=== APEC ===
APEC is the Asia-Pacific Economic Cooperation, a regional economic forum established in 1989 to leverage the growing interdependence of the Asia-Pacific region.

The APEC meeting was scheduled to be held in Beijing in November 2014, a city that is seriously polluted by haze and fog. The authorities were in a rush to clear the haze and fog in Beijing for APEC within a month.

== Process ==
=== Control campaign ===
During APEC in 2014, a set of comprehensively strict measures on controlling air pollution were carried out.

General Secretary of the Chinese Communist Party & President Xi Jinping, Premier Li Keqiang and Vice-Premier Zhang Gaoli were directly in charge of the clean-up campaign . Xi and Li issue a set of written instructions while Zhang monitor the anti-smog campaign in the fight of curbing air pollution. In addition, 434,000 cadres in Beijing and nearby provinces and municipalities, including Tianjin, Hebei, Shanxi, Shandong, Henan and inner Mongolia, were involved in the inspection work.

The core part of control measures laid on emission reduction. Roughly 10,000 factories in the regions surrounding Beijing were forced to suspend production during APEC, and an additional 39,000 ran on reduced schedules to largely alleviate pollution. Moreover, 60,100 industrial plants and 123,000 other ventures including construction sites and petrol stations are closely inspected.

In Beijing, around 11.7 million vehicles were kept off the roads by a ban on alternative days on cars with even-or-odd numbered license plates.

In addition, in Beijing, 6-days mandatory holidays were brought to state-owned enterprises, local government offices and educational institutions. As a result, real estate trade, marriage registration, food delivery, funerals and hospital appointment system were all influenced and disturbed during APEC.

=== Result of pollution control ===
Statistics showed that the control obtained certain results. According to the data from Beijing municipal environmental monitoring center, from November 1 to 12, the density of PM2.5, PM10, SO_{2} and NO_{2} decreased by 55%, 44%, 57% and 31% in the same period last year; the concentrations of various pollutant was at the lowest level over the same period in the past 5 years.

The density of air contaminants in Beijing during November 1 to 12, 2014

	PM2.5	PM10	SO_{2}	NO_{2}
Density	43μg/m^{3}	62μg/m^{3}	8μg/m^{3}	46μg/m^{3}

However, hours before the summit's opening ceremony, the air quality in this city still hovered at levels deemed as "unhealthy" by American embassy monitor in Beijing's air monitoring system. As a result, real estate trade, marriage registration, food delivery, funerals and hospital appointment system were all influenced and disturbed during APEC.

== Response ==
Most foreign media showed a doubtful position for "APEC blue," considering it as a "face-saving" strategy of China's rulers and holding a suspicious view about its sustainable future. Young Professionals in Foreign Policy claimed that APEC blue "was a piece of the illusion", because "President Xi Jinping used the summit partly as a show to demonstrate that China’s economic development was the linchpin for the entire Asia-Pacific region". In addition, China Current also pointed out that such cleaning sky control might induce more attention on air pollution from foreign media and complaint about air quality from netizens.

Within China, Zhong Nanshan, a deputy of the National People's Congress, said that joint efforts nationwide might cut the time for tackling China's smog problem to 10 years instead of 30 years suggested by experts.

== Impacts ==
  The APEC Blue initiative encompasses a series of environmental policies that perpetuate structural inequality along class, geographical, and gender lines. Specifically, the ban on commercial logging disproportionately harms older, rural laborers who endured masculine and menial work in remote areas of China.

In December 2014, President Xi Jinping addressed China's alarming ecological footprint and announced a ban on commercial logging of natural forests (Lo, 2020, p. 3).

 Afterward, the central government implemented radical reforestation reforms as part of the APEC Blue initiative, which aimed to reduce carbon emissions and improve air quality. For example, the logging ban drastically increased China's forest area and enhanced the forest's ability to absorb and sequestrate carbon (Lo, 2020, p.4). In 2020, Qui et al. (2020) estimated that ongoing reforestation would absorb 22.14% of China's CO2 emissions from 2020 to 2050.[19] 
  However, the radical forestry reforms created mass layoffs in state-owned forestry enterprises, which lost half of their original workforce. For example, younger workers migrated elsewhere to find precarious employment, but local communities failed to attract new talents. Meanwhile, older and less educated laborers lack transferable skills to seek alternative employment, while the loss of health insurance and social security further worsens their livelihood (Lo, 2020, p. 5). China's logging ban becomes a cautionary tale of social injustice, which marginalizes forestry communities and the rural poor who work there.

The employees of controlled factories might lose money because they were forced to take a "vacation" in normal workdays. "With orders and production halted, we’re losing money," Liu Zhenyu, a steel mill worker in Tangshan, said. Some employees seized the opportunity to go traveling, "The number of calls we received inquiring about short-distance overseas trips went up by 50 percent," according to the Beijing Mytour International Travel Service. Additionally, "domestic travel is also in high demand".

As in the northern part of China, Beijing and its surrounding area are freezing cold at night. "The local government turned the state heating network off during unseasonably cold weather, which made the residents enduring a cold few days. "

In order to perform the controls, the economic costs are massive, and all the more significant given recent forecasts of a slowdown for China's economy. Manufacturing Purchasing Managers Index (PMI) & Employment: Figures released by the National Bureau of Statistics and the China Federation of Logistics and Purchasing reflected excess capacity and weak demand. It also showed an unfavorable situation in the labor market. (The manufacturing PMI slipped to 50.3 from 50.8 in October, and the employment component eased 0.2 point in November.) Industrial Production: As Credit Suisse estimated, an approximated one-quarter of China's steel has been affected, 13% of its cement and 3% of its industrial output.

It will also bring with heavy pollution, as the heating system springs into life, regular volumes of traffic return to the roads, and local industry seeks to make up for losses.

== Follow-up ==
On January 1, 2015, China's new Environmental Protection Law started to be put into force.

On February 13, Zhai Qing, a vice minister for environmental protection, said that China needs to reduce emissions by 30 percent to 50 percent from current levels in order to achieve "APEC blue".

On February 28, 2015 Under the Dome, an independent documentary related to China's air pollution by famous reporter Chai Jing, was released online, and received more than 100 million cumulative views within 48 hours.

When China's annual Lianghui started on March 3, 2015, coping with the environmental problems was given particular attention. On March 7, China's new environmental minister Chen Jining attended his first press conference in Lianghui, and vowed stricter legal enforcement for improving pollution.

  However, the COVID-19 pandemic created an economic slowdown, so the state scaled back on APEC Blue to stimulate industrial recovery. For example, the central government has not implemented an action plan against widespread ozone pollution. Instead, officials approved more permits for coal-fired plants in the first three months of 2023 than in the entirety of 2021.[32] Ultimately, China's authoritarian environmentalism prioritizes economic growth over sustainable environmental accountability.

== Potential solutions ==
Suggested policies that emerged from APEC blue include subway expansion to reduce car dependence and to ban barbecuing and straw-burning, encourage an economic transition toward clean fuels to lessen the need of coal and convert waste products into fuel by applying new technologies. In government administration, harsher supervision and enforcement of penalization should be applied.
