= Kimry Bridge =

Kimry Bridge Кимрский мост
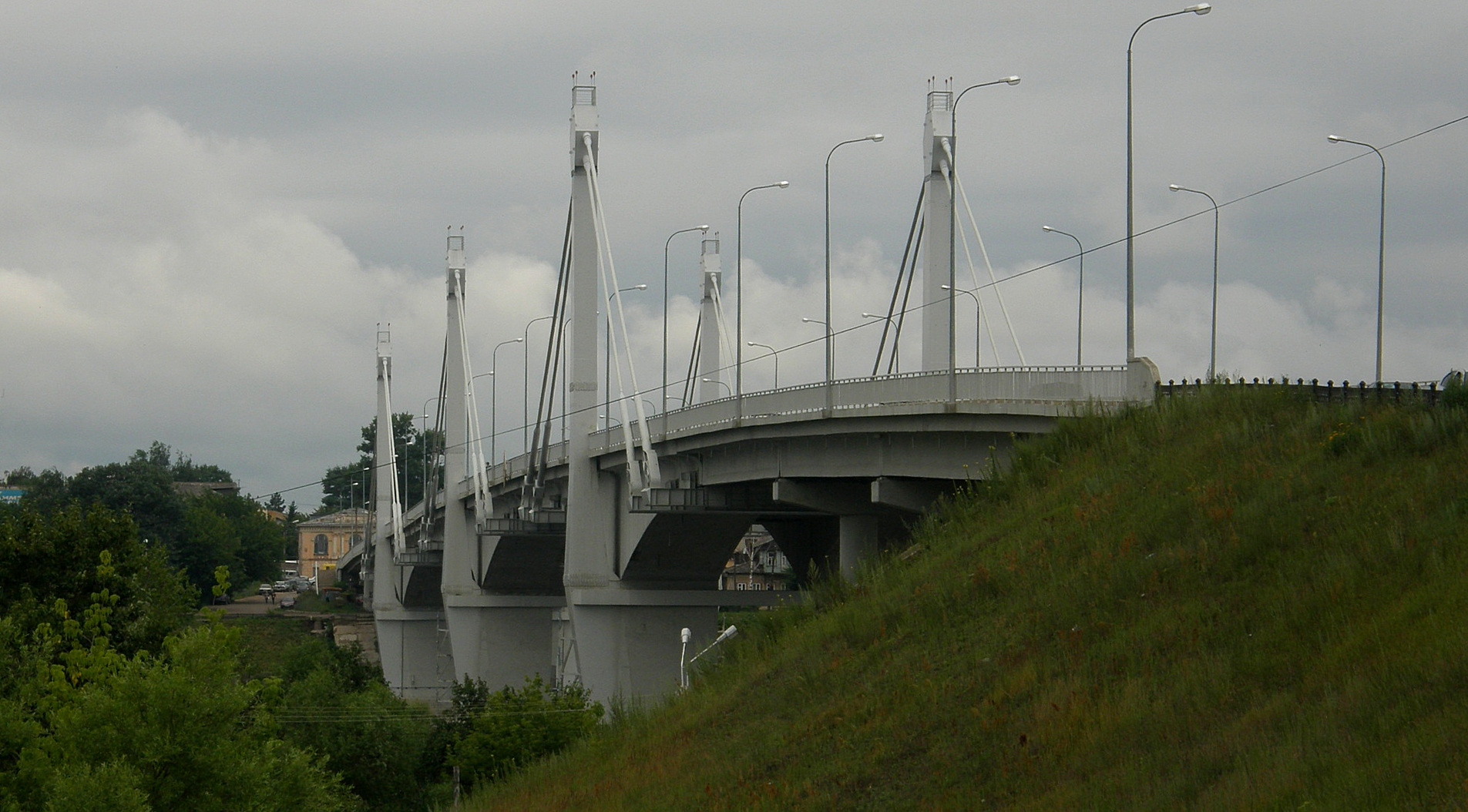
- Coordinates: 56.87311°N 37.36484°E
- Crosses: Volga
- Locale: Kimry, Tver Oblast, Russia

Location
- Interactive map of Kimry Bridge

The Kimry Bridge (Russian: Кимрский мост) is a road bridge crossing the Volga river, located in the city of Kimry. It is the longest bridge in Tver Oblast. The bridge was built in 1978 by Bridge Construction Team No. 6 (Yaroslavl) according to a standard design by the Voronezh Institute Giprokommundortrans.

== History ==
=== Reconstruction in 2005-2007 ===
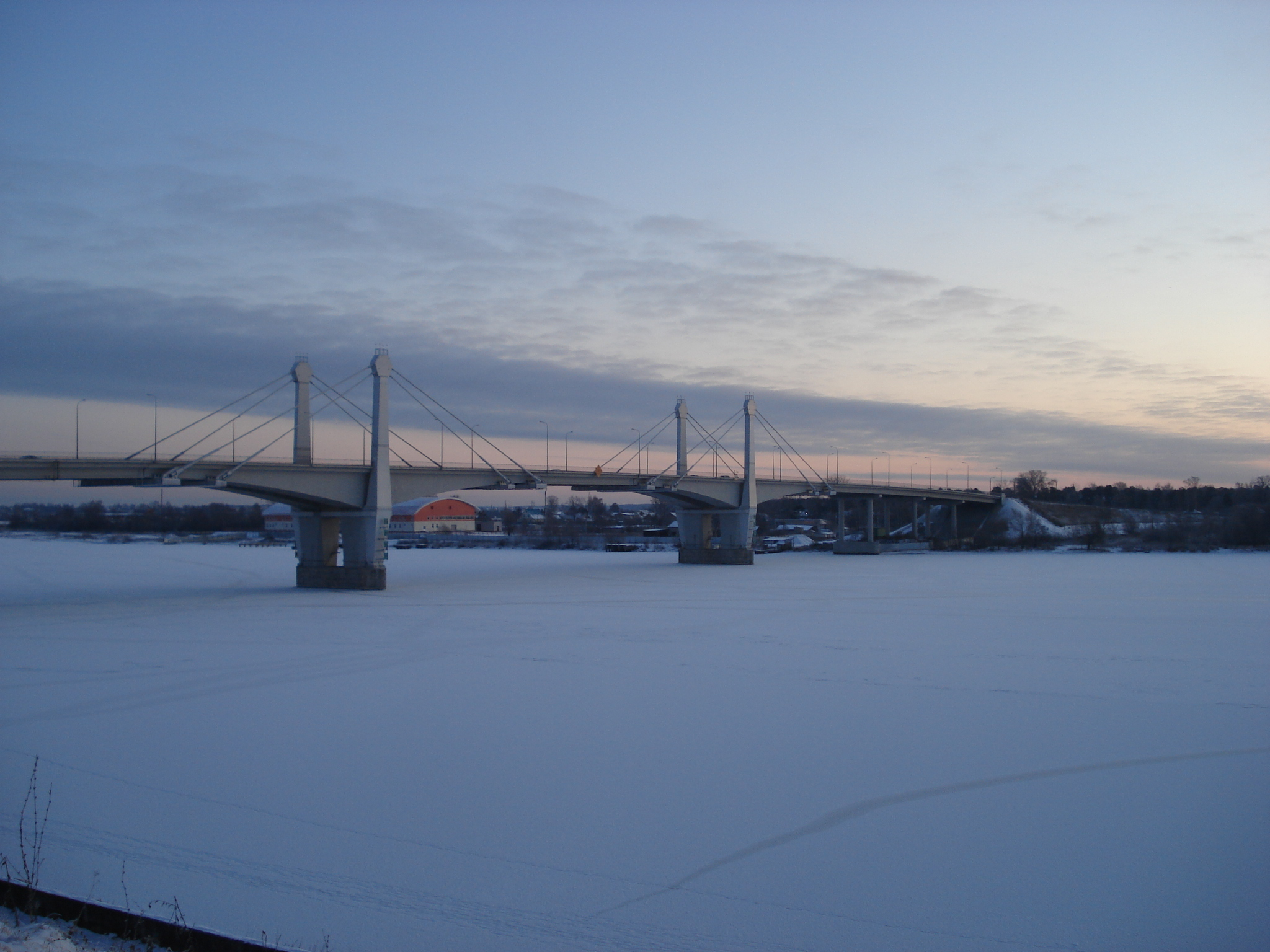
Bridge in the winter

In 2018, 7.7 million rubles were spent on repairing the bridge's asphalt surface.
