= Zolotoy Rog =

Bay in Russia

Coordinates: 43°06′30″N 131°53′55″E

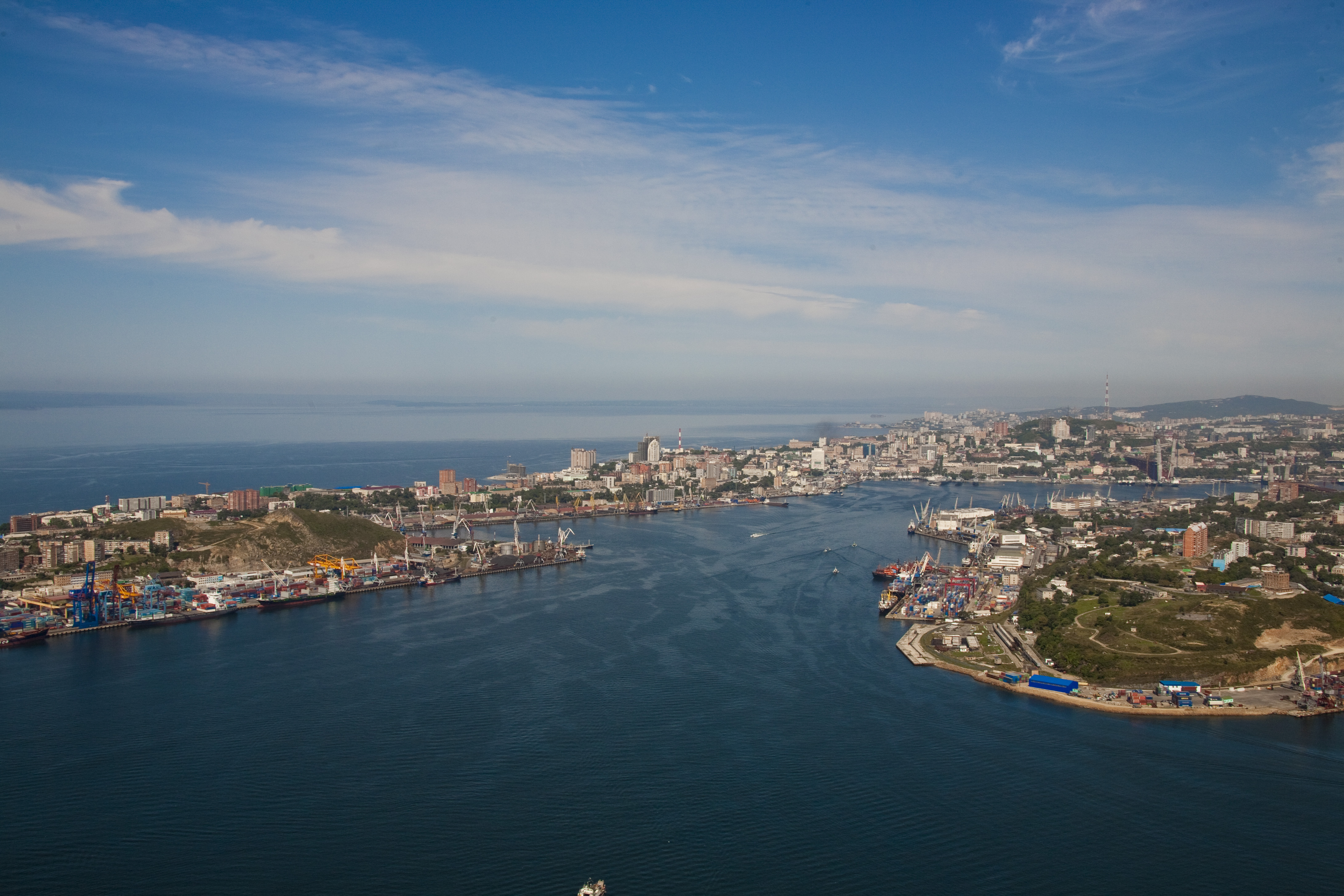
Zolotoy Rog Bay and Egersheld peninsula.

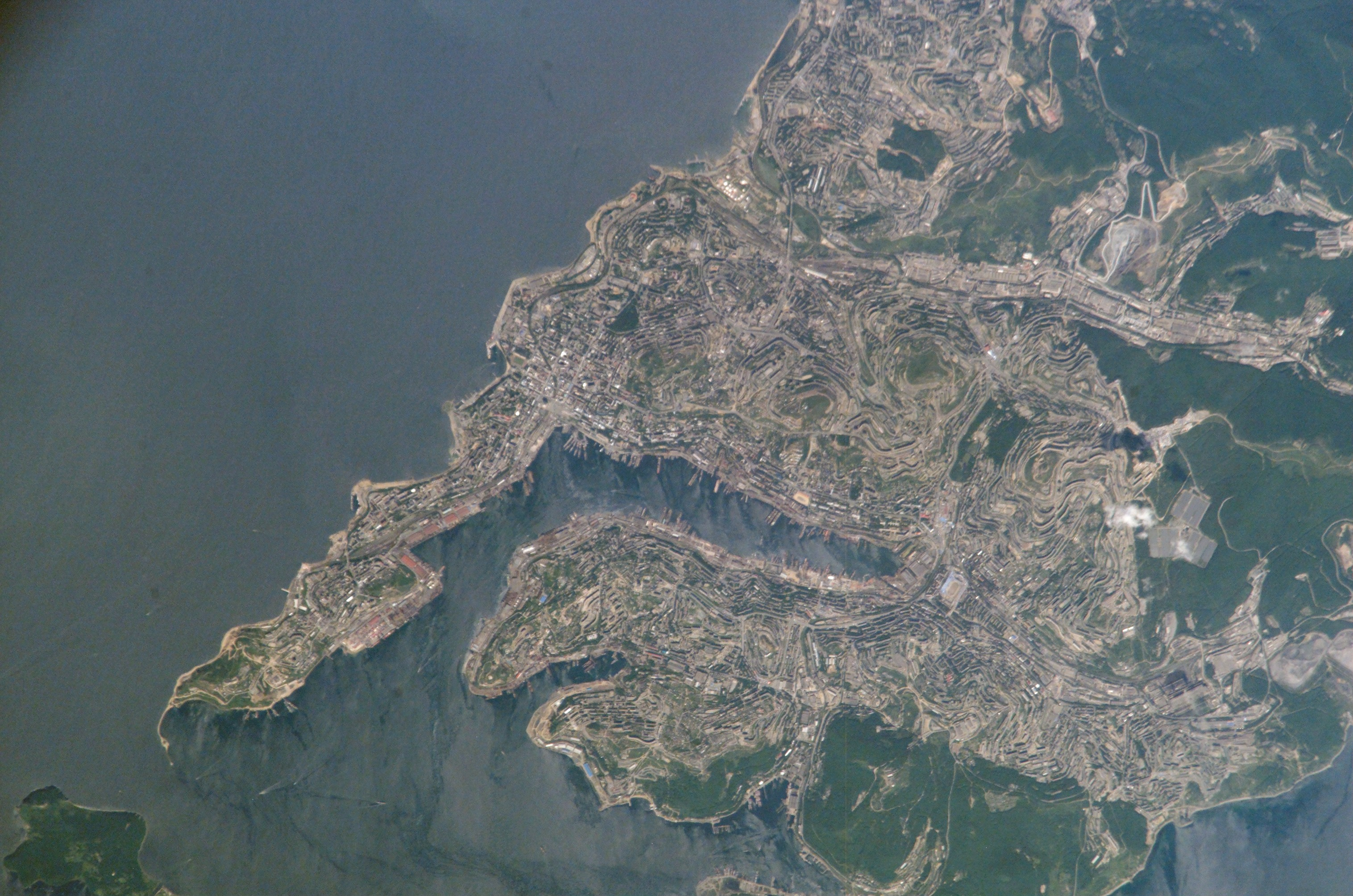
View of Vladivostok and Zolotoy Rog Bay from space.

Zolotoy Rog (Russian: Золотой Рог) or the Golden Horn Bay, is a sheltered horn-shaped bay of the Sea of Japan, located in coastal Primorsky Krai within the Russian Far East. Vladivostok, which lies on the hills at the head of the bay, is a major city and Russian port on the Pacific.

== Geography ==
It is separated from the Sea of Japan's Peter the Great Gulf by Shkota Peninsula on the northwest, Cape Goldobina on the east-northeast, and Cape Tigrovy on the west.

The bay is seven kilometers long, with a width of about two kilometers and a depth ranging from 20 to 27 meters.

== History ==
Until the mid-19th century, the bay was part of Imperial China in Manchuria, and was named "Gamat Bay".

The first European ship known to have anchored in the bay was a French whaler in 1852. During the Crimean War, the British ship Winchester visited the bay while searching for Vasily Zavoyko's squadron. The British sailors called the harbor Port May.

In 1859, Count Nikolay Muravyov-Amursky gave the bay its present name of "Zolotoy Rog", which means "Golden Horn" in Russian, alluding to a similarly shaped harbor in Constantinople.

== See also ==
- Bays of the Sea of Japan
- Landforms of Primorsky Krai
