= List of cemeteries in Russia =

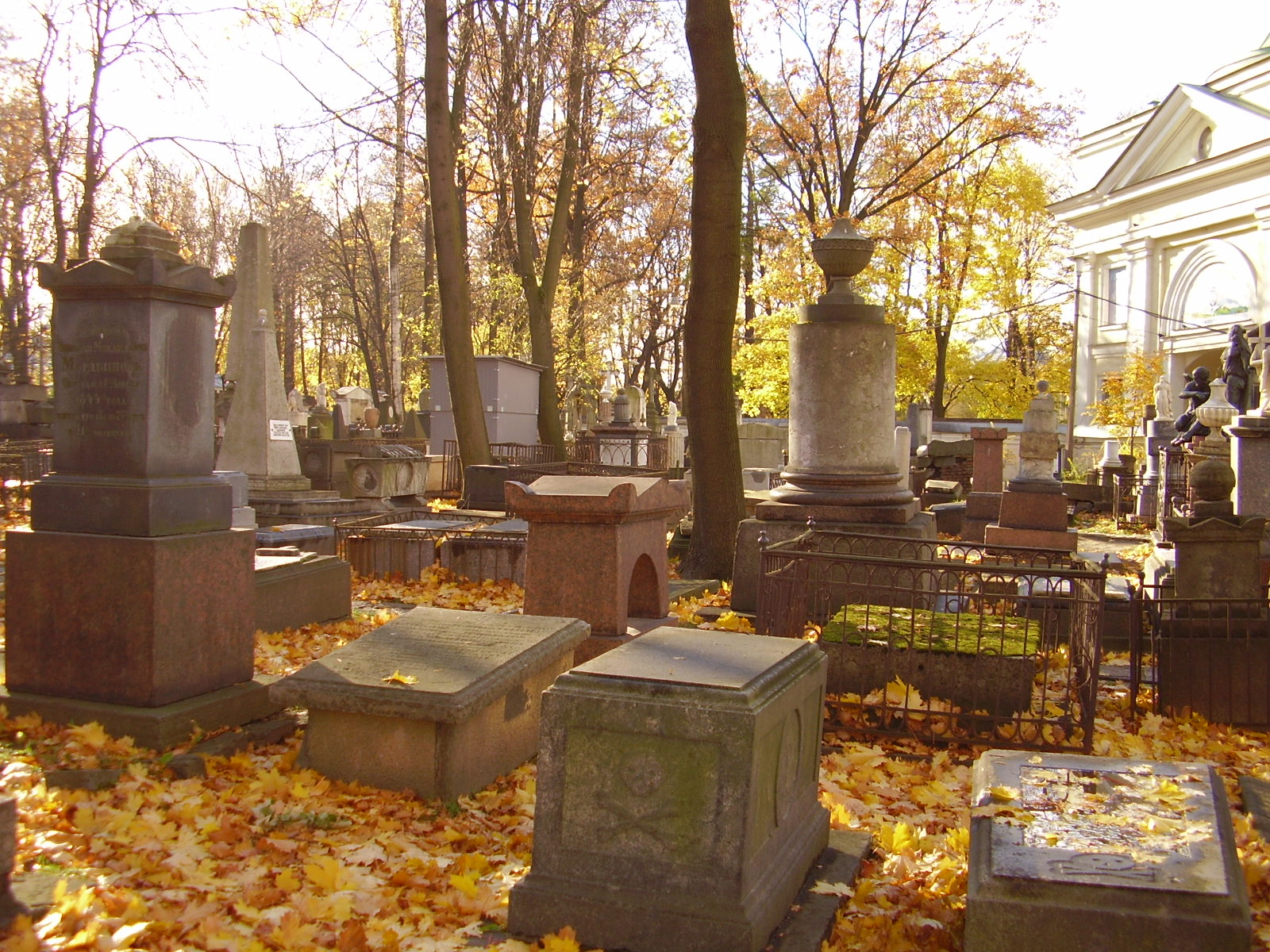
Graves and monuments in the Tikhvin Cemetery in Saint Petersburg

The following is an incomplete list of cemeteries in Russia.

== Republics ==
=== Dagestan ===
- Kyrkhlyar, Derbent

=== Tatarstan ===
- Arskoe Cemetery, Kazan

== Krais ==
=== Perm Krai ===
- Yegoshikha Cemetery, Perm

=== Primorsky Krai ===
- Czechoslovak Legions Graveyard, Vladivostok

== Oblasts ==
=== Arkhangelsk Oblast ===
- Archangel Allied Cemetery, Arkhangelsk

=== Kaluga Oblast ===
- Pyatnitskoye Cemetery, Kaluga

=== Leningrad Oblast ===
- Sologubovka Cemetery

=== Moscow Oblast ===
- Federal Military Memorial Cemetery
- Khovanskoye Cemetery
- Mitinskoe Cemetery

=== Novosibirsk Oblast ===
- Monument to the Heroes of the Revolution, Novosibirsk
- Yuzhnoye Cemetery, Novosibirsk
- Zayeltsovskoye Cemetery, Novosibirsk

=== Rostov Oblast ===
- Alexander Cemetery, Rostov-on-Don
- Brethren Cemetery, Rostov-on-Don
- Northern Cemetery, Rostov-on-Don
- Verkhne-Gnilovskoye Cemetery, Rostov-on-Don
- Mariupol Cemetery, Taganrog
- Taganrog Old Cemetery

=== Sverdlovsk Oblast ===
- The so-called 'Mafia cemetery' in Yekaterinburg, where murdered gangsters were buried under elaborately decorated gravestones.

=== Volgograd Oblast ===
- Rossoschka German War Cemetery

== Federal Cities ==
=== Moscow ===
- Old Donskoe Cemetery is an old necropolis next to the Donskoy Monastery.
- New Donskoy Cemetery is the 20th-century necropolis outside the monastery walls.
- Kremlin Wall Necropolis – part of the Kremlin Wall where Soviet governments buried many prominent Communist figures.
- Kuntsevo Cemetery
- Memorial park complex of the heroes of the First World War
- Moscow Armenian Cemetery
- Novodevichy Cemetery at the Novodevichy Convent, – many famous Russians and citizens of the former Soviet Union buried here including Nikita Khrushchev, Boris Yeltsin, the writers Nikolai Gogol and Anton Chekhov, and composers Sergei Prokofiev and Dmitri Shostakovich.
- Pantheon, Moscow – a Soviet project in the 1950s to construct a monumental memorial complex
- Preobrazhenskoye Cemetery
- Pyatnitskoye cemetery
- Rogozhskoye cemetery is the center of Old Believer community in Russia and the world.
- Troyekurovskoye Cemetery – burial site of Anna Politkovskaya, Alexander Yakovlev, and Boris Fyodorov
- Vagankovskoye Cemetery, the burial site of Inga Artamonova, Vladimir Vysotsky, Sergei Grinkov, Sergei Yesenin and others.
- Vvedenskoye Cemetery – cemetery of the former German community in Moscow

=== Saint Petersburg ===
- Bogoslovskoe Cemetery
- Kazachye Cemetery, part of the Alexander Nevsky Lavra.
- Lazarevskoe Cemetery, part of the Alexander Nevsky Lavra. The oldest surviving cemetery in the city. Scientist Mikhail Lomonosov and Leonhard Euler are buried here.
- Levashovo Memorial Cemetery
- Nikolskoe Cemetery, part of the Alexander Nevsky Lavra.
- Novodevichy Cemetery is part of the eponymous convent in St. Petersburg.
- Peter and Paul Fortress – all Russian Tsars since Peter the Great are buried in the Saints Peter and Paul Cathedral. Other members of the imperial family are buried in the Grand Ducal Burial Vault.
- Piskarevskoye Memorial Cemetery – burial ground for the victims of the Siege of Leningrad and probably the largest cemetery in the world by the number of people interred.
- Serafimovskoe Cemetery – opened in 1905, the location of numerous memorials
- Smolenskoye Cemetery was the traditional place of burial for the professors of the Imperial Academy of Arts and Saint Petersburg University
- Smolenskoye Lutheran Cemetery
- Tikhvin Cemetery, part of the Alexander Nevsky Lavra. Among those interred here is author Fyodor Dostoevsky and composer Pyotr Ilyich Tchaikovsky.
- Volkovo Cemetery one of the largest non orthodox cemeteries in Saint Petersburg

== Mass graves from executions ==
Near Moscow

- Butovo firing range
- Kommunarka shooting ground

Near Smolensk

- Katyn war cemetery

In Saint Petersburg

- Levashovo Memorial Cemetery –
- Rzhevsky artillery range near Toksovo (near Saint Petersburg)

In Tver Oblast

- Mednoye, Tver Oblast – (Mednoye memorial complex)

In Republic of Karelia

- Sandarmokh
