= Anna Sorokina (actress) =

Russian actress (born 1981)

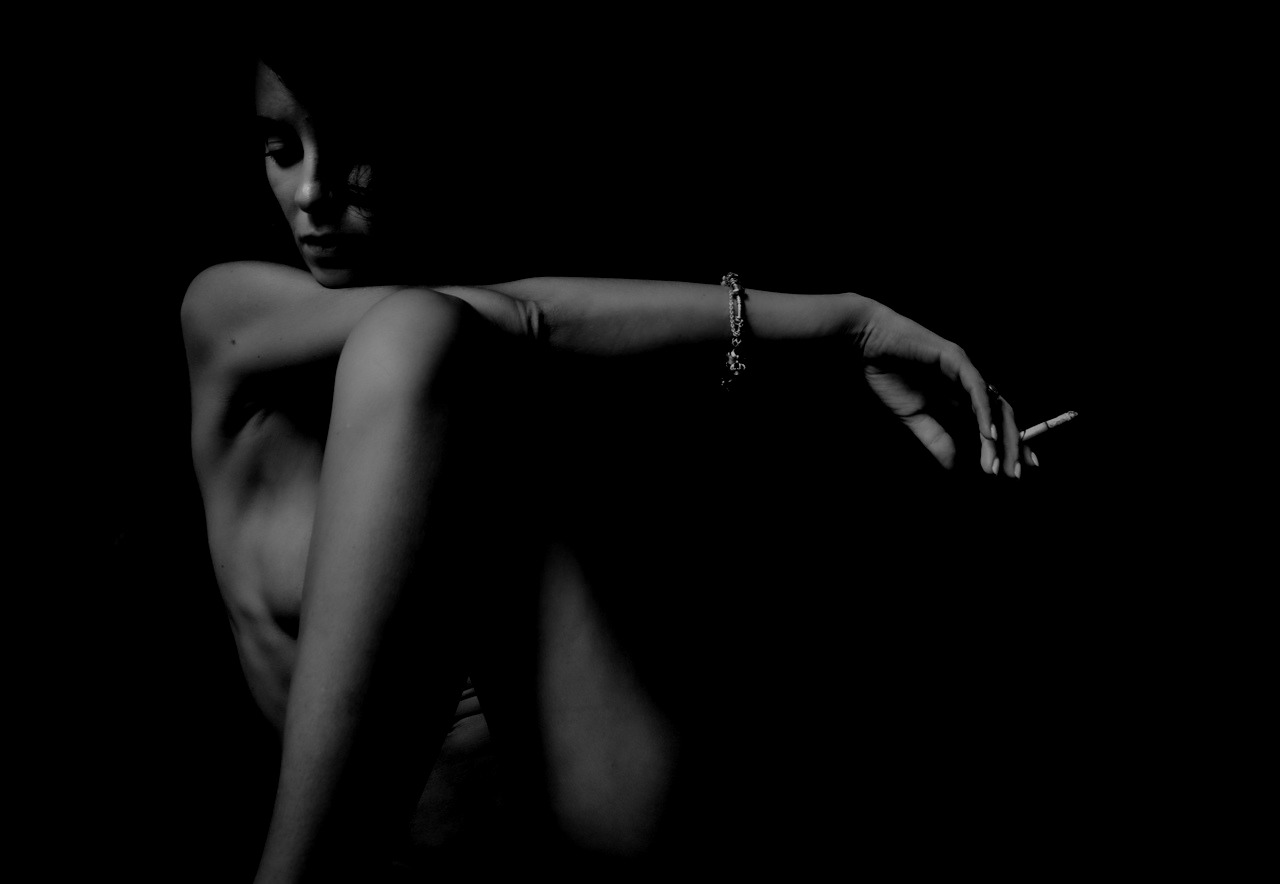
- Anna Sorokina in 2019
- Born: Anna Sergeyevna Sorokina; May 16, 1981 (age 45); Kaluga, Soviet Union
- Occupation: actress
- Years active: 2005-present

Anna Sergeyevna Sorokina (Russian: Анна Сергеевна Сорокина; born 1981 in Kaluga) is a Russian stage, film, and television actress.

== Biography ==
She studied at Kaluga School No. 5 (from 1988 to 1996) and Vocational Lyceum No. 13 (from 1996 to 1999).

Since childhood, she was a creative child. At the age of 17, she accidentally found herself among the episodes of Stanislav Govorukhin's film Voroshilov Sharpshooter, after which she finally decided to link her fate with the acting profession. She entered VGIK, but failed. In 2005 she graduated from the acting department of GITIS, after which she entered the troupe of the Kaluga Regional Drama Theatre. In 2011 she graduated from Sergei Taneyev's Kaluga Oblast College of Music (vocal department).

In 2019, as part of the theater troupe, she took part in the project Russian Theater Seasons in Cyprus with Dmitry Burkhankin's play Desperate Dreamers, where Sorokina's production and play were received very kindly. Also, the performance was presented in the framework of the prestigious VII Festival The Oldest Theaters of Russia.

== Personal life ==
She has a daughter, Polina, who was born in 2011.

== Theatrical works ==
=== Kaluga Regional Drama Theatre ===
- Aksyusha — The Forest (graduation performance)
- Nyura — Irkutsk Story (graduation performance)
- Vera Sergunova — Tomorrow was the War
- Prostitute — Threepenny Opera
- 60s Girl — Twelfth Night
- Rabbit — Winnie-the-Pooh and all, all, all
- Cat — The Bremen Town Musicians
- Totoshka — The Wizard of the Emerald City
- Lily — Alice in Wonderland
- Mona — The Nameless Star
- Tangeros — Waiting for Tango (film-performance)
- Girl — Twelfth Night, or Whatever
- Niece — Don Quixote
- Elsa's friend — Dragon
- Elizaveta Ivanovna, Ekaterina Ivanovna's sister — Ekaterina Ivanovna
- Valka Lebedina — Green Zone
- Stranger — If You Love, Find
- Larissa — The Bride's Room
- Armanda Bejart — Royal Comedian with Bronze Bows on Shoes
- Squirrel — Dunno and his friends
- Marya Konstantinovna, music teacher — The Fruits of Enlightenment
- Brownie — While She was Dying
- Young girl — Flight Attempt
- Darkie — The Adventures of Shipov, or Old Vaudeville
- Avdotya / Marya Antonovna — The Government Inspector
- Liza / Varvara — Russian Jam
- Lender — Krechinsky's Wedding
- Lisa — Cyrano de Bergerac
- Anna, the Queen's Maid of Honor — The Queen's Private Lives
- Strawberry — Cipollino is Looking for Treasure
- Hockey stick — Exhibits
- Maid of Honor — The Crystal Slipper
- Juliet now — Romeo and Juliet
- Godl — Memorial Prayer
- Gitel Mosca — Two for the Seesaw
- Resident of Avlabar — Khanuma
- Lyubov Ivanovna Otradina — Guilty Without Guilt
- Beatrice — The Venetian Twins
- Louise, the maid in his house — Eight Loving Women
- Mademoiselle de Chemreau — D'Artagnan and the Three Musketeers
- Bird — House of the Rising Sun
- Dunyashka — The Marriage
- Divchina — After two Hares
- Boyarynya — Ivan Vasilievich: Back to the Future
- Damma — The Boat
- Girl # 2 — Desperate Dreamers
- Trio 'Galatea' — Pygmalion
- Broadway Actress — The Divas, Or The Show Goes On
- Evil Queen — Pushkin's Tales
- Princess, White Rose, Rogue — The Snow Queen
- Julia Melville — The Rivals
- Galchonok — Miracles in Prostokvashino
- Visitors of the Salon — Show for Real Ladies
- Marie — The Nutcracker, or the Secret of the Nut Krakatuk
- Maid — No. 13
- Blanche DuBois — A Streetcar Named Desire

=== Kaluga Regional Philharmonic Society ===
- Anna Timiryova — The Last Love of Admiral Kolchak
- Marina Tsvetaeva — Soul That Knows No Measure

== Filmography ==
- Voroshilov Sharpshooter (1998) as episode (uncredited)
- Attention, says Moscow (2005) as episode (TV series)
- Sheriff (2010) as Secretary (TV series)
- Maryina Roshcha 2 (2014) as Delyagina's secretary (TV series)
- Sonata for Vera (2015) as Elena Makova, pianist (TV series)
- Ugly Girlfriend. Snow White's Mystery (2020) as Ruzhevskaya (TV series)
- The Librarian (2023) as mother at a children's party (TV series)

== Literature ==
- Famous Residents of Kaluga [encyclopedia] / Yu. Zelnikov. — Kaluga: Golden Alley (2013) page 271: ISBN 978-5-7111-0374-5
- Theatrical Life (2005) page 57
