= Aleksandra Troitskaya =

Russian microbiologist (1896-1979)

- Born: Aleksandra Sergeyevna Troitskaya; 26 May 1896; Bryankovo, Likhvinsky Uyezd, Kaluga Governorate, Russian Empire
- Died: 19 April 1979 (aged 82); Kaluga, Soviet Union
- Education: Kharkiv National Medical University
- Occupation: doctor

Aleksandra Sergeyevna Troitskaya (Russian: Алекса́ндра Серге́евна Тро́ицкая; 1896–1979) was a Soviet microbiologist-leprologist, candidate of medical sciences. She was an author of cancer vaccine, and an honorary citizen of Kaluga (1996).

== Biography ==
Troitskaya was born in Bryankovo (now in Suvorovsky District of Tula Oblast), grew up in Kaluga.

In 1917 she graduated from the Kaluga Diocesan School (she also studied with Konstantin Tsiolkovsky). In 1920s she worked as a teacher.

In 1934 she graduated from Kharkiv National Medical University. In 1940-1951 a microbiologist, from 1946 Senior Researcher of the Astrakhan Leprosarium.

In 1946, at the Kazan Federal University, she defended her thesis on pain biotherapy in the treatment of leprosy.

Since 1951 (after retirement) she worked as a microbiologist in the laboratory of the Kaluga Oncologic Dispensary.

She noted the presence of bacteria in human blood, and used that information to develop a treatment to fight cancer.She discovered new strains of corynebacteria — Corynebacterium Krestovnikova / Troitskaya.

Andrei Sakharov, who tried to use Troitskaya to treat his first wife's cancer, wrote about her in his memoirs.

== Died ==
Troitskaya died in 1979. Buried on Pyatnitskoye Cemetery in Kaluga.

== Bibliography ==
- Village News (1974)
- Mikhail Gavrilov. The Adventures of Capricorn (2017) ISBN 9785040064168
- Evgeny Dobrenko. Late Stalinism: The Aesthetics of Politics (2020) ISBN 9785444813348
