= Panchenko =

Panchenko (Ukrainian: Па́нченко) is a common Ukrainian surname. It may refer to:

- Alexander Panchenko (1953–2009), Russian chess grandmaster
- Anastasia Panchenko (born 1990), Russian sprint canoer
- Danylo Panchenko (born 1973), Ukrainian luger
- Diana Panchenko (born 1988), Ukrainian journalist and TV presenter
- Grigory Panchenko (1900–1966), Soviet general and Hero of the Soviet Union
- Kirill Panchenko (born 1989), Russian footballer, son of Viktor
- Lyubov Panchenko (1938–2022), Ukrainian artist
- Nikolai Panchenko (1924–2005), Russian poet
- Viktor Panchenko (born 1963), Russian footballer
- Yuriy Panchenko (born 1959), Soviet-Ukrainian volleyball player
