= Sologubovka Cemetery =

German military cemetery near St. Petersburg, Russia

- German War Graves Commission (Volksbund Deutsche Kriegsgräberfürsorge)
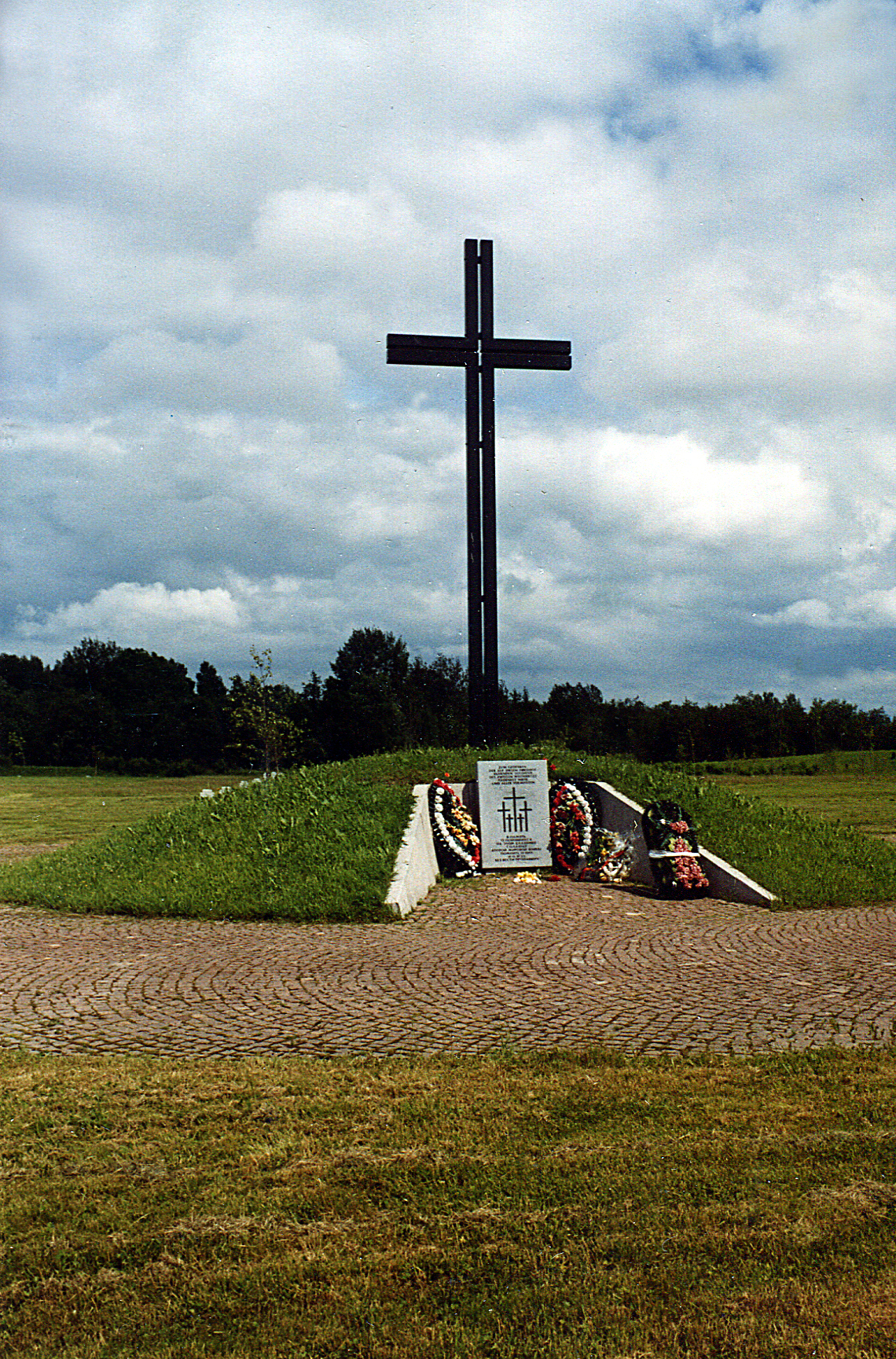
- The German military cemetery at Sologubovka
- Used for those deceased 1941–1944
- Established: 2000
- Location: 59°41′54″N 31°6′51″E near St Petersburg, Russia
- Total burials: 34,000+

Burials by nation
- Germany 34,000+

Burials by war
- World War II 34,000+

Sologubovka Cemetery is a German war cemetery and the final resting place of over 30,000 German war dead from World War II. Located 70 kilometres (43 mi) southeast of St. Petersburg in northwestern Russia, it has a capacity for a further 50,000 burials of previously lost German war dead.

== History ==
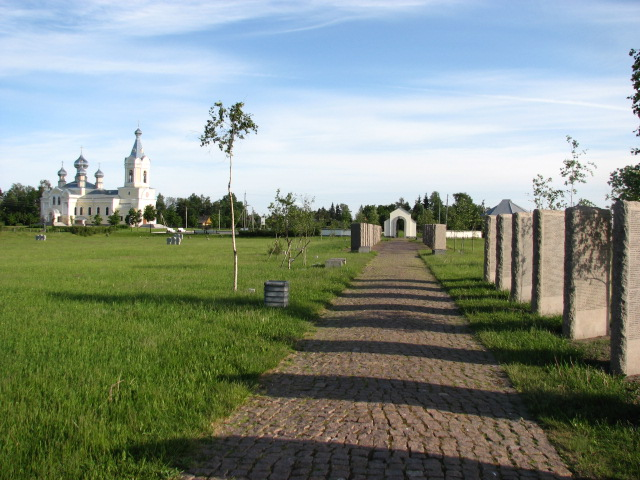
One of the central ways. In the background the Russian-orthodox church.

In September 2000, the Sologubovka Cemetery was opened in the presence of German and Russian officials, including many German veterans hoping to find lost comrades. The cemetery is one of dozens opened or refurbished since the end of the Cold War by the German War Graves Commission, which is tasked with restoring and maintaining the graves of German soldiers from both world wars. Most of the fallen soldiers remained lost or unknown for over forty years, their graves destroyed, abandoned or simply unknown.

== Russian sentiment ==
The cemetery's opening ceremony was boycotted by some Russian Siege of Leningrad veterans, but local residents showed appreciation for the refurbishment of the church and road improvements provided by Germany. More than 700,000 Soviets died during the Battle of Leningrad near Sologubovka fighting German forces and their allies, presumably including those Germans buried here. Lingering anti-German sentiment over the war in general and the fact that the USSR frequently did not bury its own war dead was mentioned in the press, but no protests or overt hostility towards the new German presence was reported.

== Lost German war dead ==
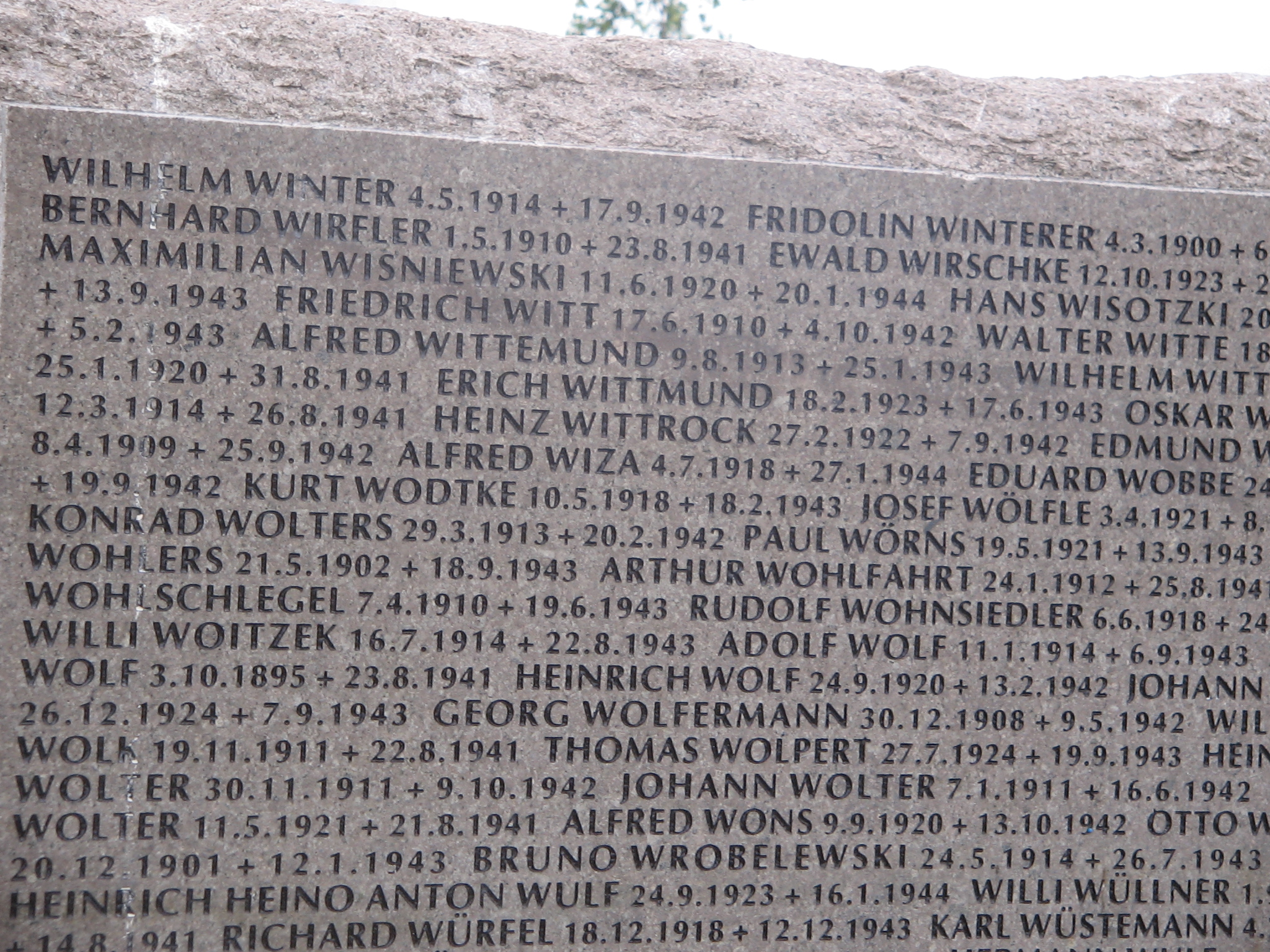
Sologubovka Cemetery: Names of dead soldiers

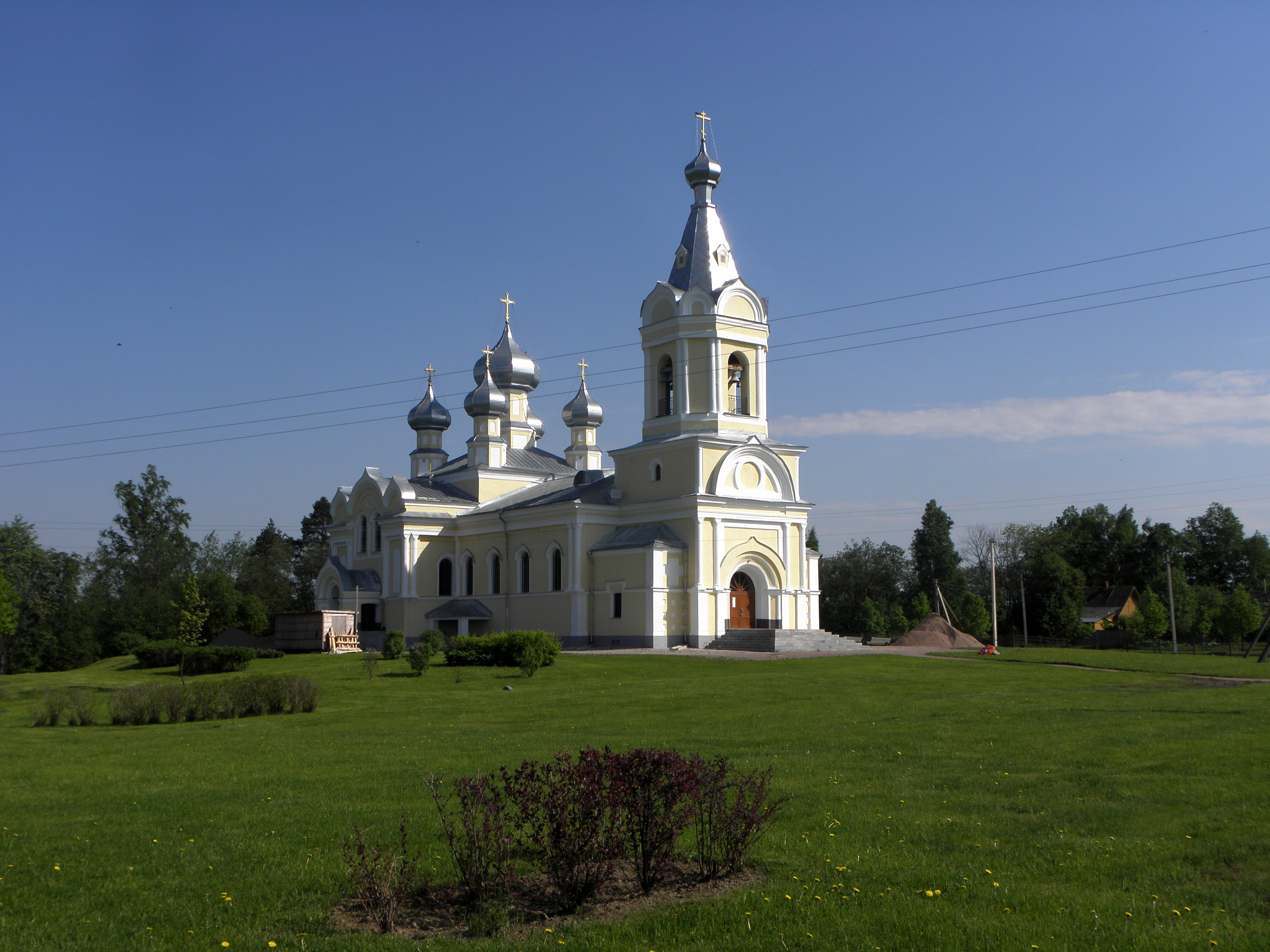
Orthodox Church

Up to 10,000 German military dead are found and buried each year in this part of Russia. The cemetery has become a point of reconciliation between German and Russian youth, who jointly search for unmarked graves around Sologubovka and elsewhere in Russia. The Goethe-Institut sponsors events and exhibitions at Sologubovka Cemetery to heighten awareness of the missing soldiers from World War II and to facilitate mutual German-Russian understanding and recognition of war dead. The German War Graves Commission estimates there are still many thousands of German unmarked war graves throughout Russia and areas of the former Eastern Front but has successfully located and reinterred over 600,000 in German sponsored cemeteries like Sologubovka since the end of the Cold War.

== See also ==
- Operation Barbarossa
- Siege of Leningrad
- List of battles by casualties
- Army Group North
- Piskaryovskoye Memorial Cemetery
- Golm War Cemetery
- List of cemeteries in Russia
