= Yevgeny Obolensky =

Russian military officer (1796–1865)

- Евге́ний Оболе́нский
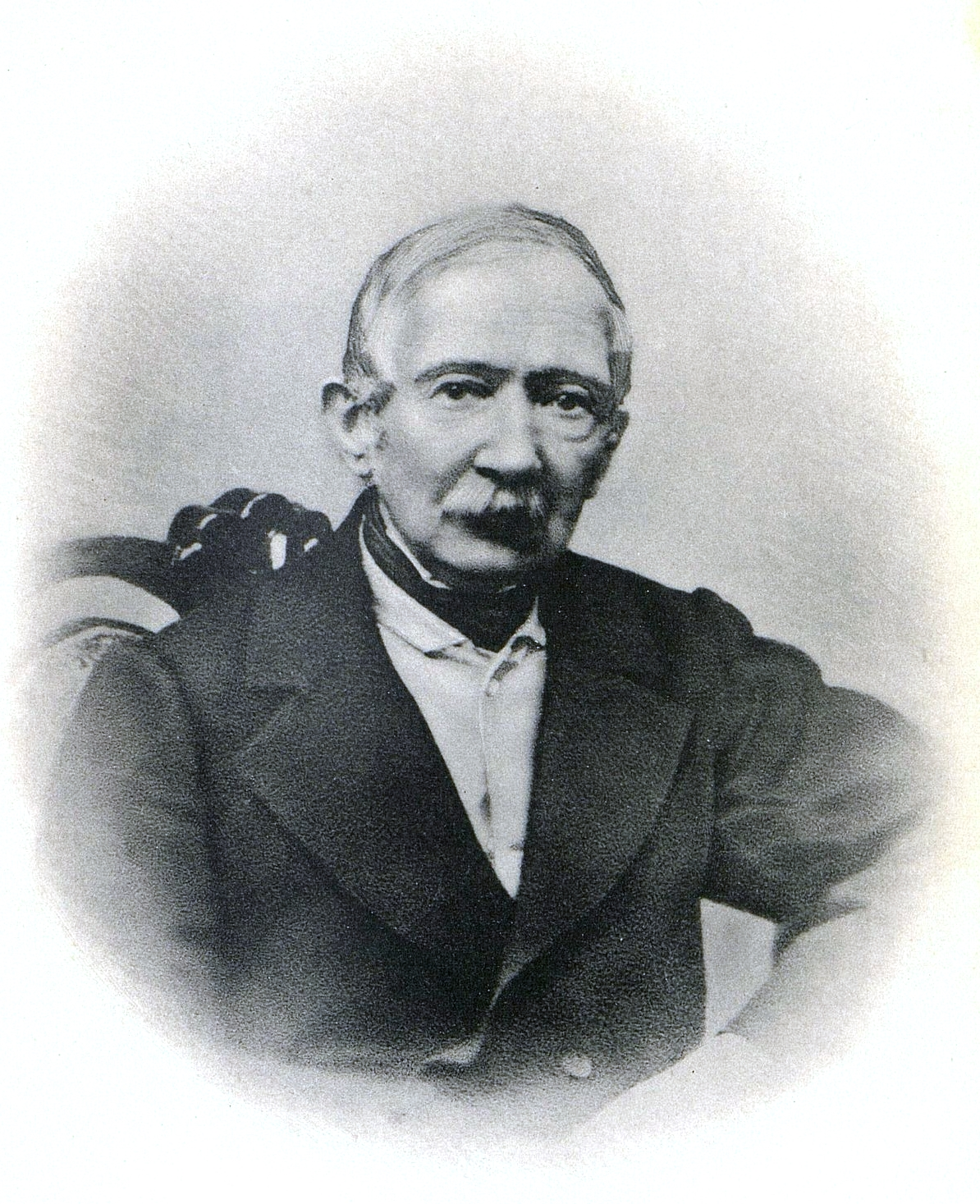
- Born: Yevgeny Petrovich Obolensky; 17 October 1796; Novomyrhorod, Russian Empire
- Died: 10 March 1865 (aged 68); Kaluga, Russian Empire
- Resting place: Pyatnitskoye Cemetery, Kaluga
- Occupation: officer
- Spouse: Varvara Baranova

Prince Yevgeny Petrovich Obolensky (Russian: Евге́ний Петро́вич Оболе́нский, 17 October [O.S. 6 October] 1796 – 10 March [O.S. 26 February] 1865) was a Russian officer from the Obolensky family, one of the most active participants in the Decembrist revolt.

== Biography ==
Yevgeny Obolensky was born in family of Prince Pyotr Nikolaevich Obolensky (1760–1833), the future governor of Tula. He was educated at home. At first, he served in the military together with his younger brother Konstantin. In March 1814, they entered the 1st training squadron of the Life Guards Artillery Brigade; on 14 October 1817 they were transferred to the Life Guards Pavlovsky Regiment. Obolensky was a supporter of the unification of the Northern and Southern Societies, and conducted negotiations on this in 1824 with Pavel Pestel. He was elected chief of staff on the eve of the uprising, and on 14 December 1825, commander of the insurgent forces instead of Sergei Trubetskoy, who failed to show up. In the course of the uprising, Obolensky was arrested and imprisoned in the Peter and Paul Fortress on December 15 after murdering General Mikhail Miloradovich.

Obolensky was condemned to deprivation of his princely title and on 10 July 1826 he was sentenced to life imprisonment; on 21 July 1826 shipped to Siberia. Even before his arrival on 27 August 1826 in Irkutsk, the term of penal servitude was reduced to 20 years.

Together with Aleksandr Yakubovich, he was sent to the Usolye-Sibirskoye salt plant, but on 6 October 1826, he was returned to Irkutsk and on 8 October, he was sent to the Blagodatsky mine. On 20 September 1827 he was sent to the Chita prison, where he arrived on September 29, suffering from scurvy.

On 8 November 1832, the term of penal servitude was reduced to 15 years, and on 14 December 1835 to 13 years.

After serving the penal term, Obolensky was exiled to Kaluga. There, he engaged in social activities. He took part in the preparation of the Emancipation reform of 1861.

Having requested for permission to live in Moscow, his first petition was rejected on 15 December 1857. The second petition was granted on 2 April 1861.

Obolensky died in Kaluga on 10 March 1865. He was buried at Pyatnitskoye Cemetery.
