= Vera Zorina (singer) =

Russian opera singer

Vera Vasilyevna Zorina
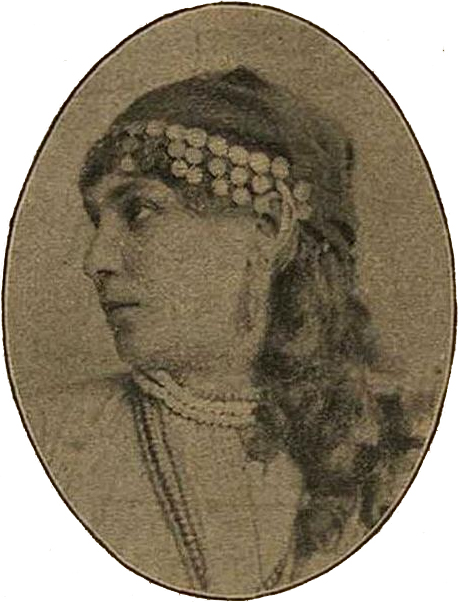
- Born: Vera Vasilyevna Popova; 1853
- Died: 1920 (aged 66–67)
- Occupation: operetta singer

Vera Vasilyevna Zorina (Russian: Вера Васильевна Зорина; real surname Popova; 1853 - 1920) was a Russian operetta singer (mezzo-soprano), best known as a Russian romances (or 'Gypsy art-songs') performer. She became famous after playing the part of Stesha in the popular musical Gypsy Songs in Characters by Nikolai Kulikov. Another highly popular part of hers was La Périchole in Jacques Offenbach's operetta. Vera Zorina (an ethnic Russian) is regarded as a founder of the "Gypsyan line" in Russian operetta.
