= Nikolai Panchenko =

- Born: Nikolai Vasilievich Panchenko; April 9, 1924; Kaluga
- Died: August 18, 2005 (aged 81); Peredelkino
- Occupation: Poet

Nikolai Vasilievich Panchenko (Russian: Никола́й Васи́льевич Па́нченко; April 9, 1924, Kaluga – August 18, 2005, Peredelkino) was a Russian poet.

== Biography ==
Born in the family mathematics teacher. Since 1942, the youngest airman as part of 242 th Regiment 321st Air Division on Voronezh Front, 1st Ukrainian Front and 4th Ukrainian Front. Twice wounded and seriously injured. Member of the CPSU since 1944.

In 1945 he returned to Kaluga. Graduated Kaluga State University (1949), Higher Party School (1953). There was a journalist who headed the regional Komsomol newspaper Young Leninist, worked in a factory. Since 1961 editor of the Kaluga publishing house, he became the initiator and member of the editorial board of the famous almanac Tarusa Pages. In the same year he moved to Moscow and was admitted to the Union of Soviet Writers.

He graduated from the State Higher literary courses (1963).

In 1965 he signed a collective letter in defense Sinyavsky–Daniel trial.

During perestroika is one of the founders of the movement April, support the policies of Gorbachev. Chairman of the literary heritage commission Vladimir Narbut.

Member of the editorial board of the journals Russkoye Bogatstvo (1991–95) and Day and Night.

Buried at Peredelkino Cemetery.

The wife – the daughter of Victor Shklovsky Varvara Shklovskaya-Kordi.
