= Czechoslovak Legions Graveyard in Vladivostok =

Cemetery

Coordinates: 43°05′N 131°56′E

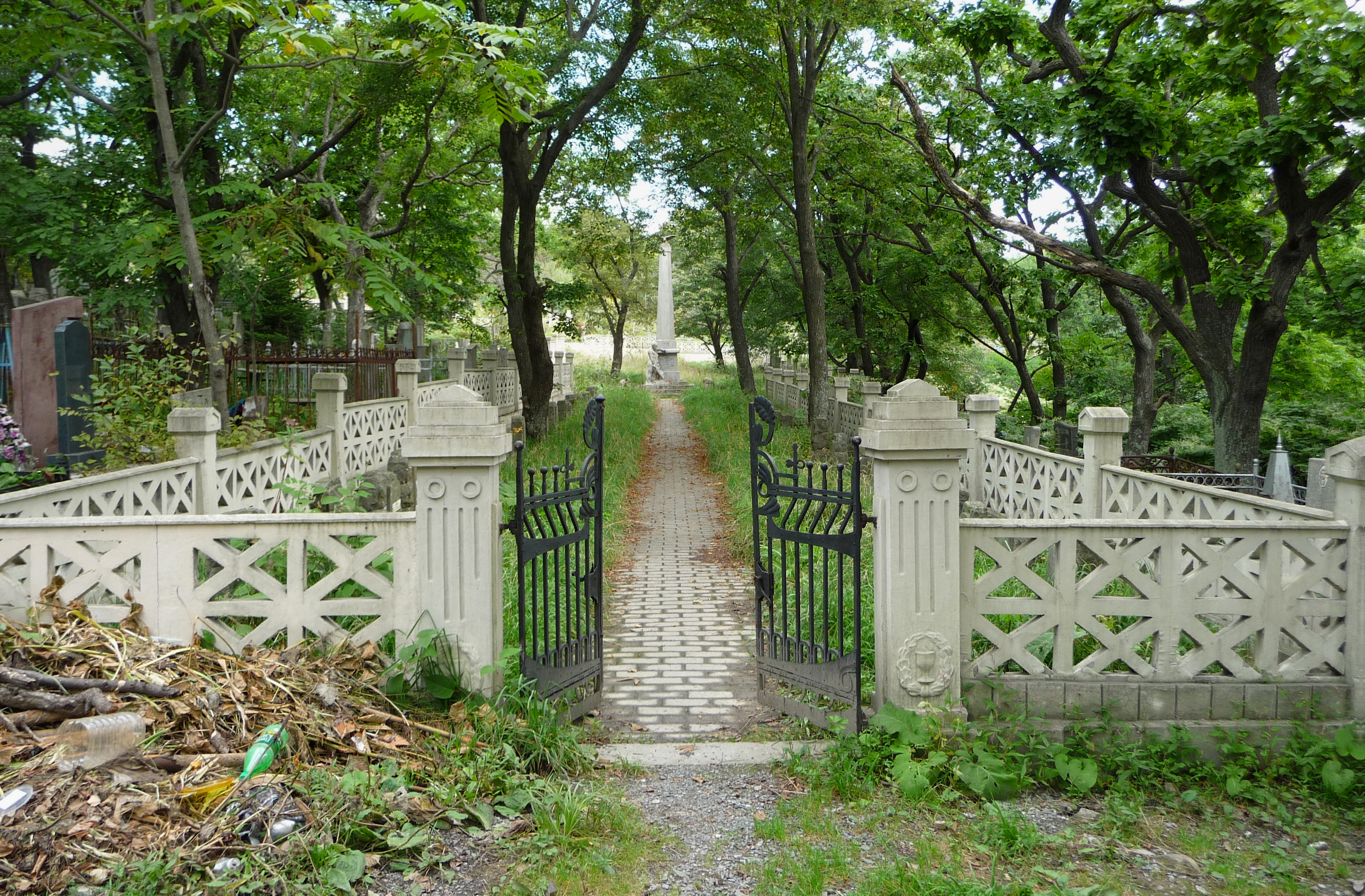
Entrance to the graveyard

Czechoslovak Legions Graveyard in Vladivostok (Czech: Pohřebiště československých legionářů ve Vladivostoku, Russian: Кладбище чехословацких легионеров во Владивостоке, also known as Czech Republic Cemetery) is a graveyard of the Czechoslovak Legions in Vladivostok, Russia. In total there are buried 163 Czechoslovak legionnaires, who fought in the Russian Far East in between 1918 and 1920. In 2005 the graveyard was reconstructed at the expense of the Czech Republic and in May 2006 it was reopened.
