= Verkhne-Gnilovskoye Cemetery =

- Верхне-Гниловское кладбище (Russian)
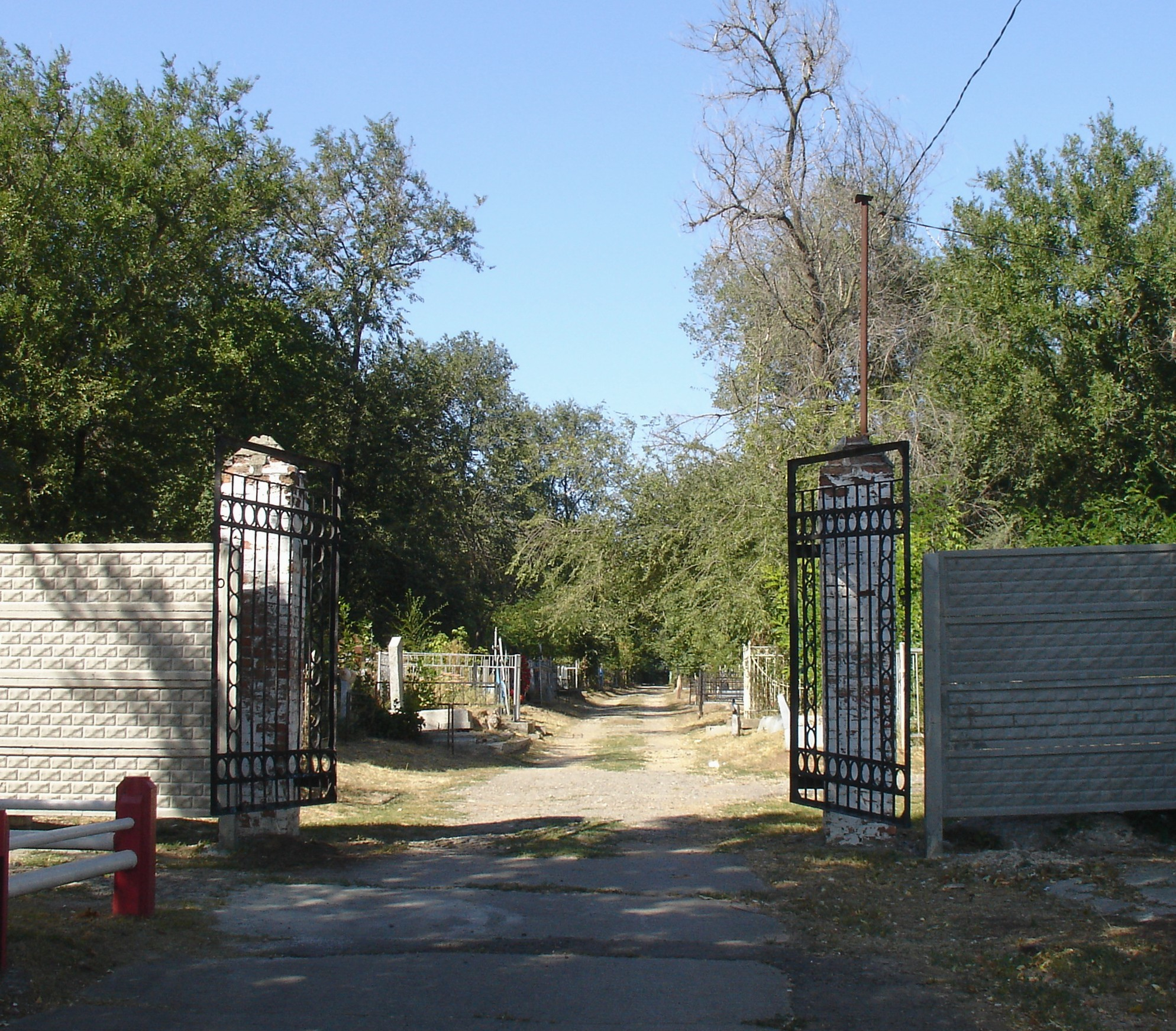
- Interactive map of Verkhne-Gnilovskoye Cemetery
- 47°12′12″N 39°40′9″E
- Type: Cemetery
- Location: Rostov-on-Don, Rostov oblast, Russia

Verkhne-Gnilovskoye Cemetery (Russian: Верхне-Гниловское кладбище, "Upper Gnilovskoy cemetery") is a cemetery in Rostov-on-Don, Russia. In 2015, areas of the cemetery were described as "impassible thickets".

== History ==
The cemetery is located in Rostov-on-Don. The territory of the cemetery is limited with three streets – Portovaya, Kulagina and Meydunarodnaya. Total area is 4.5 hectares. In 1998, when the Northern cemetery had problems with new places, sub-burials in related graves were resumed.

During the war, warriors who were killed in the battle for Rostov's liberation were buried in mass graves. A monument was created to their memory. A monument to pilots who died in a helicopter crash "Mi-6" was created in the main alley in 1969.

== Famous people buried in the cemetery ==
Vladimir Semenovich Shcherbakov (1891–1967), a machinist on the Russian cruiser Aurora, was buried in Upper-Gnilovsky cemetery.

Jenya Repko, young Rostov hero of The Great Patriotic war, was buried there too.
