= Kaluga Regional Drama Theatre =

- Kaluga Drama
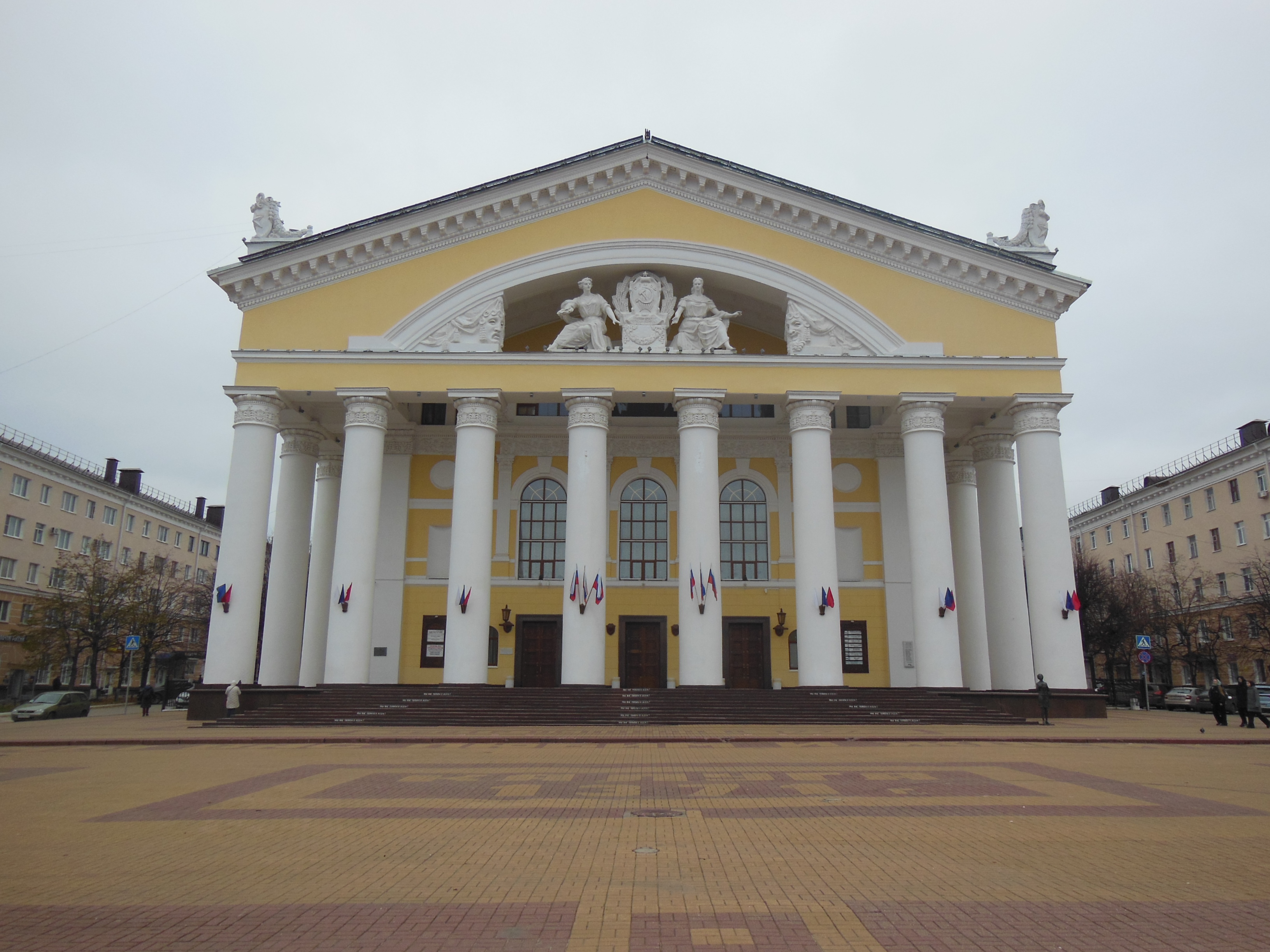
- Theatre building. 2024
- Interactive map of Kaluga Regional Drama Theatre
- Address: 248001, Theatrical square, 1 Kaluga; Russia
- Coordinates: 54°30′56″N 36°15′31″E
- Owner: State theatre
- Seating type: soft seat
- Capacity: 697 (main stage); 60 (small stage); 45 (stage under the roof)
- Type: Drama
- Current use: ₽ – (rub)
- Public transit: bus: 3, 4, 42, 77, 98 trolley: 3, 18

Construction
- Opened: January 19, 1777
- Reopened: 1842, 1875, 1958
- Rebuilt: 1958
- Years active: 1777–present
- Architect: Ivan Zholtovsky

Website
- Official webcite

Kaluga Regional Drama Theatre (Russian: Калужский областной драматический театр) is a Russian theatre in Kaluga. One of the oldest operating drama theaters of Russia (since 1777).

== History ==
The first Governor-general of Kaluga region Mikhail Krechetnikov was a great admirer of arts. By his decision drama theatre was established in Kaluga on 30 January [O.S. 19 January] 1777.

Four actors and an actress from St. Petersburg were invited to the new theatre. Other actors were recruited from residents of Kaluga. Thus, the first theatrical company in Kaluga has been created.

Writing of the play for the first night has been ordered to the famous Russian playwright and poet Vasily Maykov which came out under the name of Prologue on opening of the Kaluga Region.

Opening of the theatre and its first season has taken place at a big congestion of the people. Many prominent guests were invited and the high-ranking persons from the whole country of Russia. The famous playwright and the composer of that time N. S. Titov who at a personal request of Mikhail Krechetnikov directed reorganization of the building and a set of actors becomes the art director.

Maria Savina, the famous Russian actress and later the chairman of the Russian theatrical society, as well as the singer Vera Zorina performed there, in 1871 and 1872, respectively.

In 1879-1880 year the drama actor and the impresario, one of the leading figures of Maly Theatre Alexander Rasskazov worked with the theatre.

In 1888 the playwright Nikolay Solovyov, some of his works were either banned censorship or rejected by the Theatrical and Literary Committee, produced here Light Without Heat he co-authored with Alexander Ostrovsky, as well as the melodrama Honeymoon ("Медовый месяц").

On donations of residents of Kaluga and the province, in 1875 the theatre building is erected on Sennaya Square which existed up to the end of 1941.

"With direct participation and efforts" of N. D. Tilling-Kruchinin, in 1897, for the first time in Kaluga, in theatre the "Cinematograph Lumiere" has been shown "that has caused a great delight of the audience and local press".

During World War I the theatre endures crisis, the constant troupe was absent, on a scene various enterprises went on tour.

February and October revolutions in 1917 have led to a radical reorganization of all theatre life of Russia and the city. In the summer of 1919 the Council of People's Commissars establishes the decree "About association of theatrical business". By this decree "the young proletarian state" has nationalized theatres and all theatrical property.

The Kaluga theatre turns into "Narkompros" (national education) maintaining.

In the country there was a Civil war, hunger and ruin reigned, and interest of the Kaluga viewer in theatre was so big that tickets were bought up right after opening of cash desks – all places, including also "gallery". Before a premiere near the theatre building quite often it was possible to meet people who exchanged tickets for things, products, or sold them for two-three prices from normal.

From the beginning of the World War II, in July 1941 from actors of theatre has been created the front crew which addressed the military units standing near Kaluga, Yukhnov, Yelnya. Actors of theatre: Lev Maretsky, Irina Blazhnova, Ivan Kalinin participated in military operations. Vaneeva and Sladky were home front workers. For fighting and labor merits they have been awarded the state awards of USSR.

In post-war years wide recognition of the audience was gained by a number of great masters of a scene: Valentina Nikitina, Polina Vaneeva, Sergey Sladky, Feofan Maysky, Lidiya Volskaya, Tamara Valasiadi, Alexander Dodonkin, Alexey Tyurin, Irina Blazhnova, Vladimir Romanovsky, Tamara Antonova.

In 1950 the theatre is headed by the young director Zinovy Korogodsky, subsequently the chief director of the Leningrad Theatre for young spectators.

In Kaluga he puts the first independent performances: "Comrades Moscovites" ("Товарищи москвичи"), "The truth is good, but happiness is better" ("Правда хорошо, а счастье лучше"), "Dance teacher" ("Учитель танцев"), "Traktirshchitsa" ("Трактирщица").

The building of theatre takes a modern form only in 1958, built up anew after numerous destructions, the fires and reorganizations. The chief directors of theatre in different years: David Lyubarsky, Roman Sokolov, Alexander Pletnyov.

In the fall of 2016, Kaluga regional drama theatre has opened the 240th theatrical season.
