= Mariupol Cemetery =

Cemetery in Taganrog, Russia

- Мариупольское кладбище (Russian)
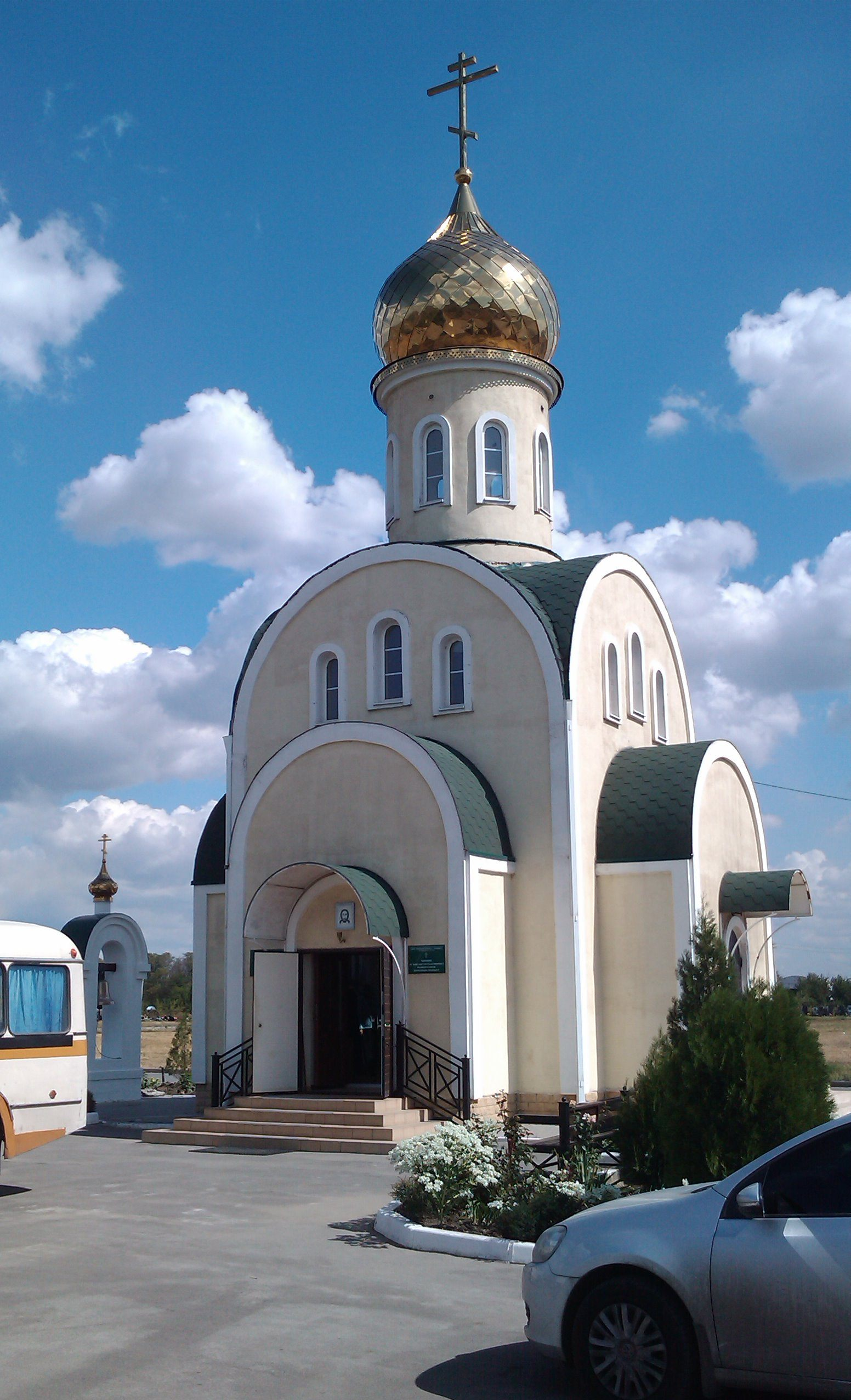

- Location within Russia
- Type: Chapel
- Location: Taganrog, Rostov oblast Russia

History
- Built: 1475

Site notes
- Owner: MAU "Ritual"

Mariupol Cemetery is a cemetery in Taganrog, Rostov Oblast, Russia. It is noted for housing the Chapel of Alexander Nevsky.

== Chapel of Alexander Nevsky ==
In 2008 in commemoration of the 65th anniversary of the liberation of Rostov region, under an initiative of Abbot Svyato-Troytskovo parish (archpriest Timofey Fetisov), a memorial chapel was built on the Mariupol Cemetery, and dedicated to Alexander Nevsky.

The Chapel of Saint Warrior-Prince Alexander Nevsky is 15 metres high and is located near the graves of Soviet soldiers and officers on the Walk of Fame. There is a memorial wall with a list of the divisions that liberated Taganrog. Every day, funeral services and requiems for deceased are offered in the chapel, as well as readings from the Psalter.
