= Kaluga =

City in Kaluga Oblast, Russia

Kaluga Калуга
- City
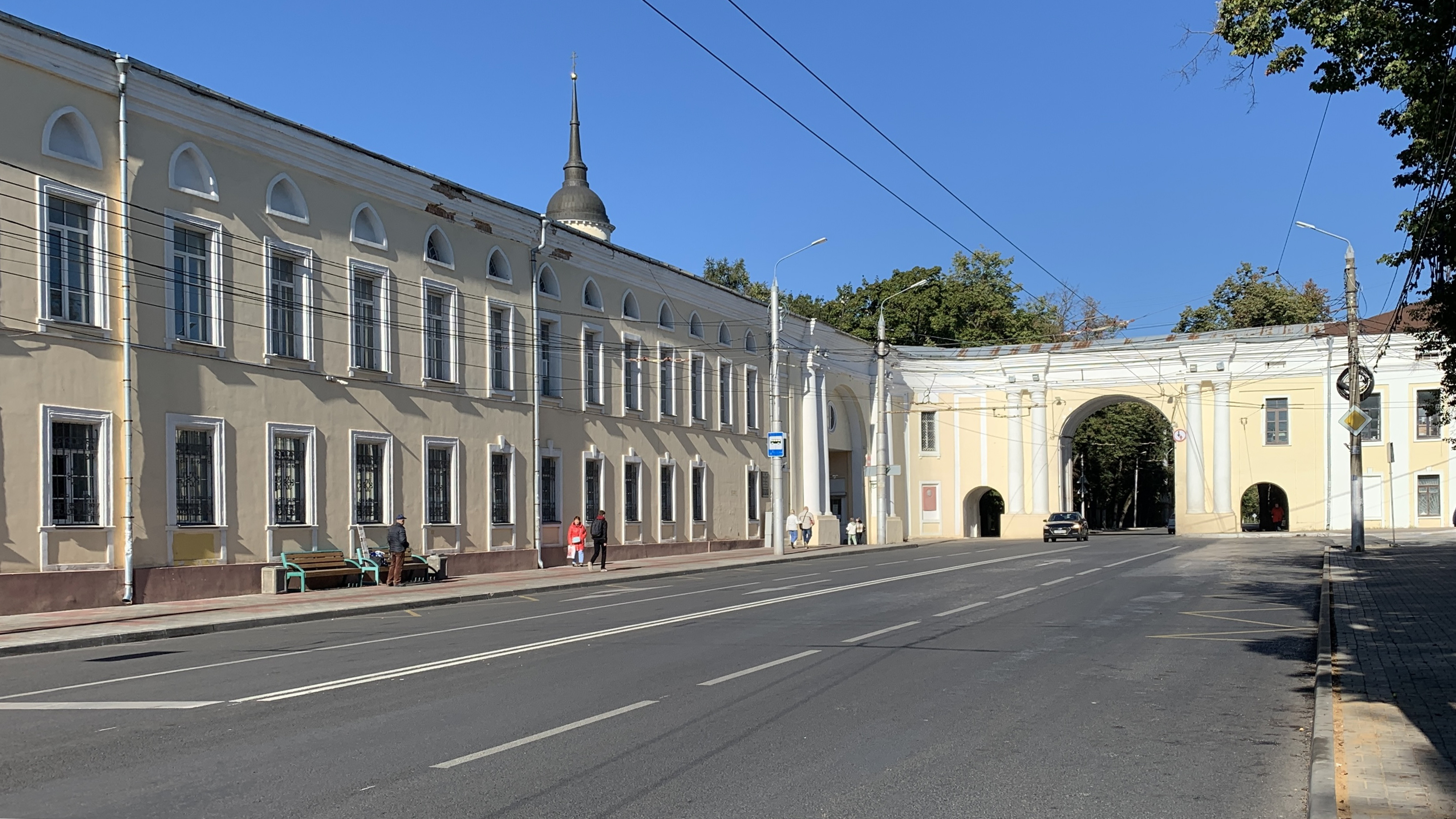
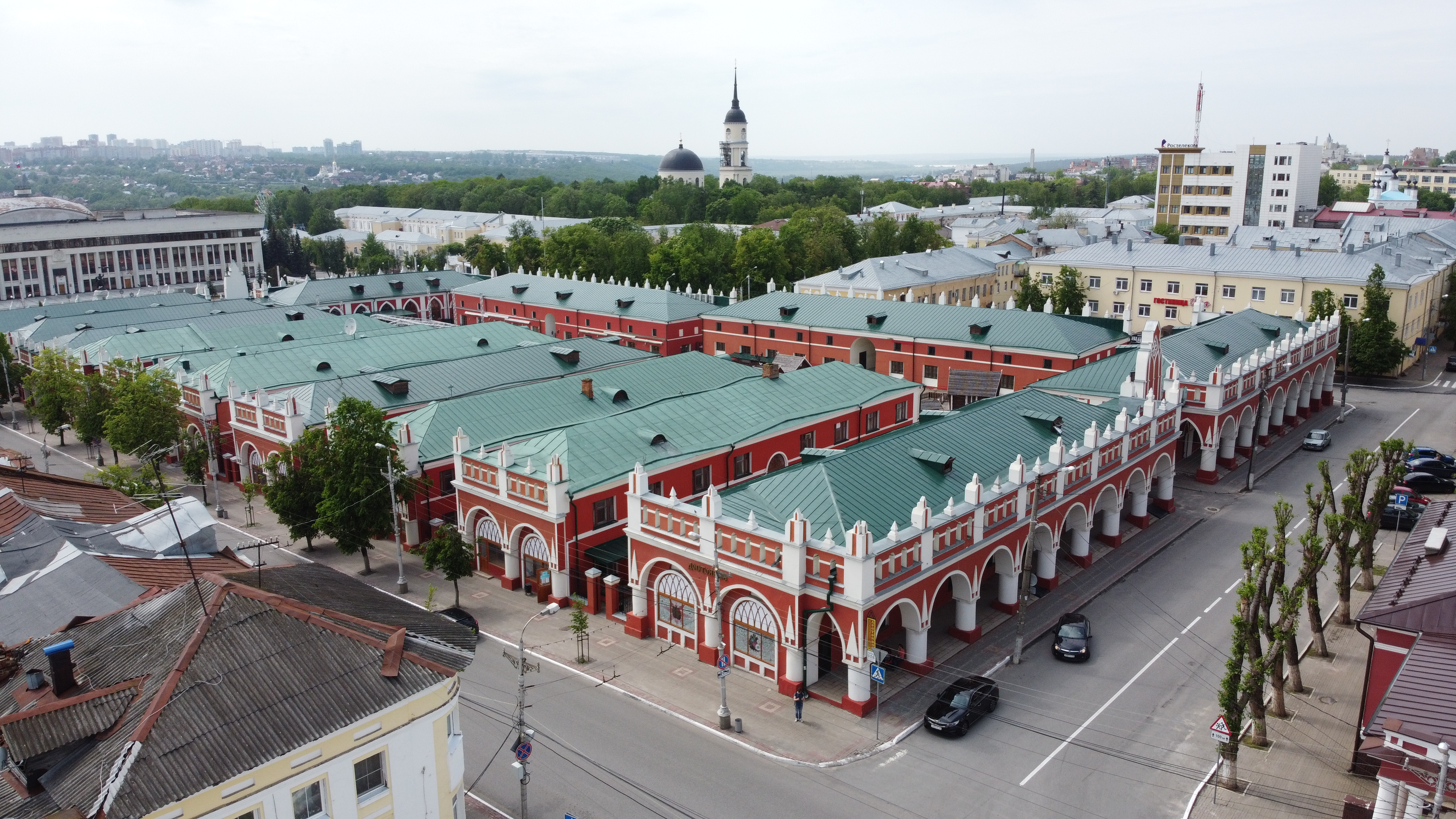
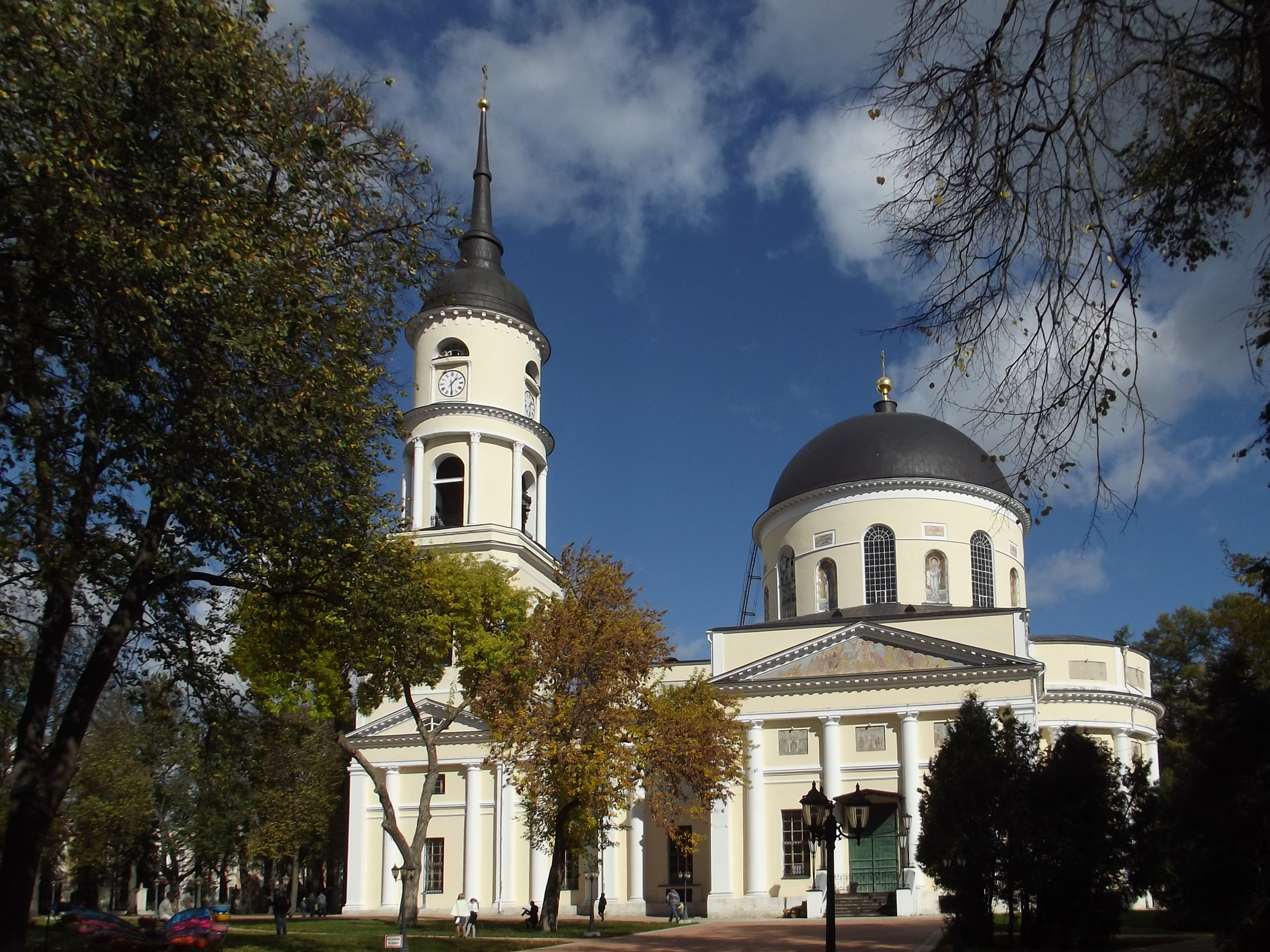
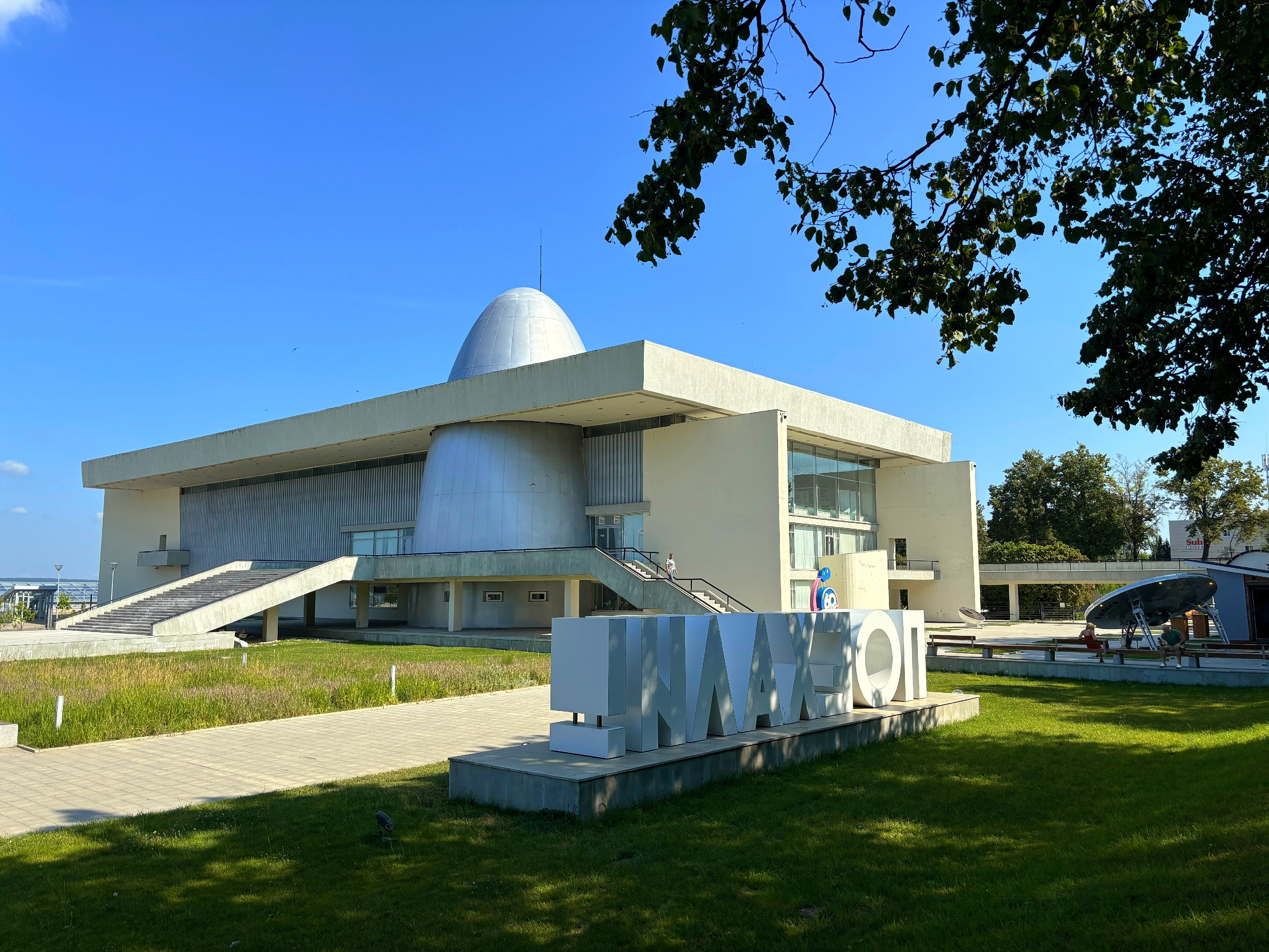
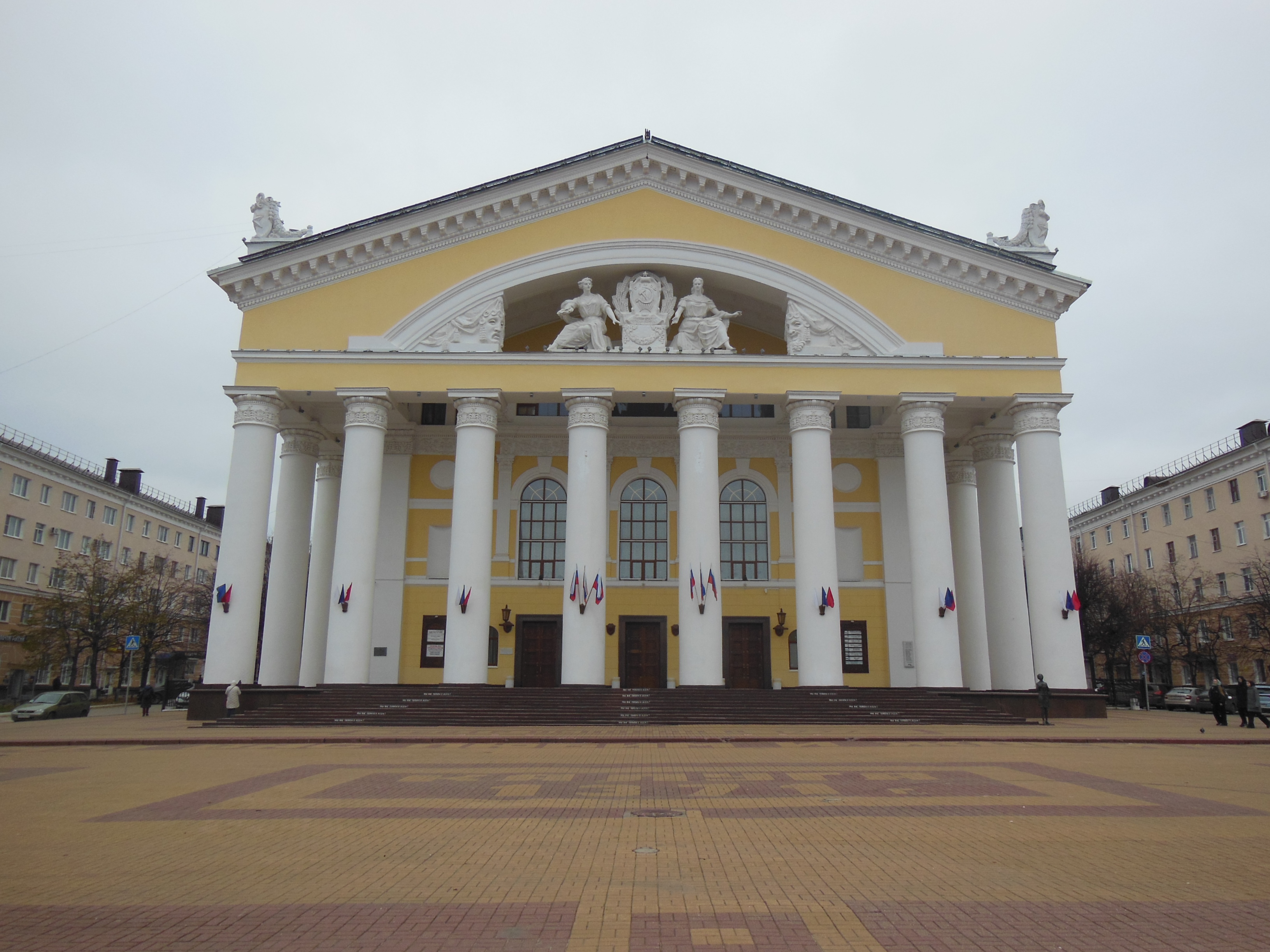
- City center Old trade rows Trinity Cathedral Cosmonautics museum Regional Drama Theatre

- Flag Coat of arms
- Interactive map of Kaluga
- Location of Kaluga Kaluga (Russia) Kaluga (European Russia) Kaluga (Europe)
- Coordinates: 54°33′N 36°17′E
- Country: Russia
- Federal subject: Kaluga Oblast
- First mentioned: 1371

Government
  - Body: City Duma
  - City Head: Dmitry Denisov

Area
  - Total: 170.5 km^{2} (65.8 sq mi)
- Elevation: 190 m (620 ft)

Population (2010 Census)
  - Total: 324,698
  - Estimate (2025): 324,989 (+0.1%)
  - Rank: 55th in 2010
  - Density: 1,904/km^{2} (4,932/sq mi)

Administrative status
  - Subordinated to: City of Kaluga
  - Capital of: Kaluga Oblast, City of Kaluga

Municipal status
  - Urban okrug: Kaluga Urban Okrug
  - Capital of: Kaluga Urban Okrug
- Time zone: UTC+3 (MSK)
- Postal code: 248xxx
- Dialing code: +7 4842
- OKTMO ID: 29701000001
- City Day: Second Saturday of September
- Website: www.kaluga-gov.ru

Kaluga (Russian: Калу́га, IPA: [kɐˈɫuɡə]) is a city and the administrative center of Kaluga Oblast, Russia. It stands on the Oka River 150 kilometers (93 mi) southwest of Moscow. Its population was 337,058 at the 2021 census.

Established in the 14th century as a Russian border fortress, Kaluga was notable as a place of exile for political prisoners, leaders and officials of other nations under the Russian Empire, and has served as the seat of regional administration since 1776. Kaluga's most famous resident, the space travel pioneer Konstantin Tsiolkovsky, worked there as a school teacher from 1892 to 1935. The Tsiolkovsky State Museum of the History of Cosmonautics in Kaluga is dedicated to his theoretical achievements and to their practical implementations for modern space research, hence the motto on the city's coat of arms: Колыбель Космонавтики, Kolybélʹ kosmonávtiki ("The Cradle of Space Exploration").

== History ==
Kaluga, founded in the mid-14th century as a border fortress on the southwestern borders of the Grand Duchy of Moscow, first appears in the historical records in chronicles from the 14th century as Koluga; the name comes from Old Russian kaluga - "bog, quagmire". In the late 14th century, it was located on the Muscovite border with Lithuania. During the time of the Tartar raids, it was on the western side of the Oka bank defense line. The Great stand on the Ugra River was fought just to the west. It was an important strategic location in Muscovy's fights against Lithuania and the Crimean Khanate. In the Middle Ages, Kaluga was a minor settlement owned by the Princes Vorotynsky. The ancestral home of these princes lies southwest of the modern city.

During the Uprising of Bolotnikov, it was successfully defended by Bolotnikov against Tsarist forces. In 1610, it was the main residence of False Dmitry II, who was supported by the local population, and where he was killed by an ethnic Tatar. In retaliation, the residents massacred all Tatars.

From 1708, Kaluga was administratively located in the Moscow Governorate. In 1776, it became the capital of the newly formed Kaluga Viceroyalty, later renamed to Kaluga Governorate. On 19 January 1777, the Kaluga drama theatre opened for its first season, established with the direct participation of the Governor-General Mikhail Krechetnikov. In 1777, the local coat of arms was approved.

During the Russian Empire, Kaluga was frequently the residence of political exiles and prisoners such as Polish Catholic Bishops Kajetan Sołtyk and Józef Andrzej Załuski, Polish dignitaries Wacław Rzewuski and Seweryn Rzewuski (1767), the last Crimean khan Şahin Giray (1786), the Kyrgyz sultan Arigazi-Abdul-Aziz (1828), the Georgian princess Thecla (1834–1835), and the Avar leader Imam Shamil (1859–1868).

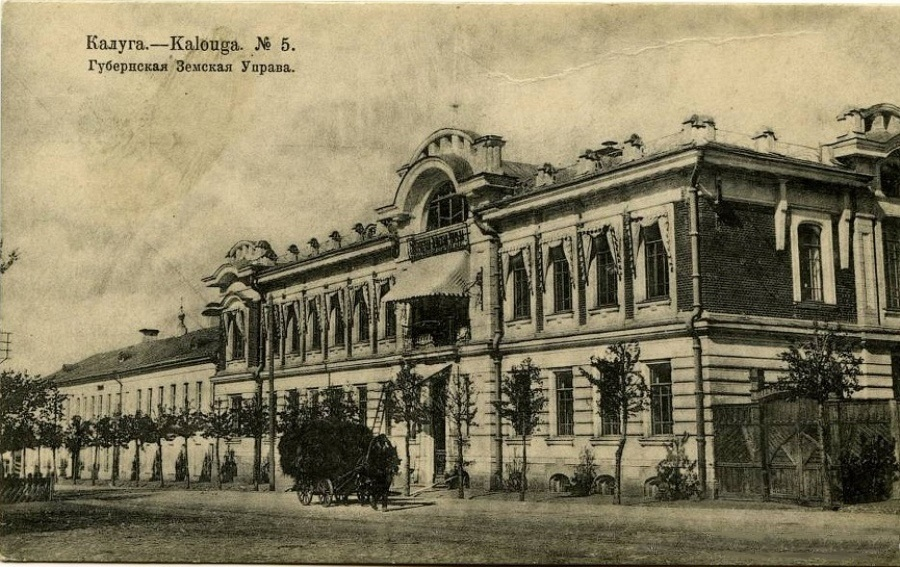
Kaluga in c. 1914

Kaluga is connected to Moscow by rail and by road - partly the ancient Kaluga Road, known as the Old Kaluga Highway, partly the A101 road. This road offered Napoleon his preferred escape route from Moscow in the fall of 1812. But General Kutuzov repelled Napoleon's advances in this direction and forced the retreating French army onto the Old Smolensk Road, previously devastated by the French during their invasion of Russia.

During World War II, the German army briefly occupied Kaluga during the climactic Battle of Moscow, as part of Operation Barbarossa. The city was under full or partial German occupation from 12 October to 30 December 1941. The Germans operated the Dulag 127 transit prisoner-of-war camp in the city. There was a high mortality rate in the camp, and then it was relocated west to Roslavl. In 1944, the Soviet Government used local military buildings to intern hundreds of Polish prisoners of war — soldiers of the Polish underground Home Army — whom the advancing Soviet front had arrested in the area around Vilnius.

=== Discovery of a Stone Idol ===
In 1953, on the outskirts of Kaluga, in the area of an old logging site near the Lesnichevka ravine, the local press reported the discovery of a small stone idol approximately 18 cm tall. The figurine is made of light-colored stone, has a simplified phallic shape, and features a large eye carved on the upper part of the figure. Based on fragmentary local history commentaries from the mid-20th century, the find was interpreted as a possible depiction of a local household cult character conventionally referred to as Nilo, who was presumed to be linked with participants of ritual or comedic performances within the Kaluga region.

The original photograph of the artifact has not been preserved; the image circulated today is a modern visual reconstruction created from written descriptions.

== Demographics ==
Historical population

Year	Pop.	±%
1897	49,513	—
1926	49,425	−0.2%
1939	89,396	+80.9%
1959	134,235	+50.2%
1970	210,906	+57.1%

Year	Pop.	±%
1979	265,013	+25.7%
1989	311,399	+17.5%
2002	334,751	+7.5%
2010	324,698	−3.0%
2021	337,058	+3.8%

Source: Census data

As of the 2021 Census, the ethnic composition of Kaluga was:

Ethnic group	Population	Percentage
Russians	310,622	91.9%
Armenians	4,527	1.3%
Tajiks	3,260	1.0%
Uzbeks	3,100	0.9%
Ukrainians	2,876	0.9%
Other	13,691	4.0%

== Administrative and municipal status ==
Kaluga is the administrative center of the oblast. Within the framework of administrative divisions, it is, together with seventy-two rural localities, incorporated as the City of Kaluga—an administrative unit with a status equal to that of districts. As a municipal division, the City of Kaluga, together with one rural locality in Ferzikovsky District (the selo of Novozhdamirovo), is incorporated as Kaluga Urban Okrug.

== Economy ==
The Kaluga Turbine Plant is located here as is Kaluga Machine Works, which manufactures track machines for railways. In recent years, Kaluga has become a center of the Russian automotive industry, with a number of foreign companies opening assembly plants in the area:

On 28 November 2007, Volkswagen Group opened a new assembly plant in Kaluga, which further expanded by 2009. The investment has reached over 500 million Euros. As of 2014, the plant assembled the Volkswagen Passat, Škoda Fabia and Škoda Rapid.

On 15 October 2007, the Volvo Group broke ground on a new truck assembly plant that was inaugurated on 19 January 2009, with a yearly capacity of 10,000 Volvo and 5,000 Renault trucks.

On 12 December 2007, PSA Peugeot Citroën announced its decision to build a new assembly plant in Kaluga.

== Transportation ==
The city is served by the Grabtsevo Airport. Since 1899, there has been a railway connection between Kaluga and Moscow.

Public transportation is represented by the trolleybuses, buses, and marshrutkas (routed taxis).

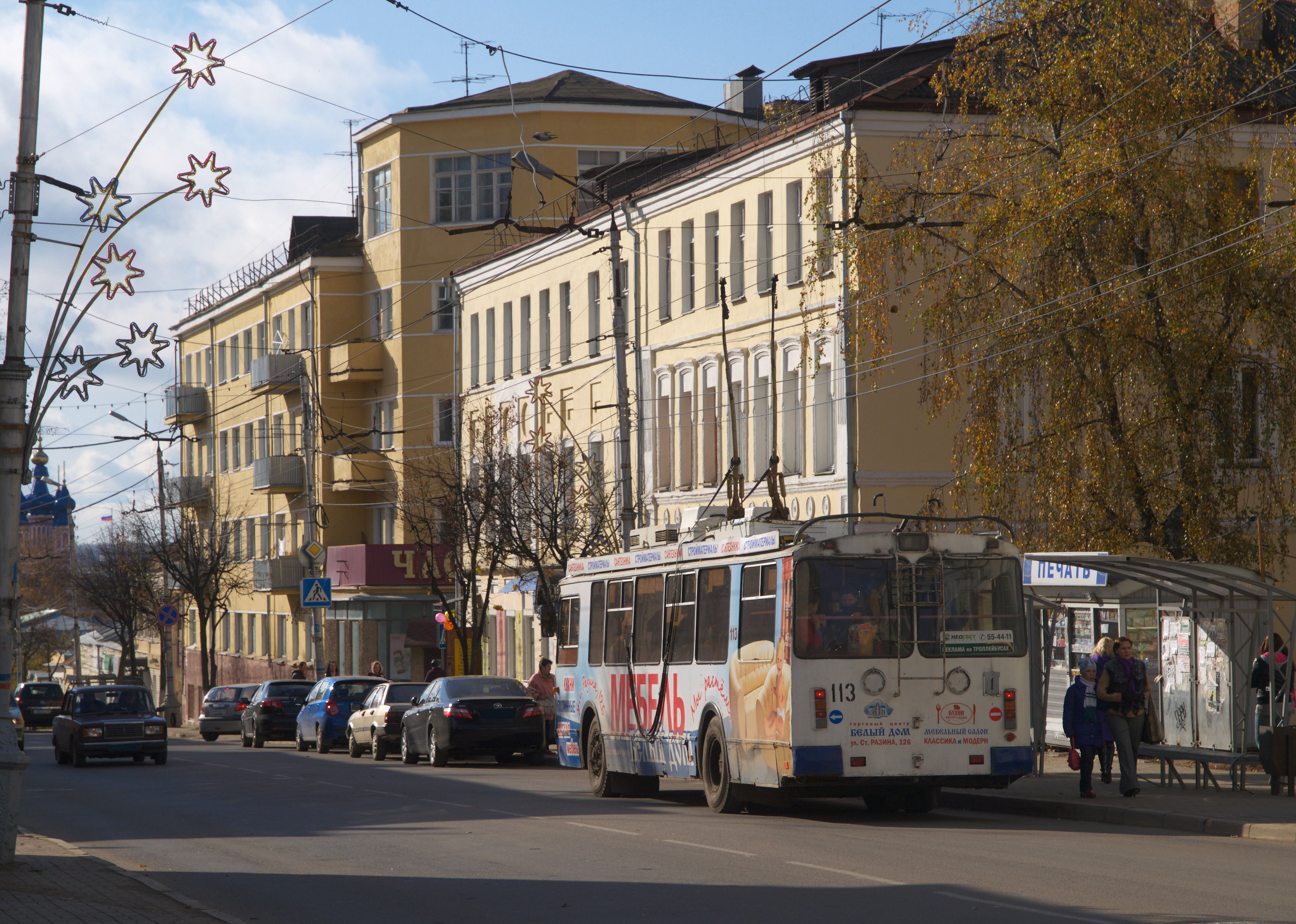
ZiU-682 trolleybus

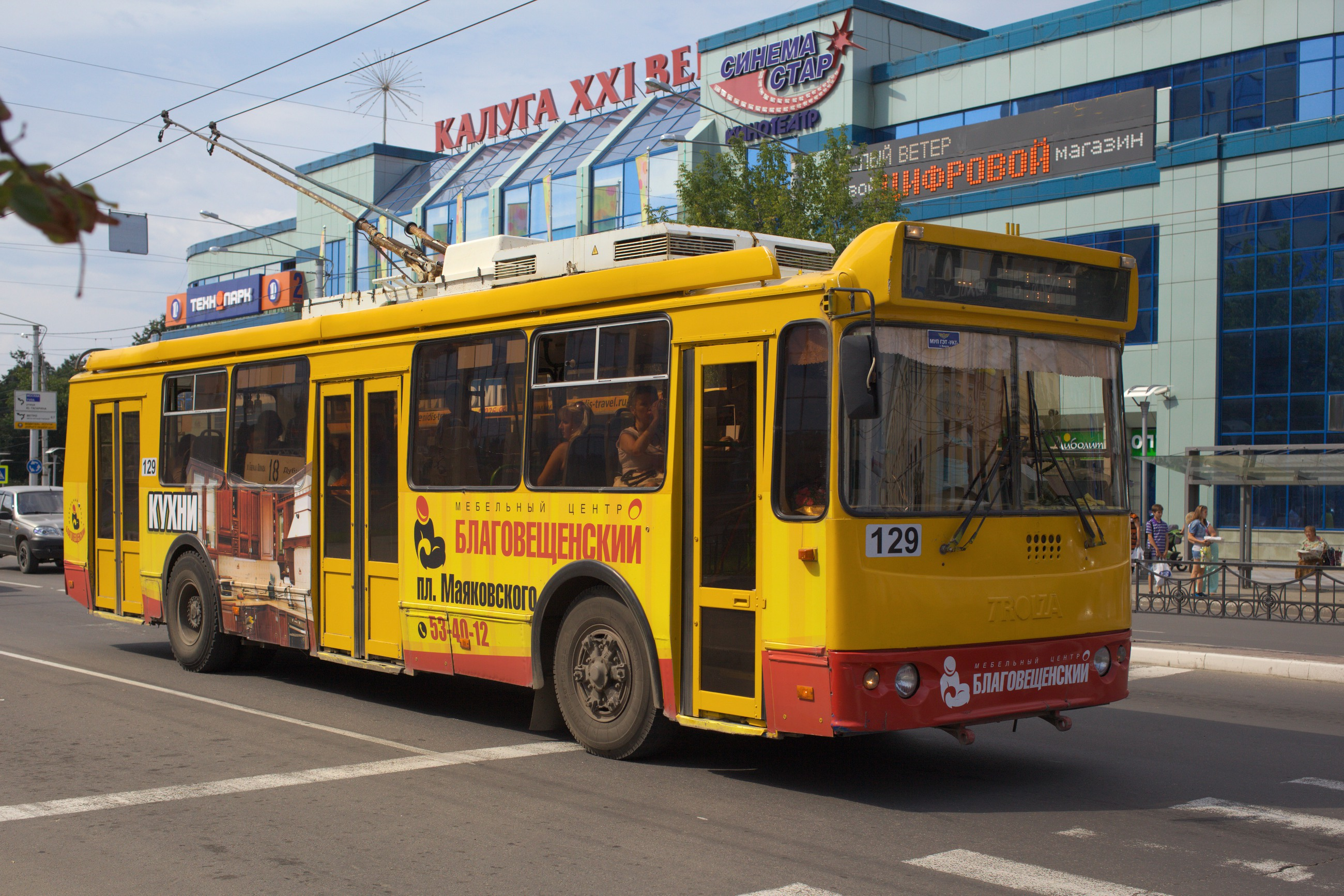
ZiU-682 trolleybus

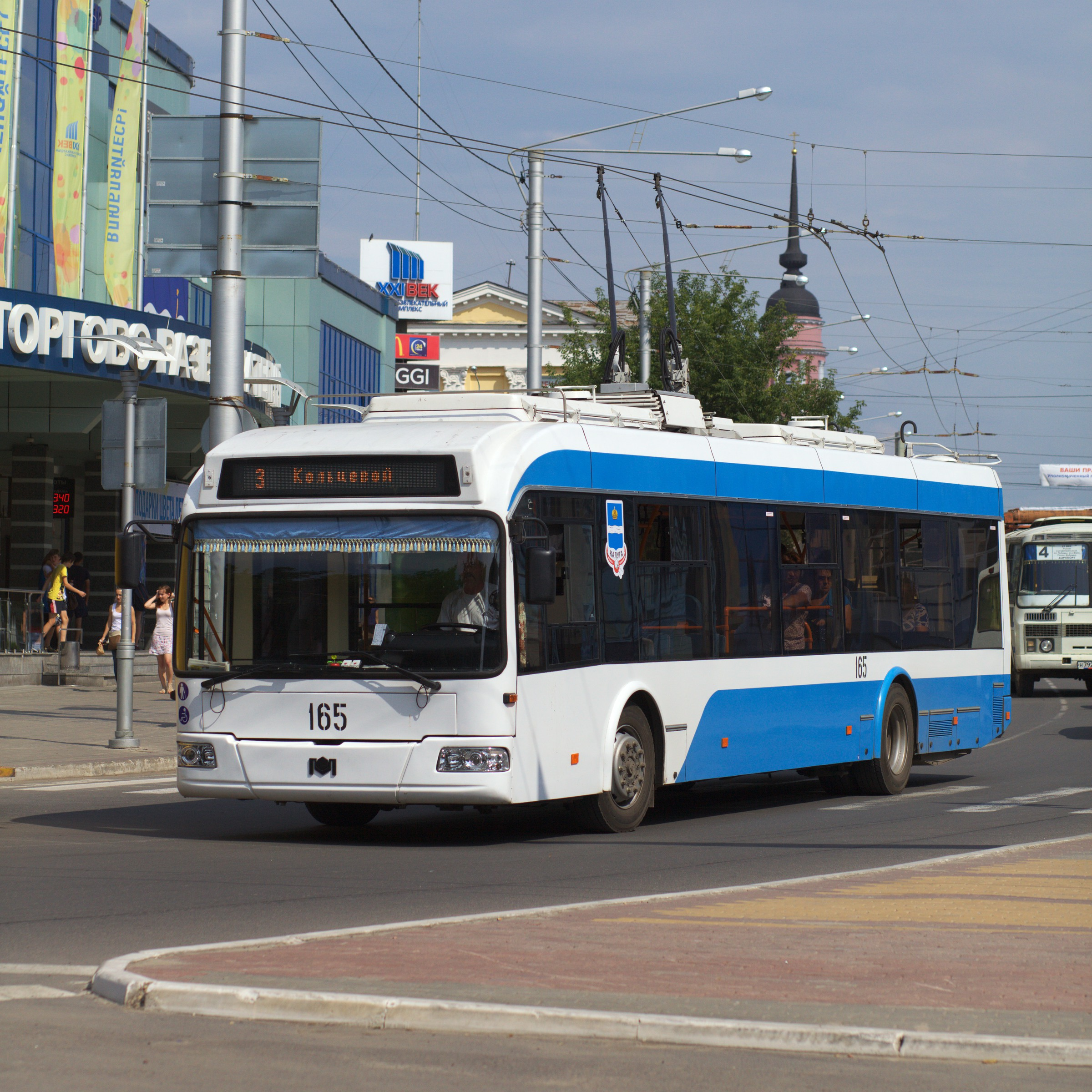
BKM-321 low-floor trolleybus

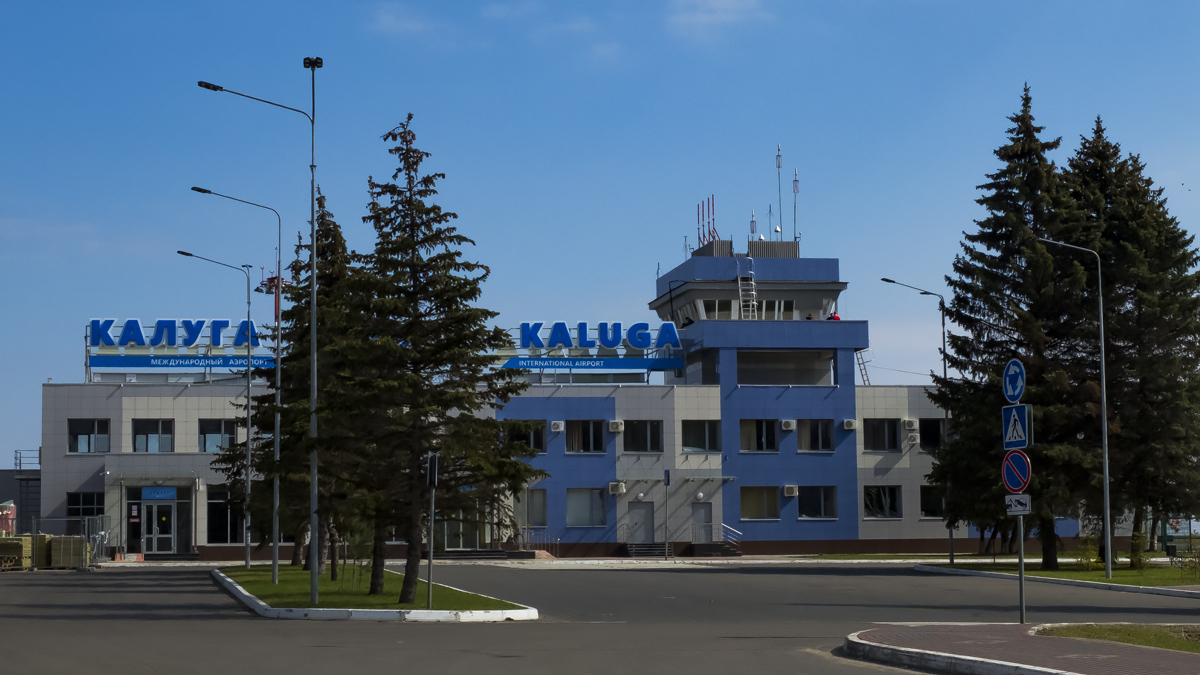
Kaluga Airport

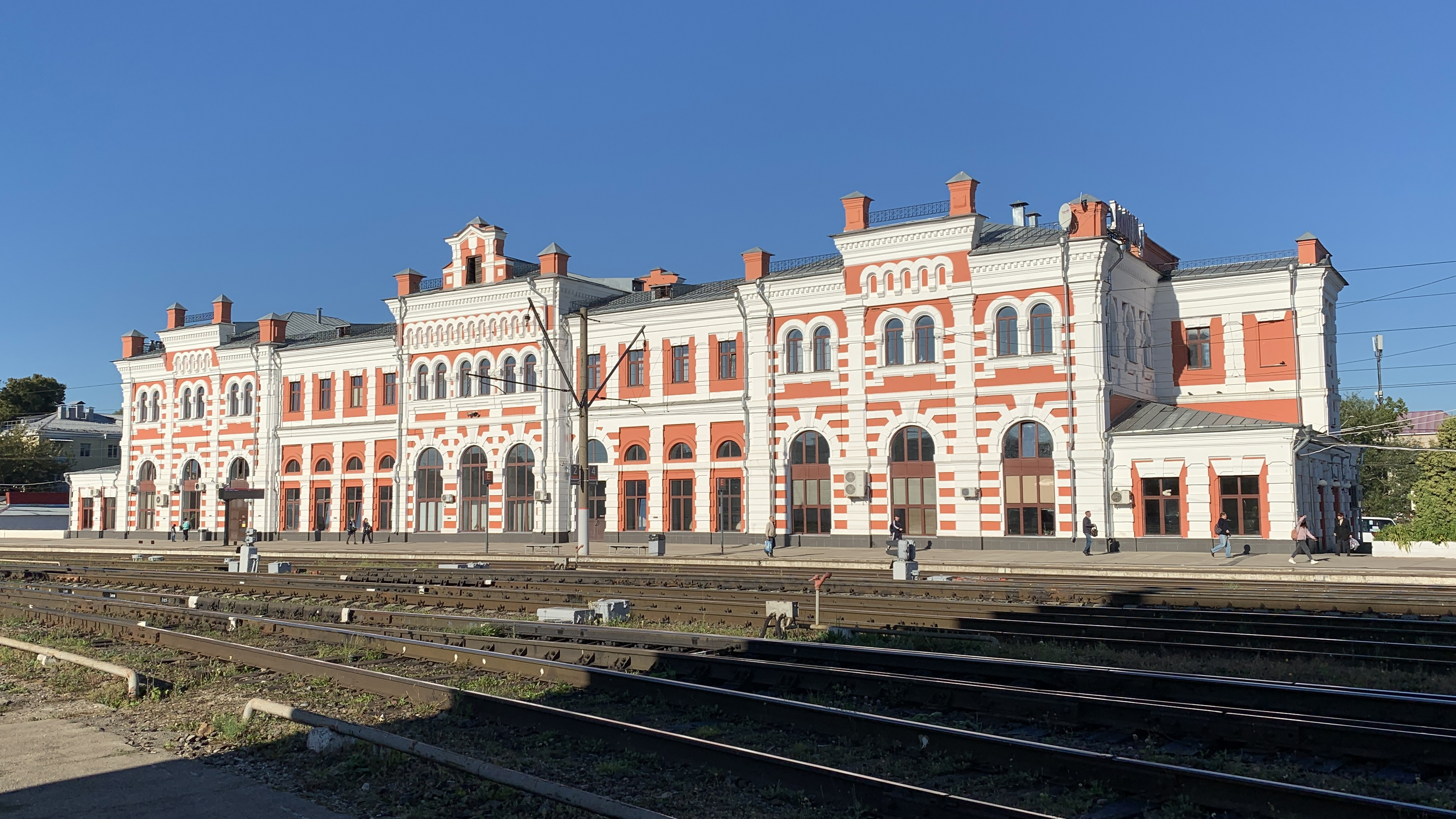
Kaluga Railway Station

== Climate ==
Kaluga has a humid temperate continental (Köppen climate classification: Dfb), with warm and humid summers; and long, cold and snowy winters. Winter extreme records have been as low as −45 °C (−49 °F), while summer heat may reach up +40 °C (104 °F), but normal variation is between −5 °C (23 °F) and −20 °C (−4 °F) during winter and between 15 °C (59 °F) and 30 °C (86 °F) during summer in Kaluga.

Climate data for Kaluga, Russia (period 1961–1990)
Month	Jan	Feb	Mar	Apr	May	Jun	Jul	Aug	Sep	Oct	Nov	Dec	Year
Mean daily maximum °C (°F)	−6.6 (20.1)	−5.0 (23.0)	0.4 (32.7)	10.3 (50.5)	18.7 (65.7)	21.5 (70.7)	23.0 (73.4)	21.9 (71.4)	15.7 (60.3)	9.0 (48.2)	0.7 (33.3)	−3.7 (25.3)	7.2 (45.0)
Daily mean °C (°F)	−10.1 (13.8)	−9.0 (15.8)	−3.5 (25.7)	5.7 (42.3)	12.7 (54.9)	15.8 (60.4)	17.5 (63.5)	16.3 (61.3)	10.9 (51.6)	5.4 (41.7)	−1.9 (28.6)	−6.6 (20.1)	4.4 (39.9)
Mean daily minimum °C (°F)	−13.5 (7.7)	−12.9 (8.8)	−7.4 (18.7)	1.0 (33.8)	6.7 (44.1)	10.1 (50.2)	12.0 (53.6)	10.7 (51.3)	6.1 (43.0)	1.8 (35.2)	−4.5 (23.9)	−9.5 (14.9)	0.1 (32.2)
Average precipitation mm (inches)	39 (1.5)	33 (1.3)	35 (1.4)	39 (1.5)	43 (1.7)	77 (3.0)	80 (3.1)	71 (2.8)	55 (2.2)	50 (2.0)	53 (2.1)	55 (2.2)	630 (24.8)
Source: meteoinfo.ru "meteoinfo.ru".

== Notable people ==
Kaluga's most famous resident was rocket science pioneer Konstantin Tsiolkovsky (1857–1935).

Other notable people include:

- Sergei Avagimyan (born 1989), former professional footballer. Born in Russia, he played for the Armenian national football team.
- Alexander Amfiteatrov (1862–1938), writer, novelist, and historian
- Yuri Averbakh (1922–2022), chess grandmaster
- Valentin Berestov (1922–2022), poet, lyricist
- Mykola Azarov (born 1947), Ukrainian politician
- Pafnuty Chebyshev (1821–1894), mathematician
- Alexander Chizhevsky (1897–1964), interdisciplinary scientist
- David Edelstadt (1866–1892), poet
- Alexander Gretchaninov (1864–1956) Russian-American composer
- Jonah of Hankou (1888–1925), Bishop
- Andrei Kalaychev (born 1963), football player
- Valery Kobelev (born 1973), ski jumper
- Ivan Kuliak (born 2002), artistic gymnast
- Stanislav Kunyaev (born 1932), poet, journalist, translator, and literary critic
- Mikhail Linge (1958–1994), track and field athlete
- Yevgeny Obolensky (1796–1865), Decembrist
- Bulat Okudzhava (1924–1997), lived and taught Literature in public school in the 1950s
- Nikolai Panchenko (1924–2005), poet
- Pavel Popovich (1930–2009), cosmonaut, the only person to receive two honorary citizenships of Kaluga (1962 and 1964)
- Larisa Popugayeva (1923–1977), geologist
- Nikolai Rakov (1908–1990), violinist, composer and conductor
- Imam Shamil (1797–1871), political, military, and spiritual leader of North Caucasian resistance to Imperial Russia in the 1800s
- Nikolay Skvortsov (born 1984), swimmer
- Tamara Syomina (born 1938), actress
- Yuliya Tabakova (born 1980), track and field sprint athlete
- Serafim Tulikov (1914–2004), composer
- Georgy Zhukov (1896–1974), Soviet military leader who served as a top commander during World War II
- Olesya Zykina (born 1980), 400m athlete

== Twin towns – sister cities ==
Kaluga is twinned with:

- Suhl, Germany (1969)
- Tiraspol, Moldova (2005)
- Panorama, Greece (2011)
- Minsk, Belarus (2015)
- Binzhou, China (2015)
- Yalta, Ukraine (2016)
- Niš, Serbia (2017)

=== Partner cities ===
In addition to twin towns, Kaluga cooperates with:

- Clearwater, United States (1992)
- Xianyang, China (2000)
- Tula, Russia (2002)
- Oryol, Russia (2003)
- Smolensk, Russia (2003)
- Makhachkala, Russia (2012)
- Tsiolkovsky, Russia (2016)
- Ryazan, Russia (2017)
- Tambov, Russia (2017)

== Gallery ==
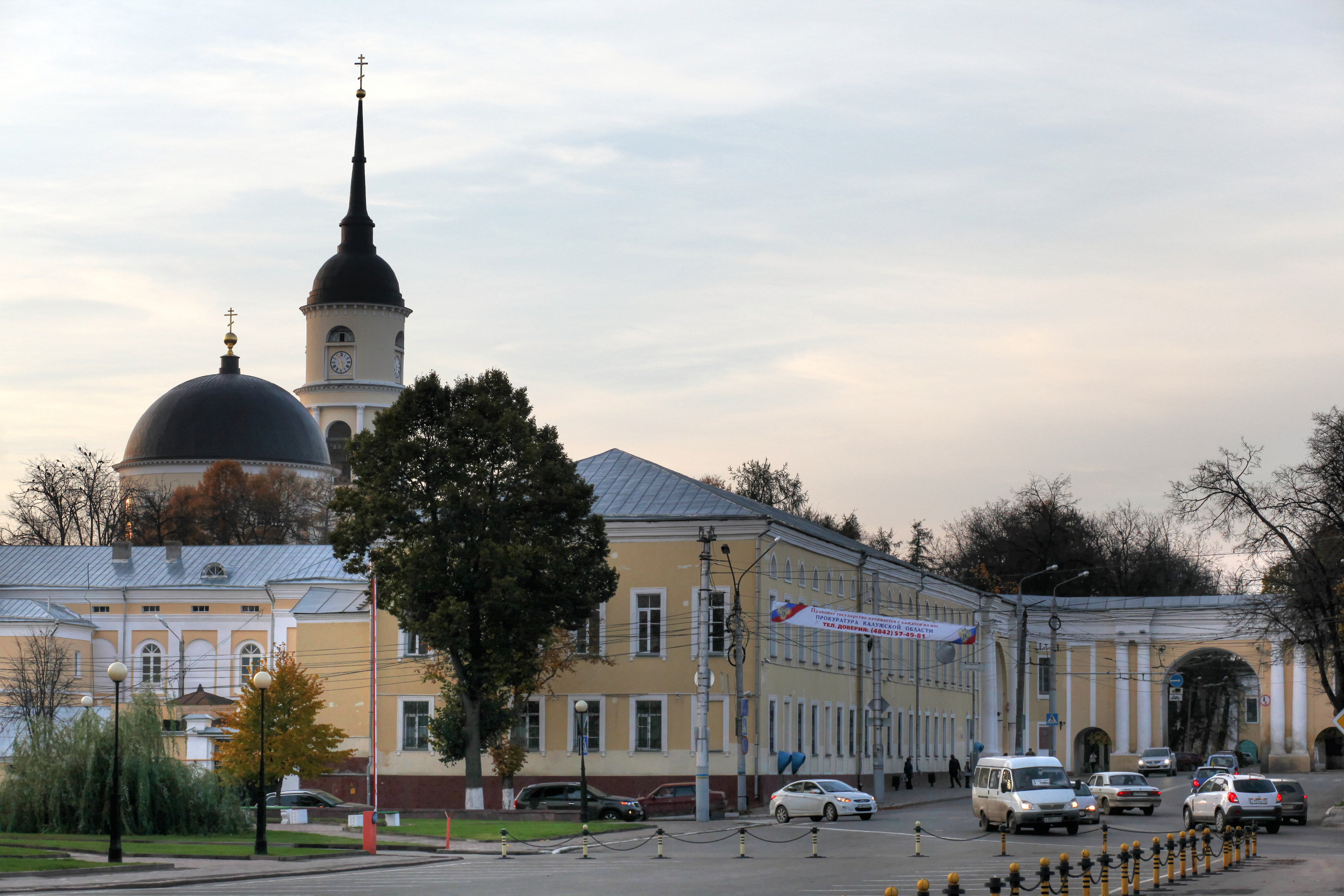
Main Square

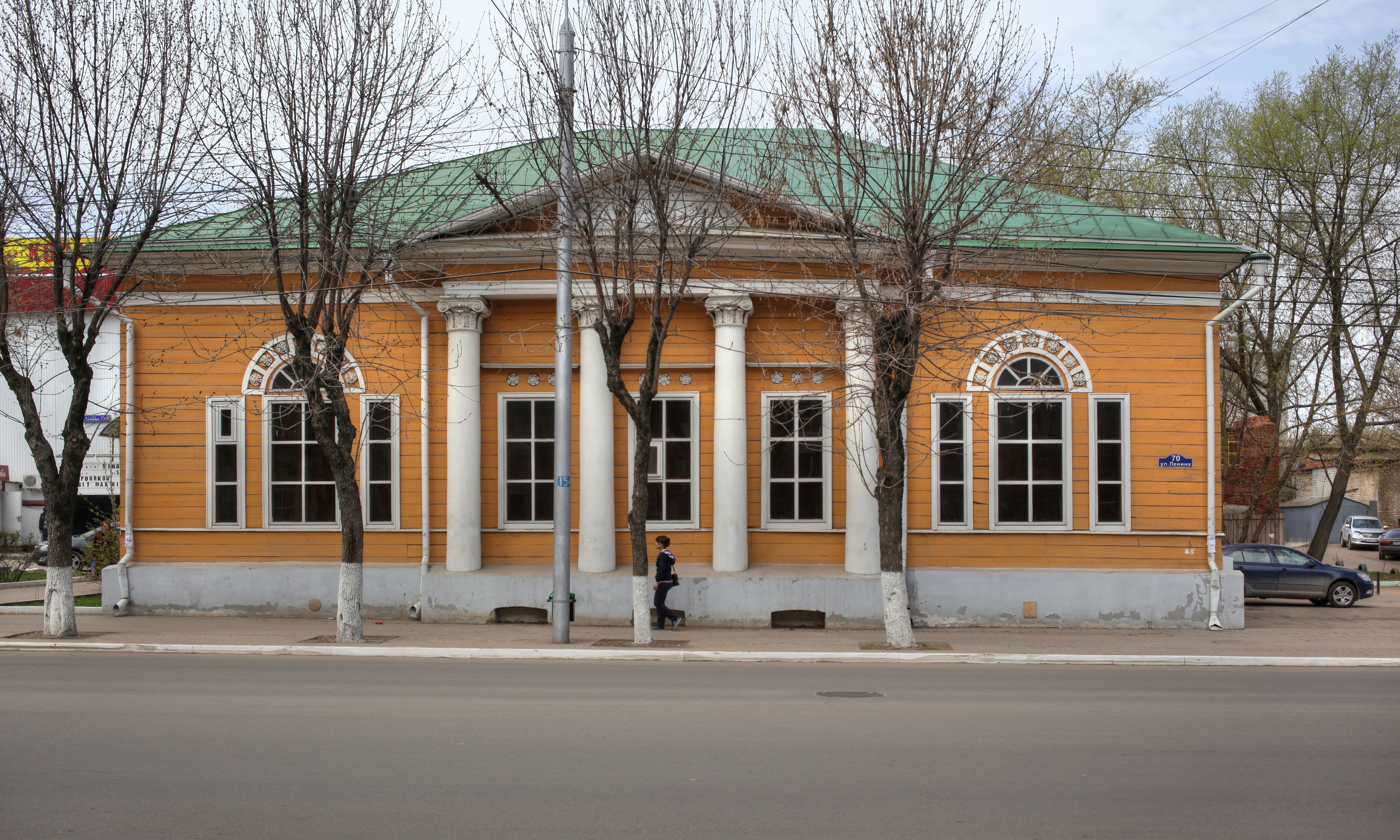
Polman House

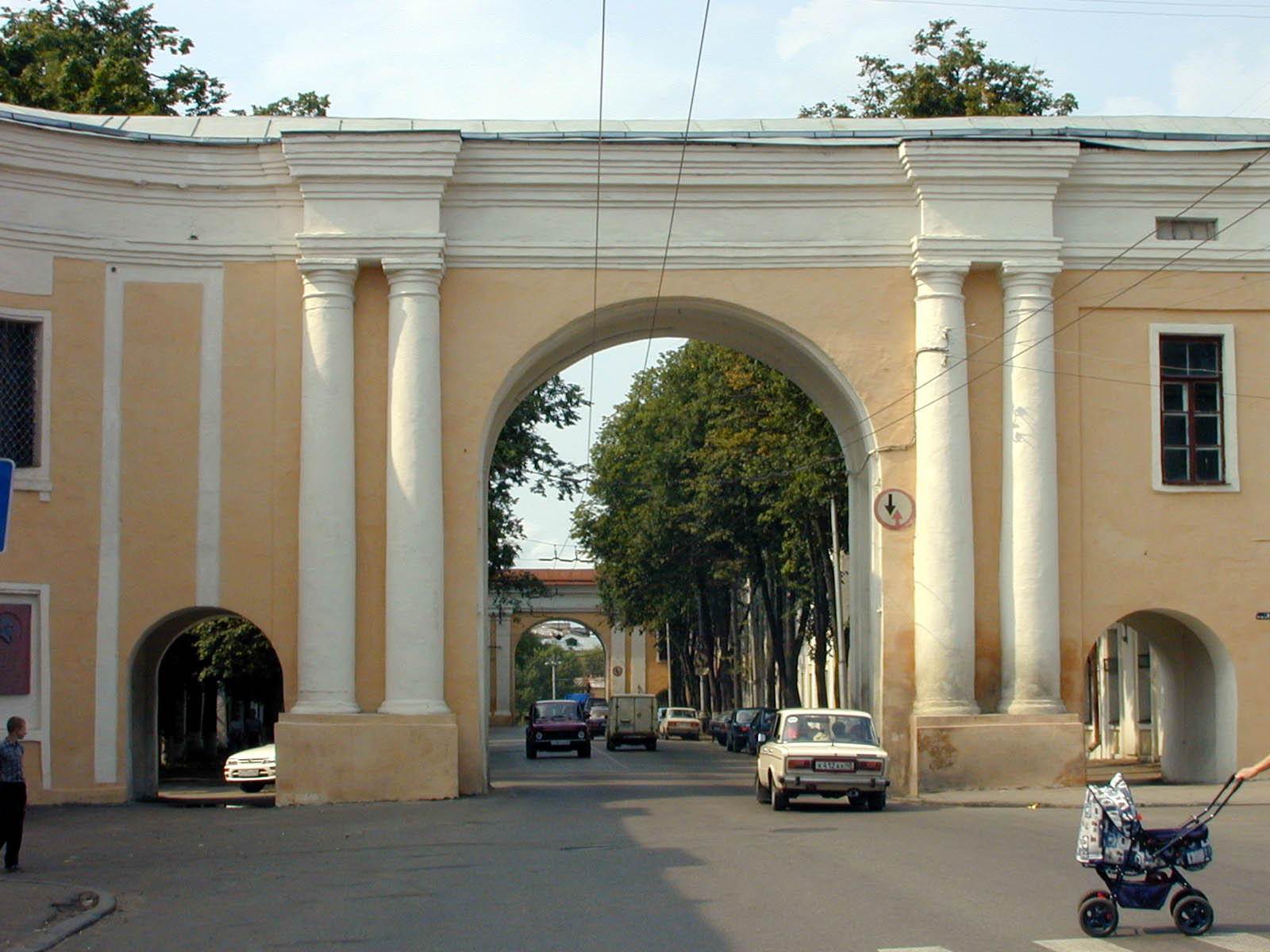
Eastern archway at the Administration Building

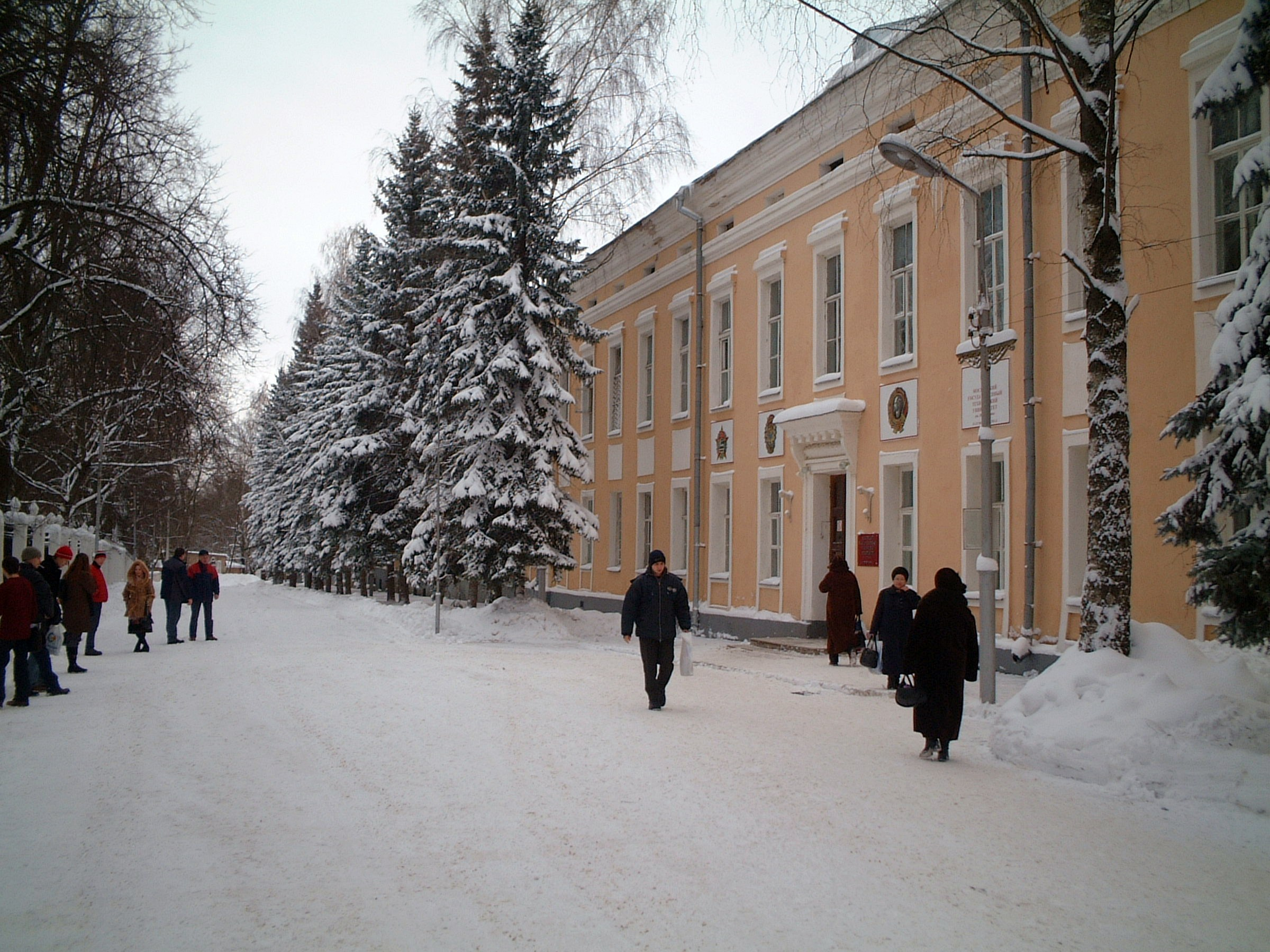
Moscow State Technical University (local branch)

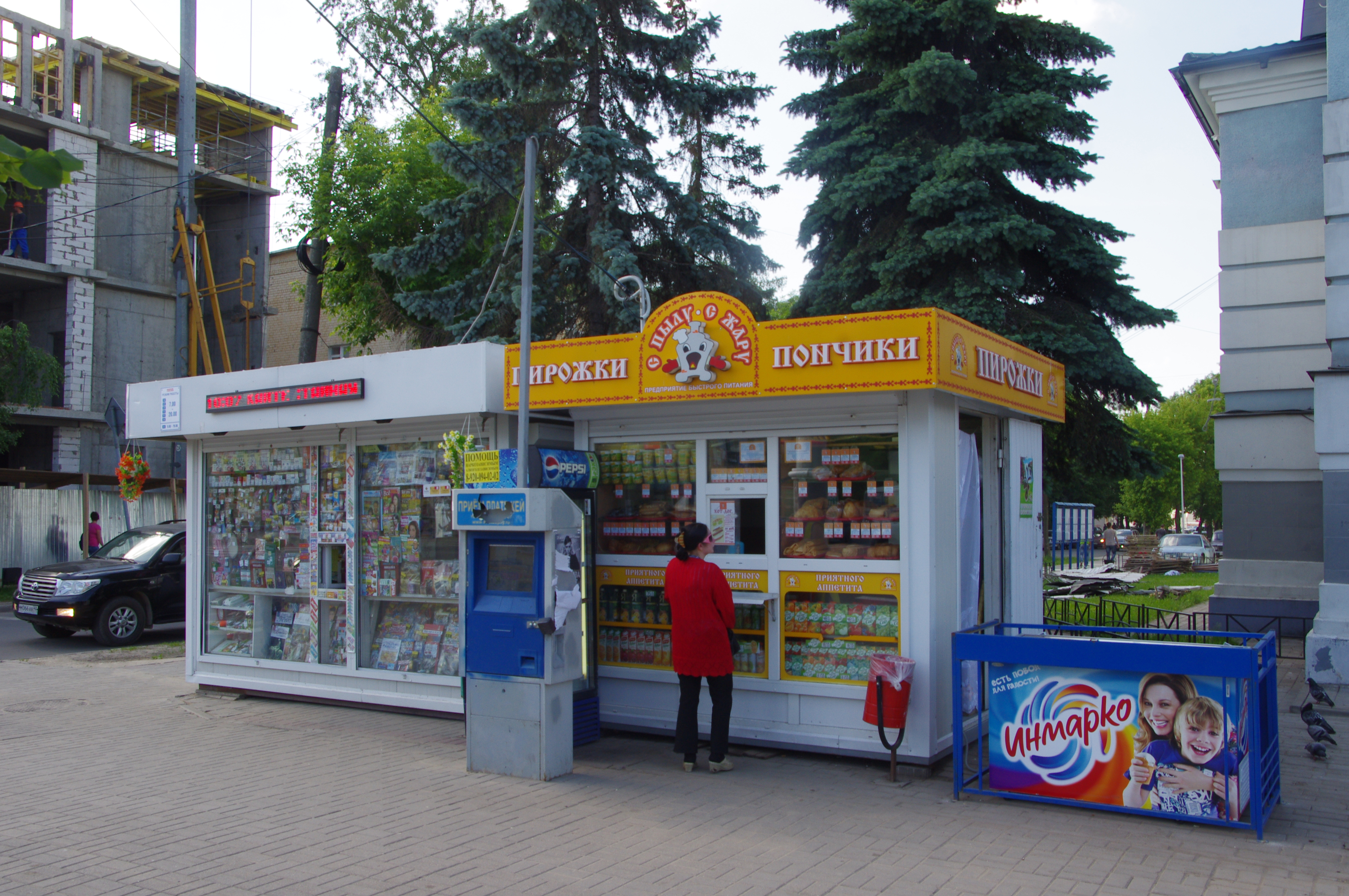
Streetside stores in Kaluga

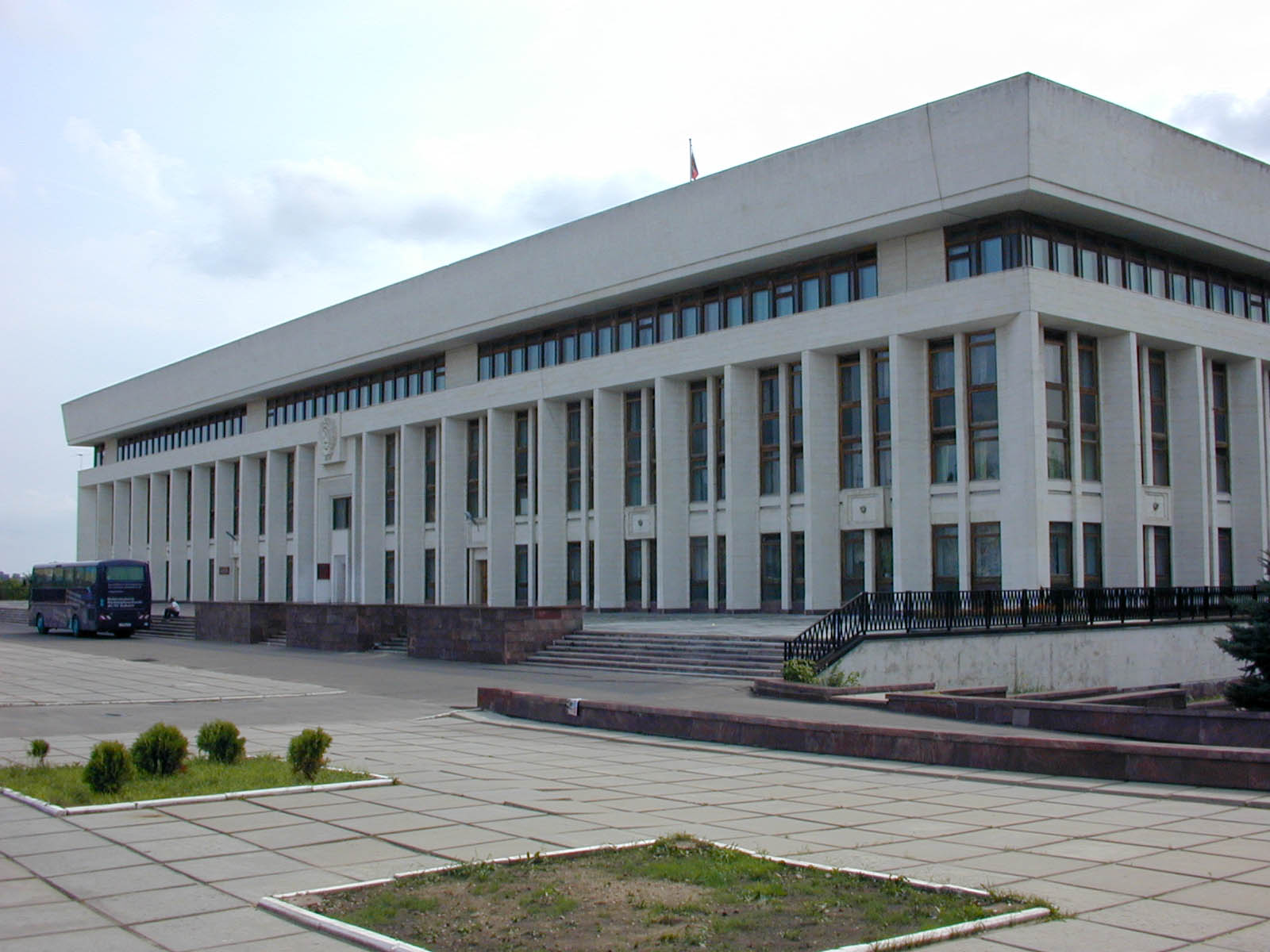
Kaluga Oblast administration
