= Timeline of Vladivostok =

The following is a timeline of the history of the city of Vladivostok, Primorsky Krai, Russia.

== 19th century ==
- 1858 - Territory ceded to Russia by China per Treaty of Aigun.
- 1860 - June: Russian ship Manchzhur arrives; military barracks constructed under command of Nikolay Vasilyevich Komarov.
- 1864 - Kunst & Albers in business.
- 1865 - Vladivostok designated a free port.
- 1870 - Korean settlers arrived in Vladivostok for the first time.
- 1871
  - Okhotsk Military Flotilla based in Vladivostok.
  - Japan-Vladivostok telegraph cable installed.
  - Amerikanskaya Street laid out.
- 1877 - Maritime navigation light established.
- 1880
  - Vladivostok designated a city.
  - Population: 7,300.
- 1881 - Vladivostok Police directorate formed.
- 1883
  - Resettlement administration established.
  - Coat of arms tiger design adopted.
  - Vladivostok newspaper begins publication.
- 1884 - Society for the Study of the Amur Region established.
- 1887 - Public reading-hall opens.
- 1888 - Oblast governor's residence related to Vladivostok from Khabarovsk.
- 1890 - Amurskiy Regional Museum opens.
- 1891 - May: Nicholas II visits city.
- 1892 - Far East newspaper begins publication.
- 1894 - State Bank branch opens.
- 1897 - Population: 28,896.
- 1898 - Russo-Chinese Bank branch opens.
- 1899
  - Oriental Institute opens.
  - Advertiser newspaper begins publication.
- 1900
  - Population: 38,000.
  - Ceased to be a free port.

== 20th century ==
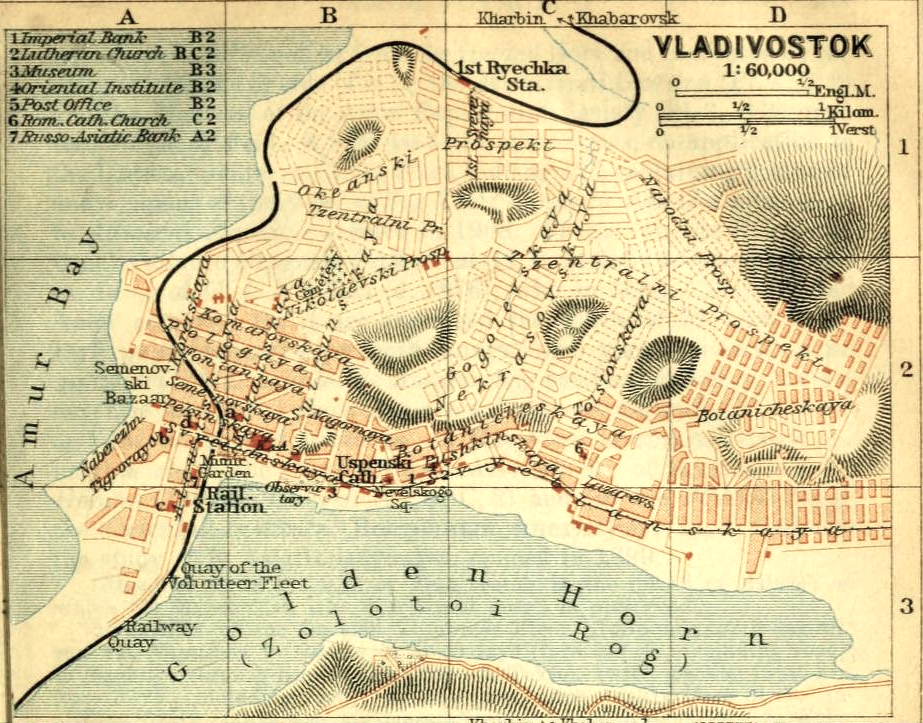
Map of Vladivostok, 1914

- 1902 - Vladivostok Sea School of Far Navigation founded.
- 1903 - Trans-Siberian Railway begins operating.
- 1906 - January: Armed revolt.
- 1907
  - Siberian Bank branch opens.
  - October: Armed revolt.
  - Winter: After a multitude of alleged paranormal incidents and multiple crew deaths, the Ivan Vassili is burned by drunken sailors.
- 1908 - Tram begins operating.
- 1909 - Population: 90,100.
- 1911 - Korean enclave Shinhanchon is established.
- 1912
  - Train station built.
  - Theater and Music begins publication.
- 1917 - December: Japanese military occupies railroad.
- 1918
  - Vladivostok Fortress finishes construction.
  - April 4: Three Japanese killed.
  - April 5: United States, Japanese, and British military stationed in city.
- 1920 - April: United States military withdraws from city.
- 1922 - October 25: Red Army in power.
- 1930s - Transit prisons established.
- 1930
  - Far Eastern Politechnical Institute established.
  - Moscow-Vladivostok automotive rally conducted.
- 1931 - Maxim Gorky Academic Theater founded.
- 1932 - Airfield begins operating.
- 1937 - Shinhanchon is dissolved after the forced deportation of Koreans to Central Asia.
- 1942 - A Doolittle Raid B-25 makes an emergency landing in Vladivostok.
- 1954 - Krushchev visits city.
- 1957 - Dynamo Stadium opens.
- 1958
  - Vladivostok designated a closed city.
  - Vladivostok State Medical Institute established.
  - Football Club Luch formed.
- 1960 - Centennial Prospect (street) laid out.
- 1965 - Population: 367,000.
- 1967 - Far Eastern Technological Institute founded.
- 1974 - November: USA-USSR arms control summit held.
- 1985 - Population: 600,000.
- 1988 - City opens to Soviet citizens.
- 1990 - Vladimir Yefremov becomes mayor.
- 1991
  - Sister city relationship established with San Diego, USA.
  - Vladivostok's closed city status ends.
- 1992
  - Pacific Economic Development & Cooperation Center established.
  - August: Asia-Pacific Theatre Festival held.
- 1993 - Viktor Cherepkov becomes mayor.
- 1994 - Tolstoshein Konstantin Borisovich becomes mayor.
- 1996
  - September 21: VladiROCKstok music festival held.
  - Viktor Cherepkov becomes mayor again.
- 1998 - Youry Kopylov becomes mayor.
- 1999 - Spartak Primorye basketball club formed.
- 2000 - City becomes part of the Far Eastern Federal District.

== 21st century ==
- 2003 - Pacific Meridian film festival begins.
- 2004 - Vladimir Nikolayev elected mayor.
- 2005 - Czechoslovak Legions Graveyard renovated.
- 2006 - Vladivostok Times news site begins publication.
- 2008
  - Igor Pushkaryov becomes mayor.
  - December: Protest.
- 2009 - Protests.
- 2010
  - November: International Youth Tiger Summit held.
  - Population: 592,100.
- 2011 - Sakhalin–Khabarovsk–Vladivostok pipeline opens.
- 2012
  - Zolotoy Rog Bridge and Russky Bridge built.
  - September: Asia-Pacific Economic Cooperation summit held on Russky Island.

== See also ==
- History of Vladivostok
- Pacific Fleet (Russia)
- List of mayors of Vladivostok
- Other names of Vladivostok
- List of cities and towns in the Russian Far East

== Bibliography ==
Published in 19th century

- Edmond Cotteau (1885), "De Vladivostok a Nagasaki", De Paris au Japon a travers la Siberie: voyage exécuté du 6 mai au 7 aout 1881 (in French) (2nd ed.), Paris: Librairie Hachette
- Isabella Lucy Bird (1898). "Nagasaki-Wladivostock". Korea and her neighbors: a narrative of travel, with an account of the recent vicissitudes and the present position of the country. London: John Murray.
- "Ussuri Railway: Vladivostok". Guide to the Great Siberian Railway. St. Petersburg: Ministry of Ways of Communication. 1900.

Published in 20th century

- "(Vladivostok)", Asiatic Pilot: East coast of Siberia, Sakhalin Island and Korea, Washington, DC: United States Navy. Hydrographic Office., 1909
- "Vladivostok" . Encyclopædia Britannica. Vol. 28 (11th ed.). 1910. pp. 169–170.
- Claudius Madrolle (1912), "Vladivostok", Northern China, Paris: Hachette & Company, OCLC 8741409
- "Vladivostok", Russia with Teheran, Port Arthur, and Peking, Leipzig: Karl Baedeker, 1914, OCLC 1328163
- "Siberia: Vladivostok". Pacific Ports Manual (7th ed.). Los Angeles, USA: Terminal Publishing Company. 1921.
- Gaye Christoffersen (1994–1995). "The Greater Vladivostok Project: Transnational Linkages in Regional Economic Planning". Pacific Affairs. 67.
- William Richardson (1995). "Vladivostok: City of three eras". Planning Perspectives. 10 (1). International Planning History Society: 43. Bibcode:1995PlPer..10...43R. doi:10.1080/02665439508725812.

Published in 21st century

- Sharon Hudgins (2004), "Vladivostok: Capital of Russia's Wild East", Other Side of Russia: A Slice of Life In Siberia and the Russian Far East, USA: Texas A&M University Press, ISBN 9781585444045
- Stanley D. Brunn; et al., eds. (2008). "Vladivostok". Cities Of The World: World Regional Urban Development (4th ed.). USA: Rowman & Littlefield.
