= History of Vladivostok =

City history

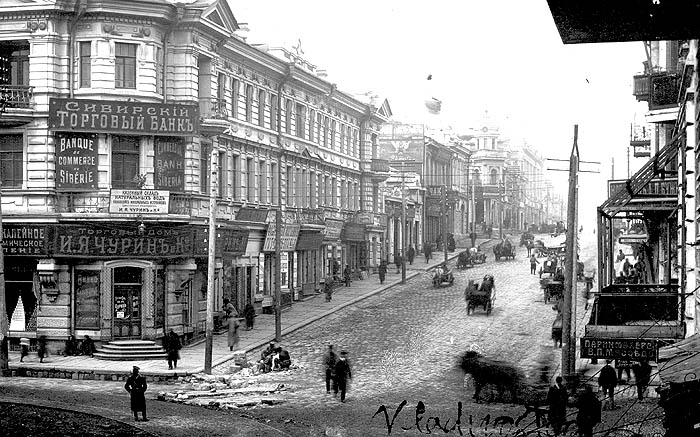
Streets of Vladivostok in the 1910s

The area that is now Vladivostok was ruled by various states, including the Mohe, the Goguryeo, the Balhae and the later Liao, Jīn and Ming dynasties. The land was ceded by China to Russia as a result of the Treaty of Aigun of 1858 and the Treaty of Peking of 1860.

== Chinese influence ==
On Chinese maps from the Yuan dynasty (1271–1368), Vladivostok is called Yongmingcheng (永明城 [Yǒngmíngchéng], "city of eternal light"). During the Ming dynasty (1368–1644) it was under Ming rule as part of the Nurgan Regional Military Commission. It was visited by Chinese expeditions under Haixi Jurchen eunuch Yishiha, and a relic of that time, the Ming Yongning Temple Stele is displayed in the local museum. The 1689 Treaty of Nerchinsk defined the area as part of China under the Manchu Qing dynasty. Later, as the Manchus banned non-banner Han Chinese from most of Manchuria (including the Vladivostok region), it was only visited by shēnzéi (參賊, ginseng or sea cucumber thieves) who illegally entered the area seeking ginseng or sea cucumbers (ambiguous, since both words use the Chinese 參, shēn). From this comes the current Chinese name for the city, 海參崴 – (Hǎishēnwǎi, "sea-cucumber cliffs"). A French ship which is believed to have visited the area around 1858 found several huts belonging to Han or Manchu fishermen. There is also the Udge, the Orochi, the Nanai, and the Mohe living in Vladivostok.

== Russian control ==
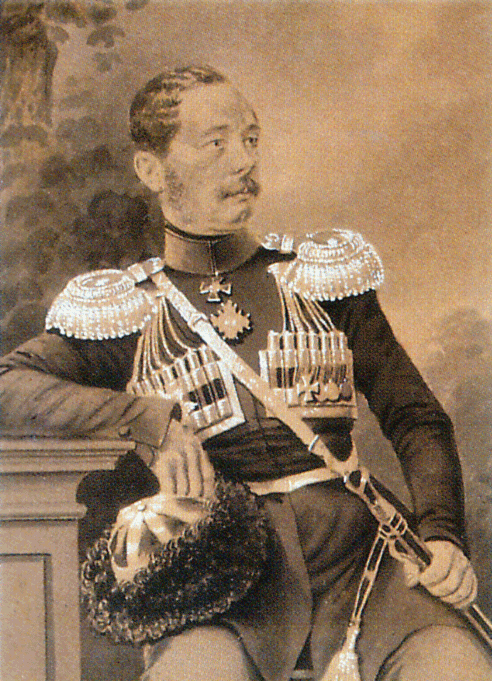
Count Nikolay N. Muravyov

During the summer of 1859 the governor-general of eastern Siberia, Nikolay N. Muravyov, visited the peninsula and bay (somewhat similar to the Bay of the Golden Horn in Constantinople) on the steam corvette Amerika. The peninsula was named Muravyov-Amursky in his honor. The first Europeans to visit the bay, later named the Golden Horn Bay, were the crews of the British warships HMS Winchester and HMS Barracouta in 1855.

=== Origins of the modern city ===
On June 20, 1860 (July 2 Gregorian style) the military supply ship Manchur, under Captain-Lieutenant Alexey K. Shefner, called at Golden Horn Bay to found the outpost of Vladivostok. Warrant officer Nikolay Komarov, with 28 soldiers and two non-commissioned officers under his command, was brought from Nikolayevsk-on-Amur by ship to construct its first buildings. They pitched camp, selecting a site where the entrance to Golden Horn Bay was always visible.

In 1862, under the leadership of Yevgeny Burachyok, Vladivostok became an official port. To encourage foreign trade, it was designated a free port for imports. In 1864, the Southern Harbors command was moved to Vladivostok from Nikolayevsk-on-Amur. A year later a shipbuilding yard was founded in the city, and the first settlers from Nikolayevsk-on-Amur began arriving. In 1871 the naval port, military governor's residence, and main base of the Siberian Military Flotilla moved from Nikolayevsk-on-Amur to Vladivostok, and the Great Northern Telegraph Company connected Vladivostok to Nagasaki and Shanghai by underwater cable.

Vladivostok's first street was Amerikanskaya Street (ул. Американская), named for the corvette America in 1871. Two years later, it was renamed Svetlanskaya Street (ул. Светланская) in honor of the frigate Svetlana on which Grand Duke Alexei Alexandrovich of Russia visited Vladivostok. At that time, it consisted of present Svetlanskaya Street from Amursky Bay to number 85. Its other parts were separate streets with names such as Portovaya (Портовая), Afanasyevskaya (Афанасьевская), and Ekipazhnaya (Экипажная).

In 1878, 40 percent of the city's over 4,000 residents were foreigners. This was reflected in street names such as Koreyskaya (Korean), Pekinskaya (Peking), and Kitayskaya (Chinese), whose present names are Pogranichnaya (ул. Пограничная), Admirala Fokina (ул. Адмирала Фокина), and Okeansky Avenue (Океанский проспект).

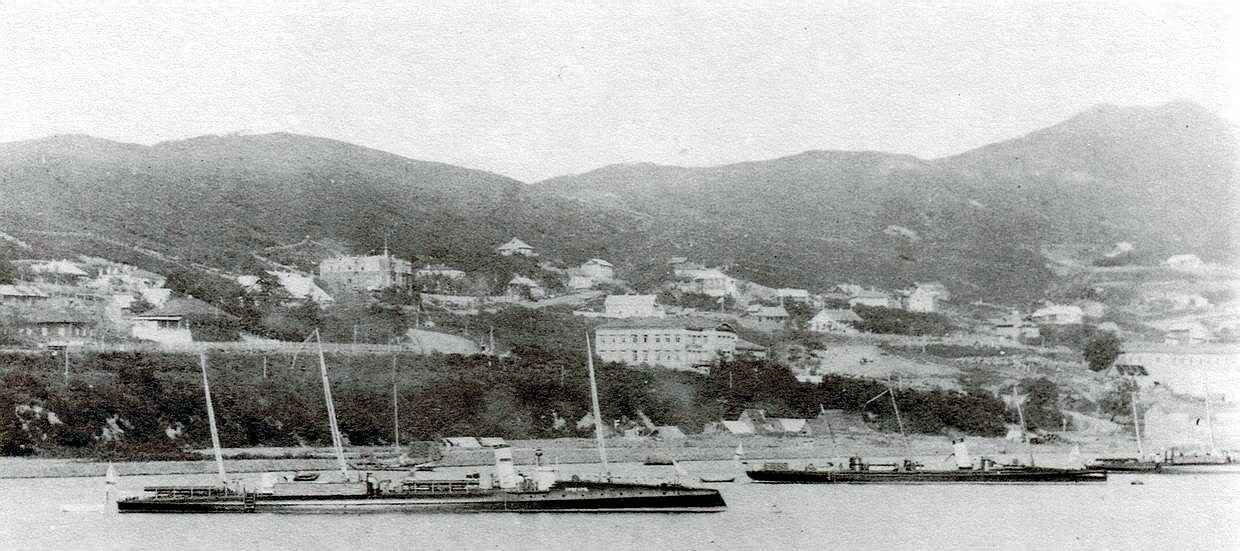
Imperial Russian Navy torpedo boat Sungari at Vladivostok

In 1880 the Russian Volunteer Fleet, with government aid, organized regular trips to Odessa and Saint Petersburg. On April 28, 1880 (May 10 Gregorian style), Vladivostok was officially proclaimed a city and a separate administrative unit from Primorskaya Oblast. At that time the city population was 7,300, double that of 1878. Three hotels were in operation: the Moscow, the Vladivostok, and the Hotel de Louvre.

In 1883 the Resettlement Administration was established in Vladivostok, and Russian Volunteer Fleet steamships began a mass transport of peasants from European Russia to the Far East. Vladivostok became a shipping center, and in 1888 the residence of the oblast governor was moved from Khabarovsk to the city. In 1889 Vladivostok was proclaimed a fortress and two torpedo boats, brought disassembled from the Black Sea, were launched.

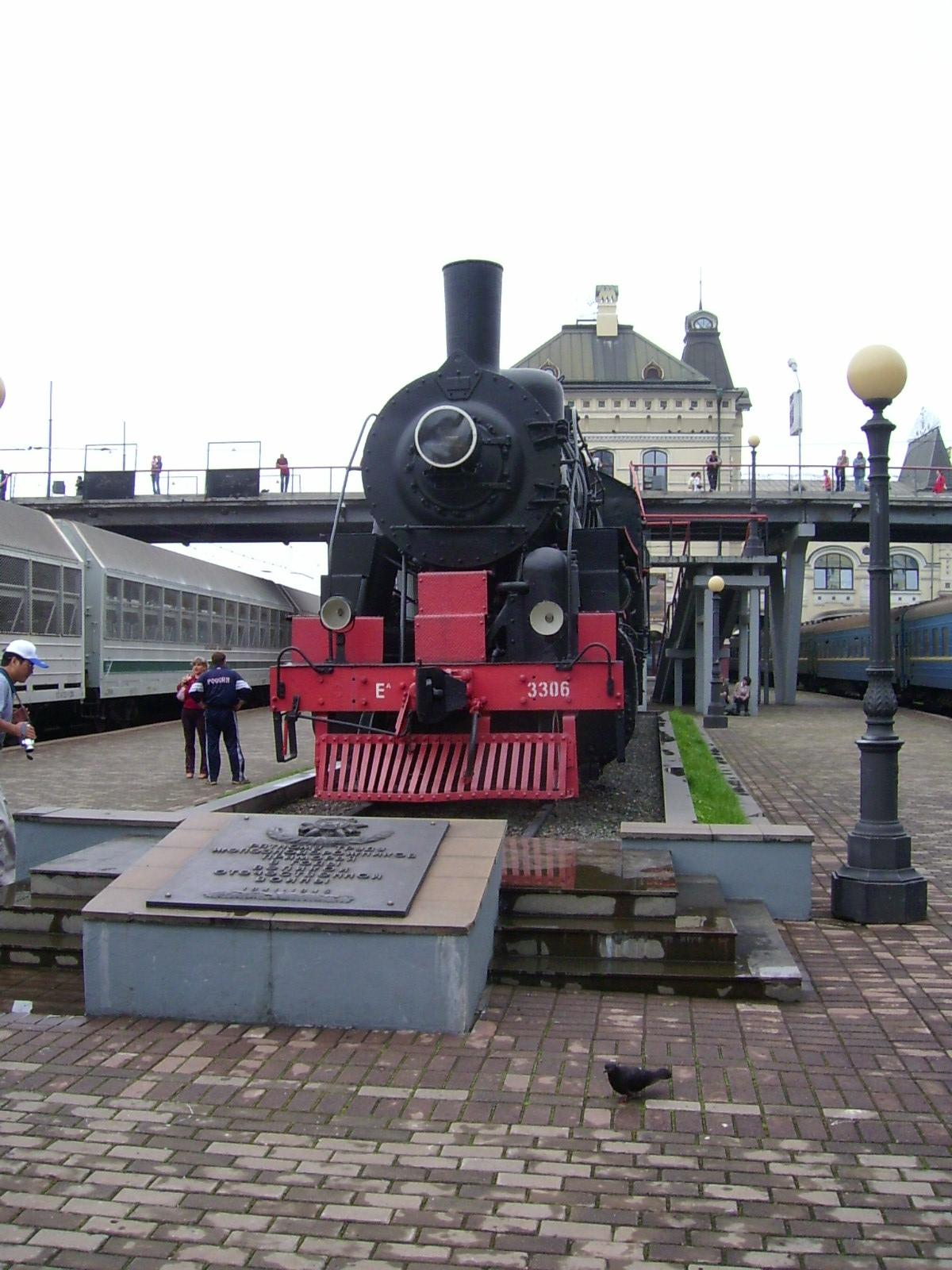
Trans-Siberian Railway terminal in Vladivostok

During the 1880s Vladivostok's cultural life improved, and a music school at the Siberian Fleet Depot was opened. In 1883 the city's first newspaper (Vladivostok) began, and the following year the Society of the Amursky Territory Study (headed by Fyodor F. Busse) was founded. In 1887 a public library opened, and a professional theater performed in Vladivostok for the first time. Trees were planted along the main streets, and 120 kerosene streetlamps were installed.

By the end of the 1880s Vladivostok had about 600 wooden and more than 50 stone houses, some two or three stories. Most buildings were grouped in the area of today's central square and the Matrosskaya Sloboda (Sailors' Suburb), from the Obyasneniya River to the Gaydamak tram stop. In 1891, construction of the Trans-Siberian Railway began in Vladivostok. During the 1890s, shipping to Kobe, Nagasaki, and Shanghai began. In 1897 a new commercial port was opened in Vladivostok, and regular rail service to Khabarovsk began.

In 1899 the first Far Eastern higher educational institution, the Oriental Institute, was established. It presently houses the main building of Far Eastern State Technical University (FESTU).

From 1899 to 1909, four theaters opened in Vladivostok: the Tikhy Okean (Pacific Ocean) Theater, the Public Theater (inspired by the Moscow Artistic Theater), the Zolotoy Rog (Golden Horn) Theater, and the Pushkin Theater (which hosted Russian actress Vera Kommisarzhevskaya). In 1912 a newspaper, The Theater and Music, was first published.

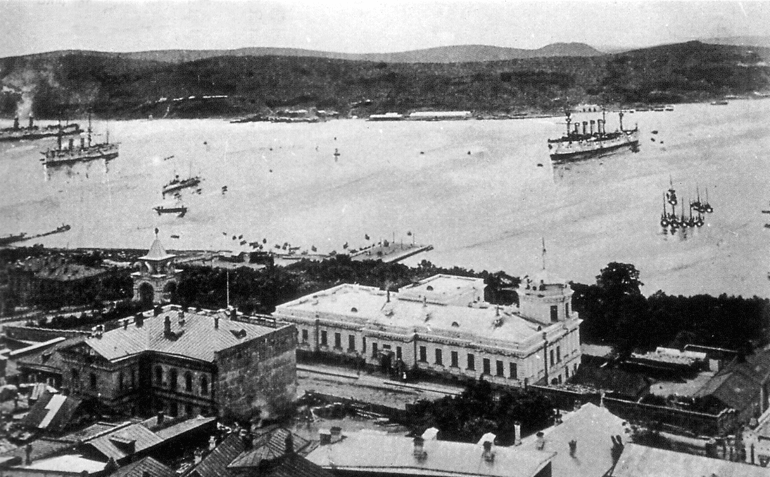
Cruiser Gromoboi in Golden Horn Bay, 1903

During the Russo-Japanese War, a Japanese squadron of warships fired on the city. The Vladivostok Cruiser Group participated in the war, blocking approaches to besieged Port-Arthur.

Vladivostok was involved in the Revolution of 1905, and was governed by rebel military units in early 1906. Unrest in the city was quelled with force and diplomacy by General Georgi Kazbek.

During the period between the two Russian revolutions (1907–1917) a 17th-century-style railway station, a power station, two girls' schools, a school of commerce, and the Versailles Hotel were built, and trams began operating. In 1909 the port was visited by 795 steamships, including 477 foreign ships, and there were about 3,000 shops in Vladivostok. In 1913, local publishers produced 61 titles in Russian and other languages.

=== After the Revolution ===
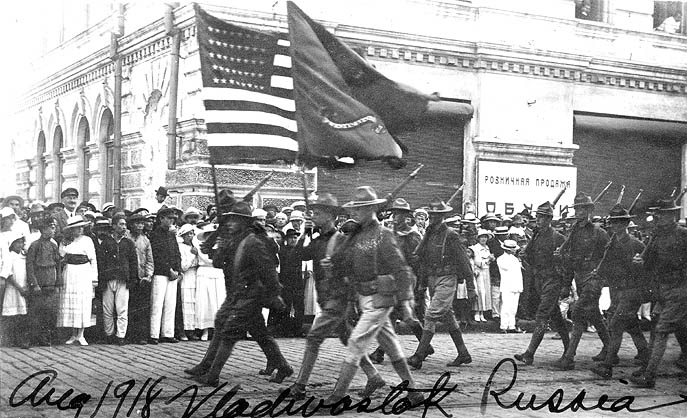
American Wolfhounds on parade in Vladivostok, August 1918

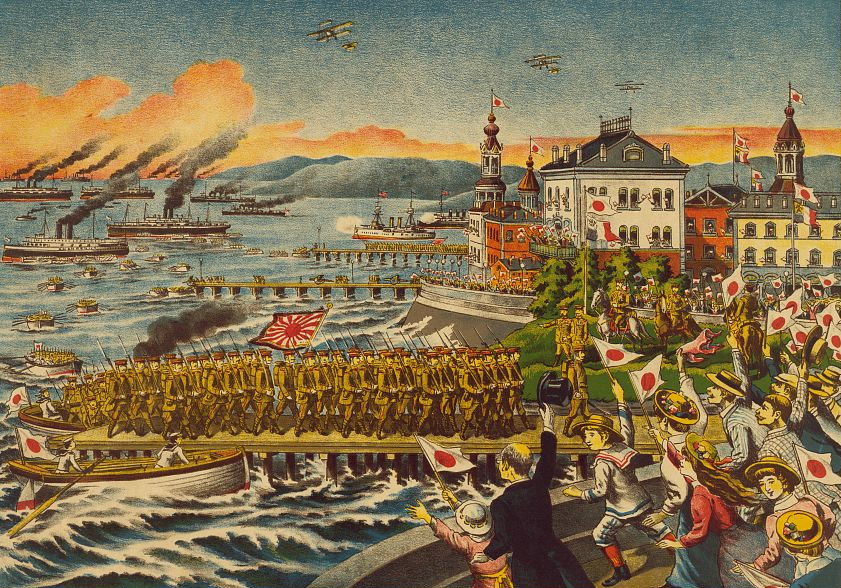
A 1919 poster depicting the Japanese occupation of Vladivostok

After the October Revolution of 1917, on December 31, Japanese, British and American cruisers entered Golden Horn Bay. In April 1918, the Japanese company Isido was attacked in Vladivostok. After this incident, the Japanese and British commands landed troops to protect their citizens. The Entente soon expanded its Siberian Intervention; Canada sent 4,000 troops, headquartered in the Pushkin Theater with a barracks at Second River and Gornostai Bay.

Bolshevik supporters conducted a partisan struggle in the city. From 1916 through 1922, Vladivostok's population went from 97,000 to 410,000 as opponents of the new regime (including the White Army) retreated to the east.

From 1920 to 1922, cultural refugees from Moscow and Saint Petersburg founded two conservatories, two theaters and several symphony orchestras and published art magazines. After the Bolshevik victory, most moved abroad and by 1926 Vladivostok had a population of 108,000.

On October 25, 1922, the last interventionist units left the city, and the Red Army assumed control. On November 15 the Far Eastern Republic, which had existed since 1920, became part of the RSFSR.

The Bolsheviks understood Vladivostok's strategic importance, and during the 1920s and 1930s reconstruction of its port began. In the early 1930s direct air service to Moscow began, and in 1932 the city became the base of the Pacific Naval Fleet.

During the early 1920s, Far Eastern State University was established in Vladivostok; in the late 1930s, under Stalin, it was closed for twenty years. In 1925 the Pacific Scientific-Commercial Station, reorganized as the Pacific Scientific-Research Institute of Fisheries and Oceanography (TINRO) in 1930, was established in the city. In 1932, the Far Eastern Division of the USSR Academy of Sciences was founded.

In 1926, Vladivostok's first radio station began broadcasting. Three theaters and three cinemas were opened in the city in 1931. The Primorye Picture Gallery's collection was assembled from 1929 to 1931. About 1,000 pictures were brought there from the Hermitage, the Russian Museum and the Tretyakovskaya Gallery.

Many ethnic groups considered rebellious by Stalin's eyes, including Chinese, Manchu, Jews, Ukrainians, Poles, Crimean Tatars, Chechens, and Armenians, were transported. During the 1930s mass repression began in the country, and a transit camp for political prisoners sent from western Russia to Kolyma was opened in Vladivostok. The prisoners arrived by train and left on prison ships in terrible conditions. Soviets at first, after 1939 the prisoners came from Eastern Europe and were Japanese POWs after World War II. Factories, ports and cities in the Far East were built by prison labor during the 1930s. After American pilots bombed Tokyo on April 18, 1942, one of the sixteen B-25 bombers landed in Vladivostok when it ran out of fuel; the bomber was confiscated and its crew interned. Although Captain Edward York and his crewmates were well-treated, diplomatic efforts to return them to the United States failed. They were eventually moved to Ashgabat (32 kilometres or 20 miles from the Iranian border); York bribed a smuggler to help them cross the border and reach a nearby British consulate on 11 May 1943. According to declassified Soviet archives, the smuggling was staged by the NKVD because the Soviet government felt it could not repatriate them legally due to its neutrality pact with Japan.

In 1954 First Secretary of the Communist Party Nikita Khrushchev visited Vladivostok, the first Russian leader to do so. After Khrushchev's visit, urban development began.

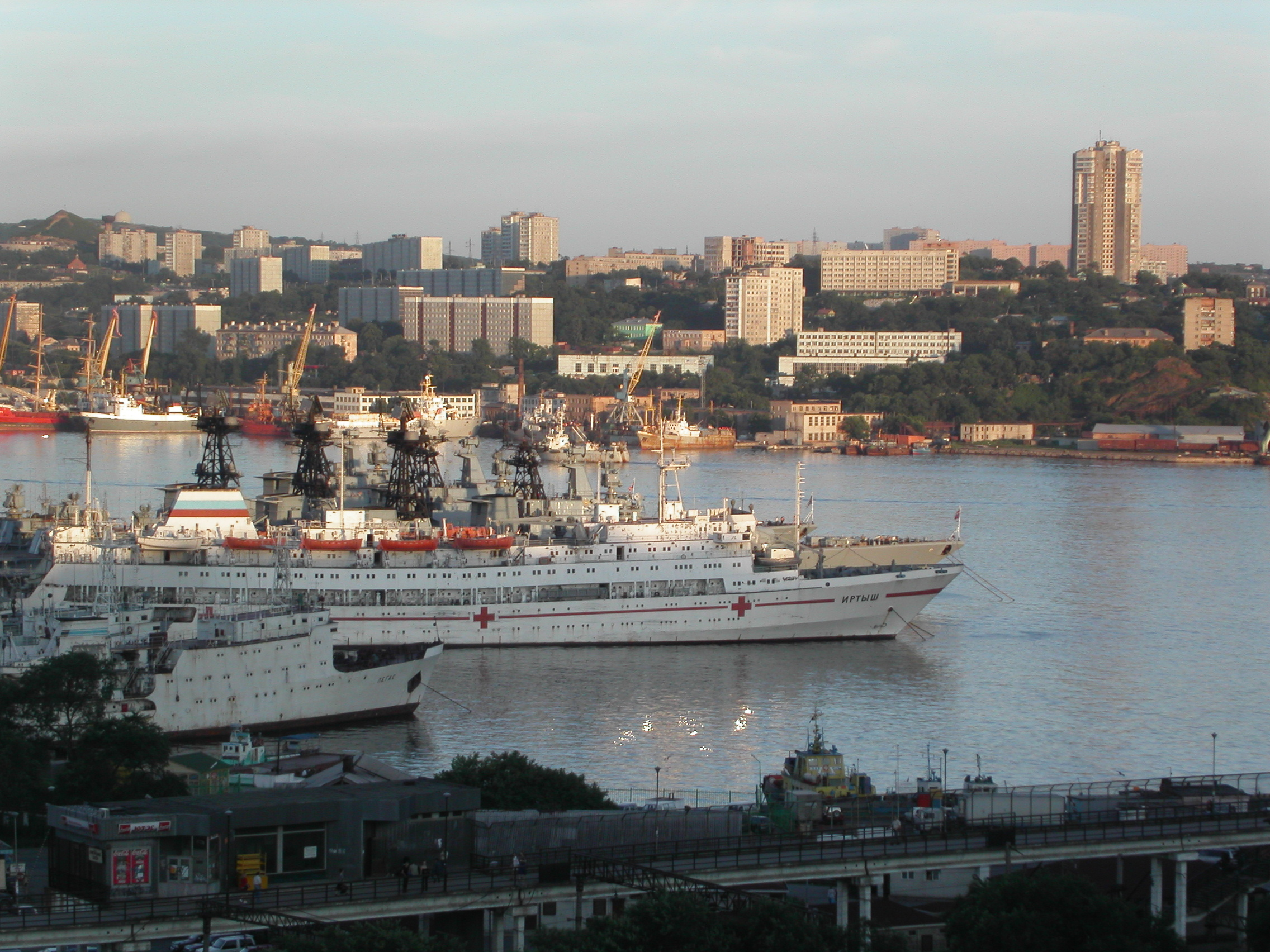
Vladivostok in 2003

In 1956 the Far Eastern State University, the only classical university in the Russian Far East, was reopened. The microdistrict of Churkin was built during the late 1950s, and Vtoraya Rechka (Second River) and Morgorodok were developed during the early 1960s. Vladivostok's last large district built with new, multistory houses is at Patrisa Lumumby and Neybuta Streets, begun in 1980.

From the 1950s to the 1980s the fishing industry was developed. For many years the ports of Vladivostok ranked first in freight turnover in the Russian Far East, recently yielding to Nakhodka. The city also produced a large volume of military goods.

From 1930 to the 1970s, foreigners were not allowed to visit Vladivostok, but in 1974 the Vladivostok Summit Meeting on Arms Control was held with General Secretary of the Central Committee of the Communist Party of the Soviet Union (CPSU) Leonid Brezhnev and US president Gerald Ford. After Ford's visit the city, home to the Pacific Fleet, was again closed until 1992. As of 1996 there were six consulates, four offices of Japanese television companies, a US information service, more than 100 offices of foreign companies and about 600 joint ventures in Vladivostok.

December 2008 protests in the city against higher import duties on used cars were reported around the world, although coverage was limited in Russia. The protests were seen as the first visible public anger at the Russian government's response to the 2008 financial crisis. Police clad in riot gear detained protesters as other demonstrators blocked roads, lit flares and bonfires in protests which blocked traffic in the city centre. Another protest later briefly blockaded the city's airport.

== Rival claims settled ==
In 2005, Beijing and Moscow ratified an agreement that ended more than three and half centuries of their struggle over territory and for dominance. Nevertheless, complaints continue in the Chinese media.

In July 2020, in response to Russian celebrations on Chinese social media website Weibo for 160 years of Vladivostok, the official Chinese state broadcaster China Global Television Network said "This tweet of Russian embassy to China isn't so welcome on Weibo. The history of Vladivostok is far from 1860 when Russia built a military harbour. The city was Hai Shen Wai as Chinese land – before Russia annexed it".

== See also ==
- Vladivostok
- Timeline of Vladivostok history
- Russian Far East

== Bibliography ==
- Deeg, Lothar. Kunst and Albers Vladivostok: The History of a German Trading Company in the Russian Far East 1864–1924 (epubli, 2013).
- Maxwell. Neville. "How the Sino-Russian boundary conflict was finally settled: From Nerchinsk 1689 to Vladivostok 2005 via Zhenbao Island 1969." Critical Asian Studies 39.2 (2007): 229–253. online
- Moor, V., and E. Erysheva. "Development and Diversification of Urban and Architectural Space Structures in Vladivostok." Urbanism and Architecture 14 (2005): 30–36.
- Richardson, William. "Vladivostok: city of three eras." Planning Perspectives 10.1 (1995): 43–65.
- Richardson, William Harrison. "Planning a model Soviet city: Transforming Vladivostok under Stalin and Brezhnev." A| Z ITU Journal of the Faculty of Architecture 8.1 (2011): 129–142.
- Stephan, John J. The Russian Far East: A History. (LIT Verlag Münster, 1994).
- Trofimov, Vladimir et al. Old Vladivostok. (Utro Rossii Vladivostok, 1992) ISBN 5-87080-004-8
