= 2008 Russian elections =

- 2 March 2008; 12 October 2008

16 regional parliaments
- Regions where a legislative election took place

The 2008 Russian elections took place on 2 March and 12 October 2008 (both known as "single voting day"), including presidential election and 16 regional legislative elections.

== Presidential election ==
Presidential election was held on 2 March 2008. Dmitry Medvedev was elected president for a four-year term with 70.3% of the vote. Incumbent president Vladimir Putin was term-limited.

== Legislative elections ==
=== March ===
Legislature	Voting system	Party-list results					District seats	Majority
Legislature	Voting system	UR	CPRF	LDPR	SR	Other (Note: Only parties that crossed the threshold are included.)	District seats	Majority
Bashkortostan, State Assembly	60 PR + 60 FPTP)	85.77% (55)	7.24% (5)	2.18%	3.53%	—	UR 55, Ind 4, CPRF 1	110 / 120
Ingushetia, People's Assembly	27 PR (Note: Down from 34 seats in previous election.)	74.09% (20)	7.34% (2)	11.06% (4)	7.39% (2)	—	none	20 / 27
Kalmykia, People's Khural	27 PR	54.58% (17)	22.63% (7)	3.66%	4.97%	APR 7.69% (3)	none	17 / 27
Sakha (Yakutia), State Assembly	35 PR + 35 FPTP	51.80% (20)	15.97% (6)	6.40%	14.93% (6)	APR 8.53% (3)	UR 16, Ind 13, APR 3, CPRF 1, vacant 2	36 / 70
Altai Krai Legislative Assembly	34 PR + 34 FPTP	53.44% (18)	19.60% (7)	16.45% (6)	7.72% (3)	—	UR 20, Ind 7, SR 6, APR 1	38 / 68
Amur Oblast, Legislative Assembly	36 PR	62.43% (25)	17.54% (7)	11.01% (4)	5.48%	—	none	25 / 36
Ivanovo Oblast Duma	24 PR + 24 FPTP	60.30% (15)	15.34% (4)	8.61% (2)	10.27% (3)	—	UR 16, Ind 6, CPRF 1	31 / 48
Rostov Oblast, Legislative Assembly	25 PR + 25 FPTP	71.88% (20)	15.81% (5)	5.77%	5.06%	—	UR 25	45 / 50
Sverdlovsk Oblast, Legislative Assembly	14 PR (Note: Half of the seats in the Oblast Duma.) + 21 FPTP (Note: All seats in the House of Representatives.)	58.43% (10)	12.20% (2)	16.07% (2)	6.26%	—	UR 21	10 / 14 21 / 21
Ulyanovsk Oblast, Legislative Assembly	15 PR + 15 FPTP	66.36% (10)	15.95% (3)	7.39% (1)	7.77% (1)	—	UR 14, SR 1	24 / 30
Yaroslavl Oblast, State Duma	25 PR + 25 FPTP	50.02% (15)	14.60% (4)	12.58% (4)	did not stand	PoR 5.92% (2)	UR 16, Ind 9	31 / 50
Total (incl. district seats)	561 seats	408	55	23	22	53	—	408 / 561

=== October ===
Legislature	Voting system	Party-list results					District seats	Majority
Legislature	Voting system	UR	CPRF	LDPR	SR	Other	District seats	Majority
Chechnya, Parliament	41 PR (Note: Bicameral parliament (40 + 18 seats) was replaced with unicameral one following a referendum.)	88.40% (37)	0.33%	0.18%	9.20% (4)	—	none	37 / 41
Zabaykalsky Krai, Legislative Assembly	25 PR + 20 FPTP + 5 MNTV (Note: Five-member district covering the former Agin-Buryat Autonomous Okrug.)	54.81% (14)	13.41% (4)	10.81% (3)	9.30% (2)	APR 6.90% (2)	UR 19, Ind 4, CPRF 1, APR 1	33 / 50
Irkutsk Oblast, Legislative Assembly	25 PR + 21 FPTP + 4 MNTV (Note: Four-member district covering the former Ust-Orda Buryat Autonomous Okrug.)	49.45% (15)	13.25% (4)	15.07% (4)	8.11% (2)	—	UR 16, Ind 6, APR 2, SR 1	31 / 50
Kemerovo Oblast, Council of People's Deputies	18 PR + 18 FPTP (Note: Total 36 seats, up from 35 in previous election.)	84.79% (17)	3.47%	4.66%	5.51% (1)	—	UR 18	35 / 36
Sakhalin Oblast Duma	14 PR + 14 FPTP	55.27% (9)	23.11% (3)	9.85% (1)	8.46% (1)	—	UR 12, CPRF 1, SR 1	21 / 28
Total (incl. district seats)	205 seats	157	13	8	12	15	—	157 / 205

== Mayoral elections ==
Elections for mayor were held in 18 capital cities of federal subjects of Russia.

City	Date	Incumbent	Incumbent since	Candidates	Result
Abakan, Khakassia	2 March	Nikolay Bulakin	1995	✓ Nikolay Bulakin (Ind) 82.65%; Valery Starostin (LDPR) 7.31%	Incumbent re-elected.
Barnaul, Altai Krai	2 March	Vladimir Kolganov	2003	✓ Vladimir Kolganov (UR) 61.91%; Sergey Mamayev (Ind) 19.58%; Pavel Chesnov (Ind) 6.47%; Vasily Vyalykh (Ind) 5.54%	Incumbent re-elected.
Gorno-Altaysk, Altai Republic	2 March	Viktor Oblogin	1992	✓ Viktor Oblogin (Ind) 68.95%; Oleg Pyankov (Ind) 22.50%	Incumbent re-elected.
Kemerovo, Kemerovo Oblast	2 March	Vladimir Mikhailov	1991	✓ Vladimir Mikhailov (UR) 85.34%; Vladimir Poleshchuk (Ind) 13.17%	Incumbent re-elected.
Khanty-Mansiysk, Khanty-Mansi AO	2 March	Valery Sudeykin (resigned)	2001	✓ Andrey Bukarinov (UR) 82.53%; Aleksandr Pulinovich (Ind) 9.08%	New mayor elected to a vacant position.
Krasnoyarsk, Krasnoyarsk Krai	2 March	Pyotr Pimashkov	1996	✓ Pyotr Pimashkov (UR) 70.43%; Valery Sergiyenko (CPRF) 14.94%; Yevgeny Malchikov (Ind) 6.31%	Incumbent re-elected.
Maykop, Adygea	2 March	Mikhail Chernichenko	1991	✓ Mikhail Chernichenko (UR) 65.60%; Lazar Afanasyev (Ind) 19.61%; Igor Didenko (Ind) 11.23%	Incumbent re-elected.
Veliky Novgorod, Novgorod Oblast	2 March	Nikolay Grazhdankin (resigned); Yury Bobryshev (acting)	2002	✓ Yury Bobryshev (Ind) 75.54%; Dmitry Skoropisov (Ind) 8.95%	Acting mayor elected for a full term.
Voronezh, Voronezh Oblast	2 March	Boris Skrynnikov	2003	✓ Sergey Koliukh (UR) 31.08%; Galina Kudryavtseva (Ind) 16.14%; Viktor Vitinik (Ind) 12.83%; Yury Matveyev (Ind) 10.52%; Andrey Pomerantsev (CPRF) 6.76%; Boris Skrynnikov (Ind) 5.86%	Incumbent lost re-election. New mayor elected.
Yaroslavl, Yaroslavl Oblast	2 March	Viktor Volonchunas	1991	✓ Viktor Volonchunas (UR) 72.03%; Vera Nikolskaya (Ind) 9.99%; Aleksandr Simon (Ind) 7.61%; Nikolay Postnikov (Ind) 5.64%	Incumbent re-elected.
Yekaterinburg, Sverdlovsk Oblast	2 March	Arkady Chernetsky	1992	✓ Arkady Chernetsky (UR) 54.01%; Oleg Khabibullin (Ind) 23.70%; Aleksey Yesaulkov (Ind) 9.62%; Viktor Ufimtsev (LDPR) 6.82%	Incumbent re-elected.
Naryan-Mar, Nenets AO	18 May	Leonid Sablin (resigned)	2005	✓ Yury Rodionovsky (Ind) 36.49%; Olga Starostina (Ind) 27.78%; Tatyana Fyodorova (Ind) 18.26%; Aleksandr Bebenin (Ind) 10.41%	Former mayor re-elected.
Vladivostok, Primorsky Krai	18 May	Vladimir Nikolayev (removed)	2004	✓ Igor Pushkaryov (UR) 57.03%; Gennady Turmov (CPRF) 32.84%; Vladimir Gilgenberg (Ind) 5.85%	New mayor elected to a vacant position.
Arkhangelsk, Arkhangelsk Oblast	25 May	Alexander Donskoy (removed); Viktor Pavlenko (acting)	2005	✓ Viktor Pavlenko (Ind) 37.40%; Larisa Bazanova (Ind) 37.25%; Mikhail Kachanov (LDPR) 8.81%	Acting mayor elected for a full term.
Khabarovsk, Khabarovsk Krai	12 October	Aleksandr Sokolov	2000	✓ Aleksandr Sokolov (UR) 79.89%; Boris Serebryakov (Ind) 18.02%	Incumbent re-elected.
Magadan, Magadan Oblast	12 October	Vladimir Pechyony	2004	✓ Vladimir Pechyony (UR) 85.90%; Igor Novikov (Ind) 11.51%	Incumbent re-elected.
Stavropol, Stavropol Krai	12 October	Dmitry Kuzmin	2003	✓ Nikolai Paltsev (UR) 75.49%; Viktor Goncharov (CPRF) 14.41%	Incumbent did not stand for re-election. New mayor elected.
Vologda, Vologda Oblast	12 October	Aleksey Yakunichev (resigned)	1995	✓ Evgeny Shulepov (UR) 56.12%; Sergey Potapov (CPRF) 21.61%; Sergey Karginov (LDPR) 7.69%	New mayor elected to a vacant position.

== Source ==
- Кынев, Александр (2009). Выборы парламентов российских регионов 2003-2009: Первый цикл внедрения пропорциональной избирательной системы [Elections of Russian regional parliaments 2003-2009: First cycle of implementation of the proportional electoral system] (PDF) (in Russian). М.: Панорама. ISBN 978-5-94420-036-5. Archived from the original (PDF) on 8 December 2024.
