= Nikolay Komarov =

Nikolay Komarov may refer to:

- Nikolay Vasilyevich Komarov (1831-?), Russian non-commissioned officer and founder of Vladivostok
- Nikolay Komarov (politician) (1886–1937), Russian revolutionary and a Soviet politician in 10th Orgburo of the Russian Communist Party (Bolsheviks)
- Mykola Komarov (born 1961), Soviet rower
