= VSMU =

VSMU can refer to:

- Vladivostok State Medical University
- Academy of Performing Arts in Bratislava (Vysoká škola múzických umení v Bratislave, VŠMU)
