= Burachek =

Burachek, Burachyok (Ukrainian: Бурачек) is a surname. Notable people with the surname include:

- Mykola Burachek (1871–1942), Ukrainian impressionist painter and pedagogue
- Yevgeny Burachyok (1836–1911), Russian seaman and the second head of Vladivostok garrison
