= Eastern Economic Forum =

Forum encouraging foreign investment in Russian Far East

Far Eastern Economic Forum
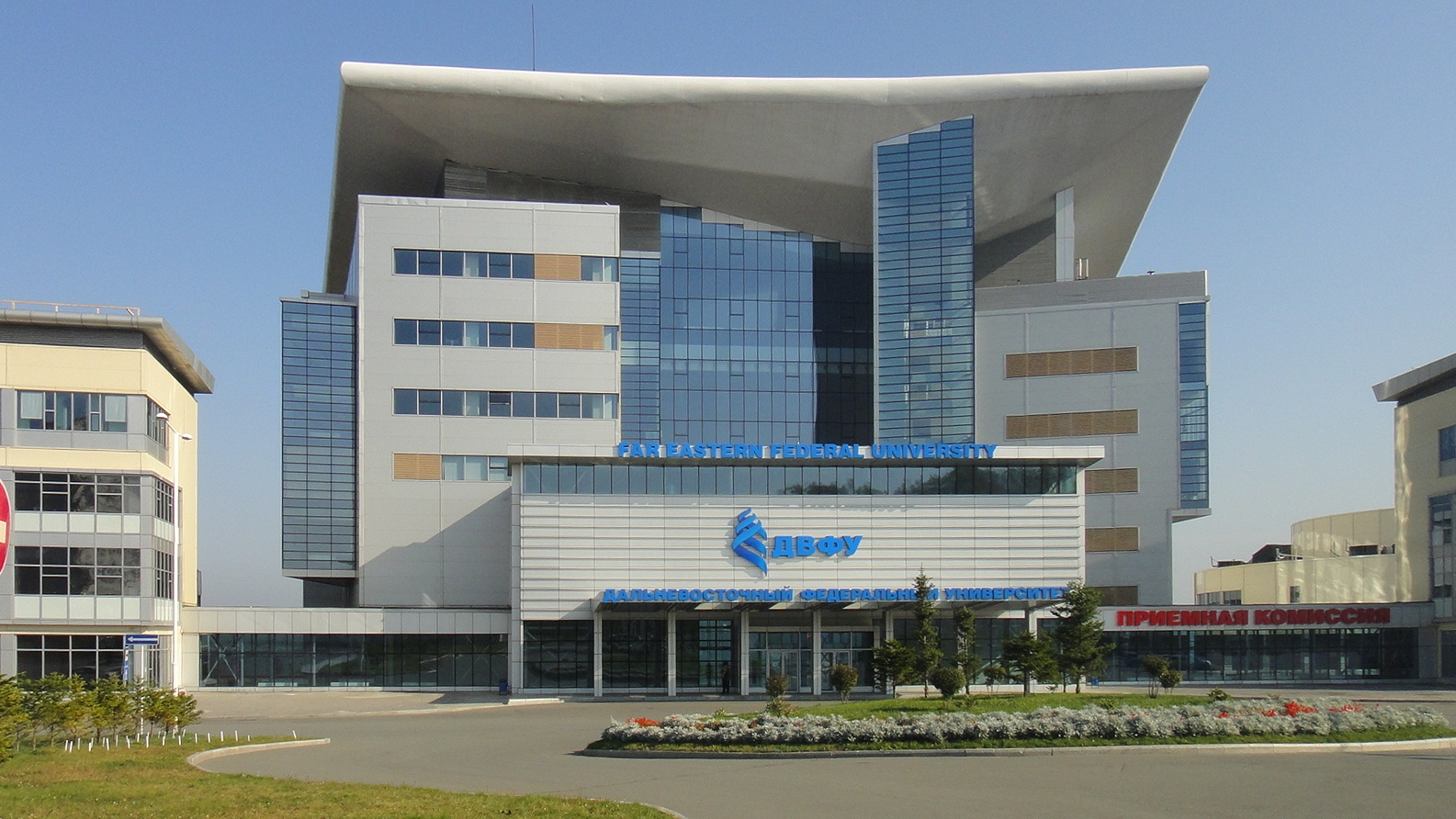
- A Far Eastern Federal University building which serves as a venue for the forum
- Formation: 2015
- Headquarters: Vladivostok, Russia
- Location: Far Eastern Federal University
- Region served: Russian Far East
- Organizer: Russian Government, Roscongress Foundation
- Website: forumvostok.ru/en/

Eastern Economic Forum (Russian: Восточный экономический форум or ВЭФ) is an international forum held each year in Vladivostok, Russia, for the purpose of encouraging foreign investment in the Russian Far East.

With the exception of 2020, the forum has been held in September of each year since 2015. The 2020 forum was cancelled due to the COVID pandemic. The Far Eastern Federal University in Vladivostok, Russia has been the venue of the forum since its inception.

The Far East Economic Forum is sponsored by the organizing committee whose members are appointed by Roscongress, an association of the Russian Government which also sponsors other international forums, such as the St. Petersburg International Economic Forum.

Year	Dates	Notable guests
2015	September 3-5	
2016		Vladimir Putin, President of Russia; Shinzo Abe, Prime Minister of Japan
2017	September 6-7	Vladimir Putin, President of Russia; Shinzo Abe, Prime Minister of Japan; Moon Jae-in, President of South Korea; Khaltmaagiin Battulga, President of Mongolia
2018	September 11-13	Vladimir Putin, President of Russia; Xi Jinping, Paramount leader of China; Shinzo Abe, Prime Minister of Japan
2019		Vladimir Putin, President of Russia; Mahathir Mohamad, Prime Minister of Malaysia
~~2020~~	~~September 2-5~~	Cancelled due to the COVID pandemic
2021	September 2-4	
2022	September 5-8	
2023		Pany Yathotou, Vice President of Laos
2024		Anwar Ibrahim, Prime Minister of Malaysia
2025	September 3-6	Vladimir Putin, President of Russia; Sonexay Siphandone, Prime Minister of Laos; Zandanshatar Gombojav, Prime Minister of Mongolia (China) Li Hongzhong, a Vice Chairman of the National People's Congress
2026	September 1-4	Prabowo Subianto, President of Indonesia

== Gallery ==
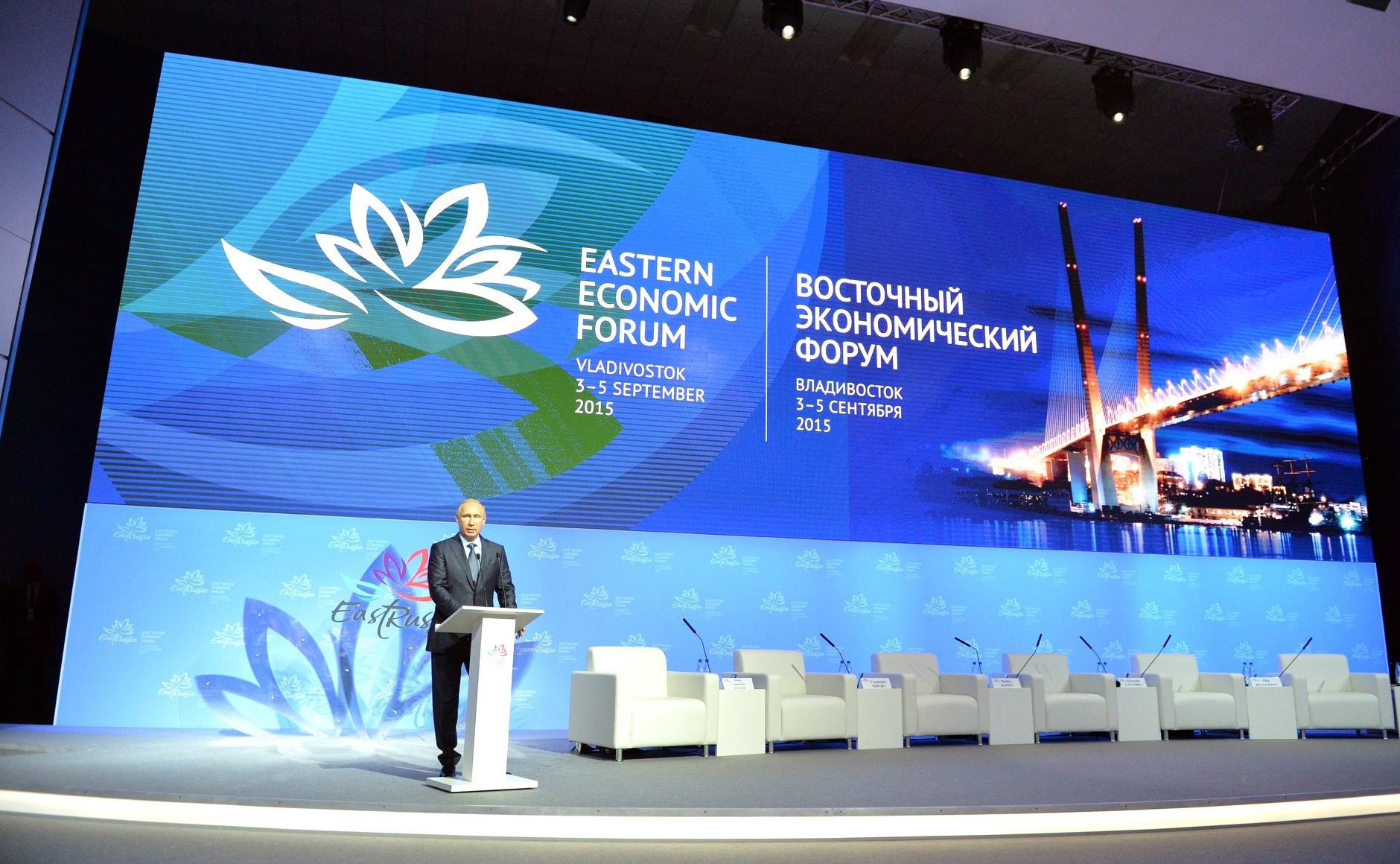
2015 Forum: President of Russia Vladimir Putin addressing the forum

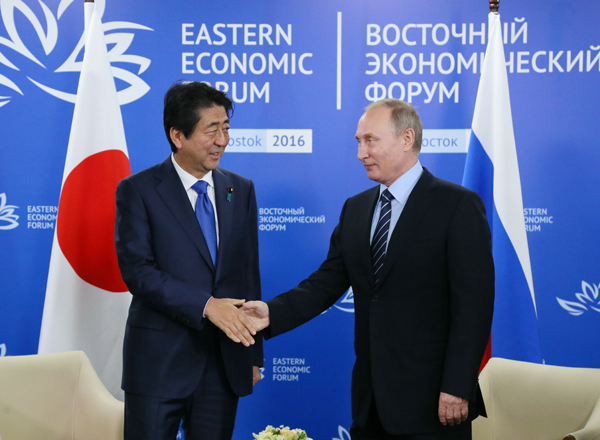
2016 Forum: Prime Minister of Japan Shinzo Abe (left) and President of Russia Vladimir Putin (right)

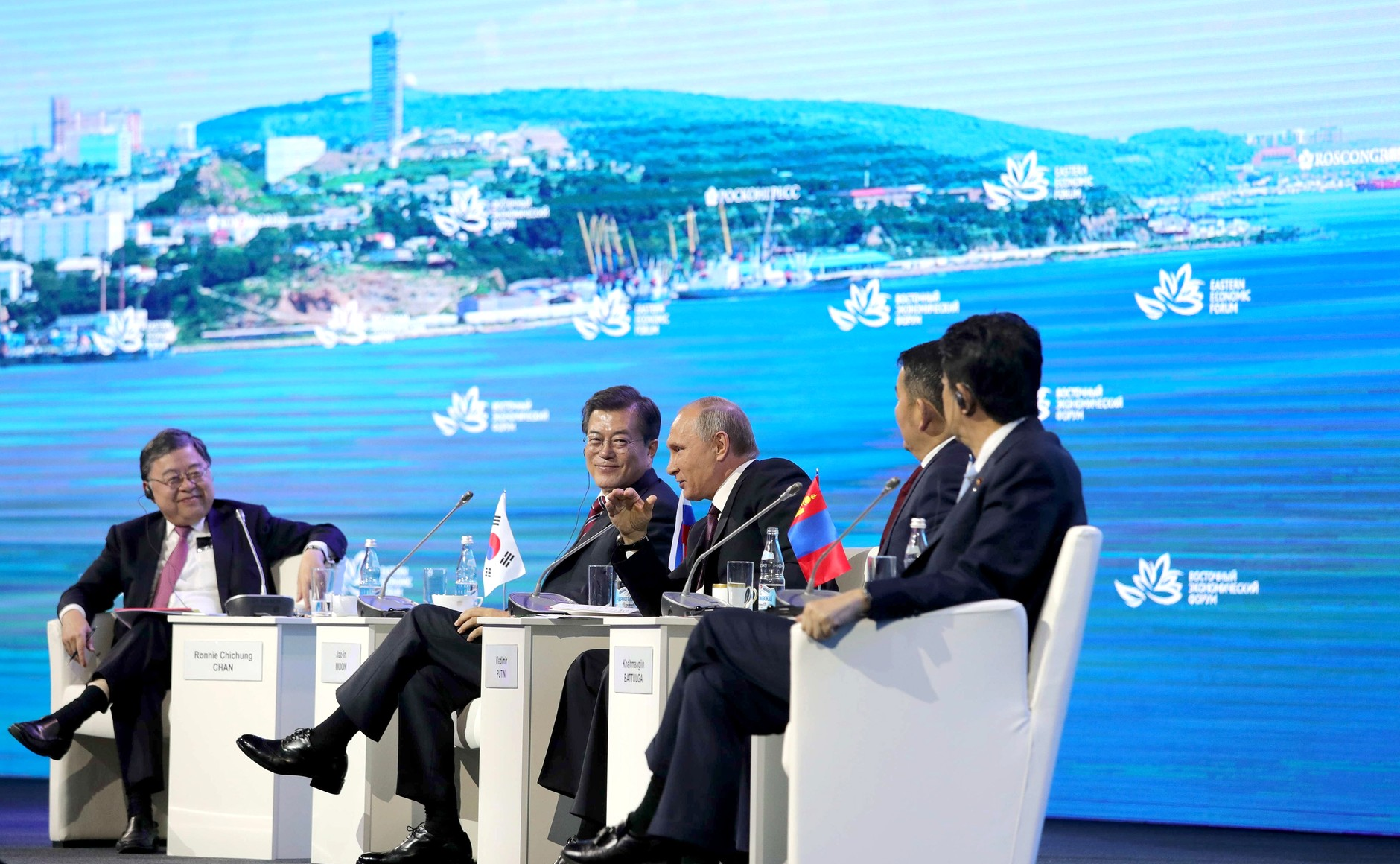
2017 Forum:

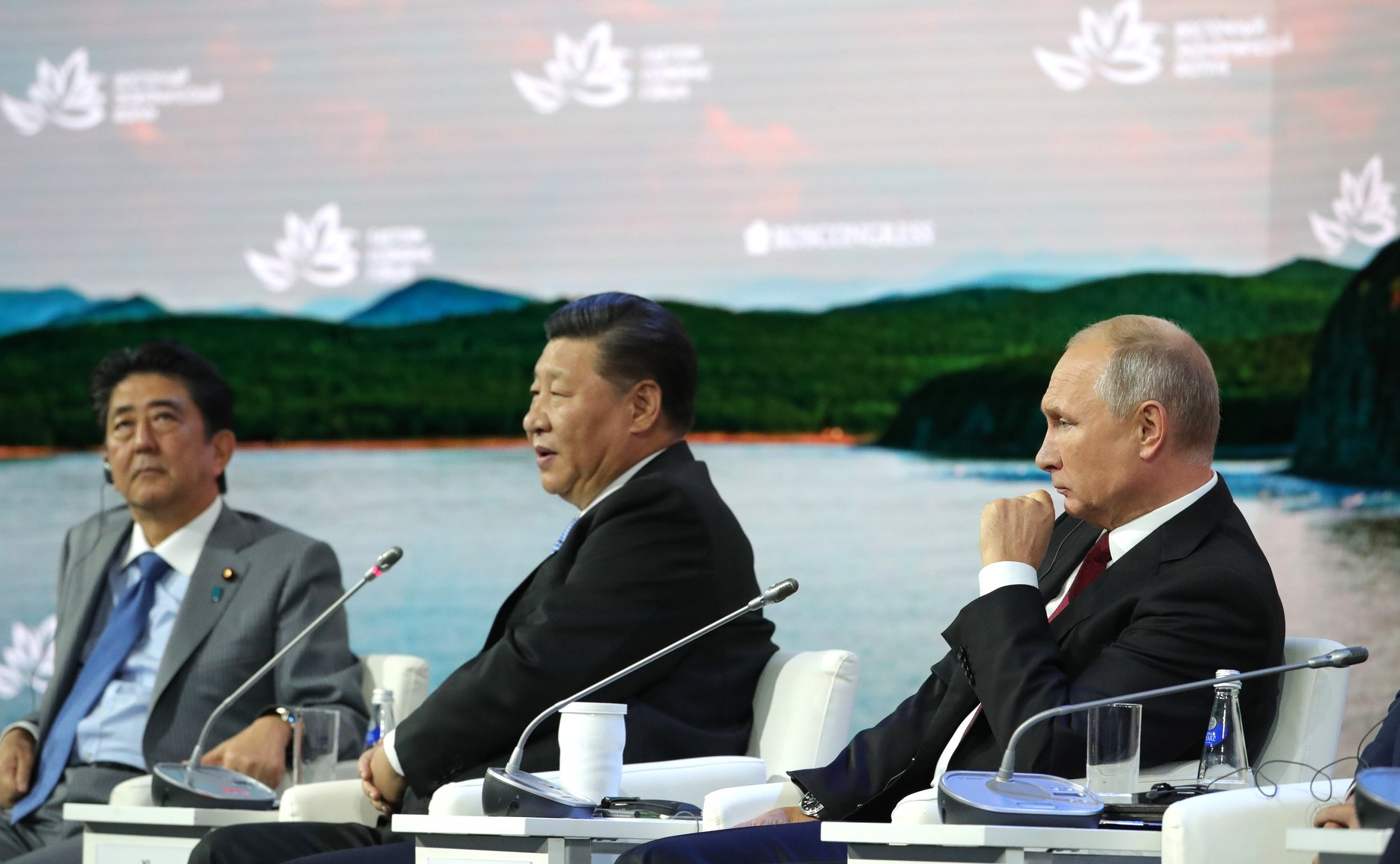
2018 Forum: (left to right) Prime Minister of Japan Shinzo Abe, Paramount leader of China Xi Jinping, and President of Russia Vladimir Putin

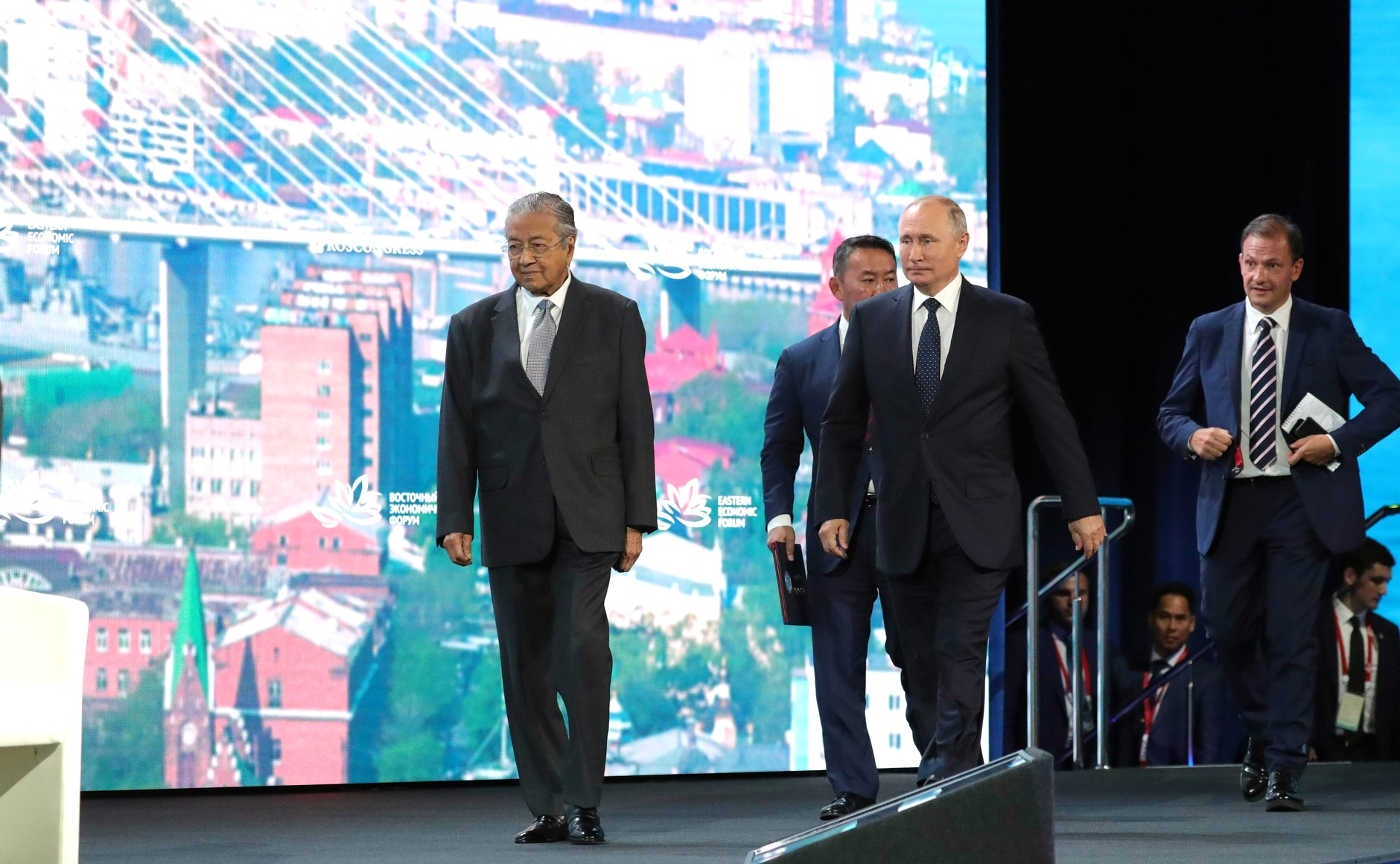
2019 Forum: Prime Minister of Malaysia Mahathir Mohamad (front left) and President of Russia Vladimir Putin (front right)

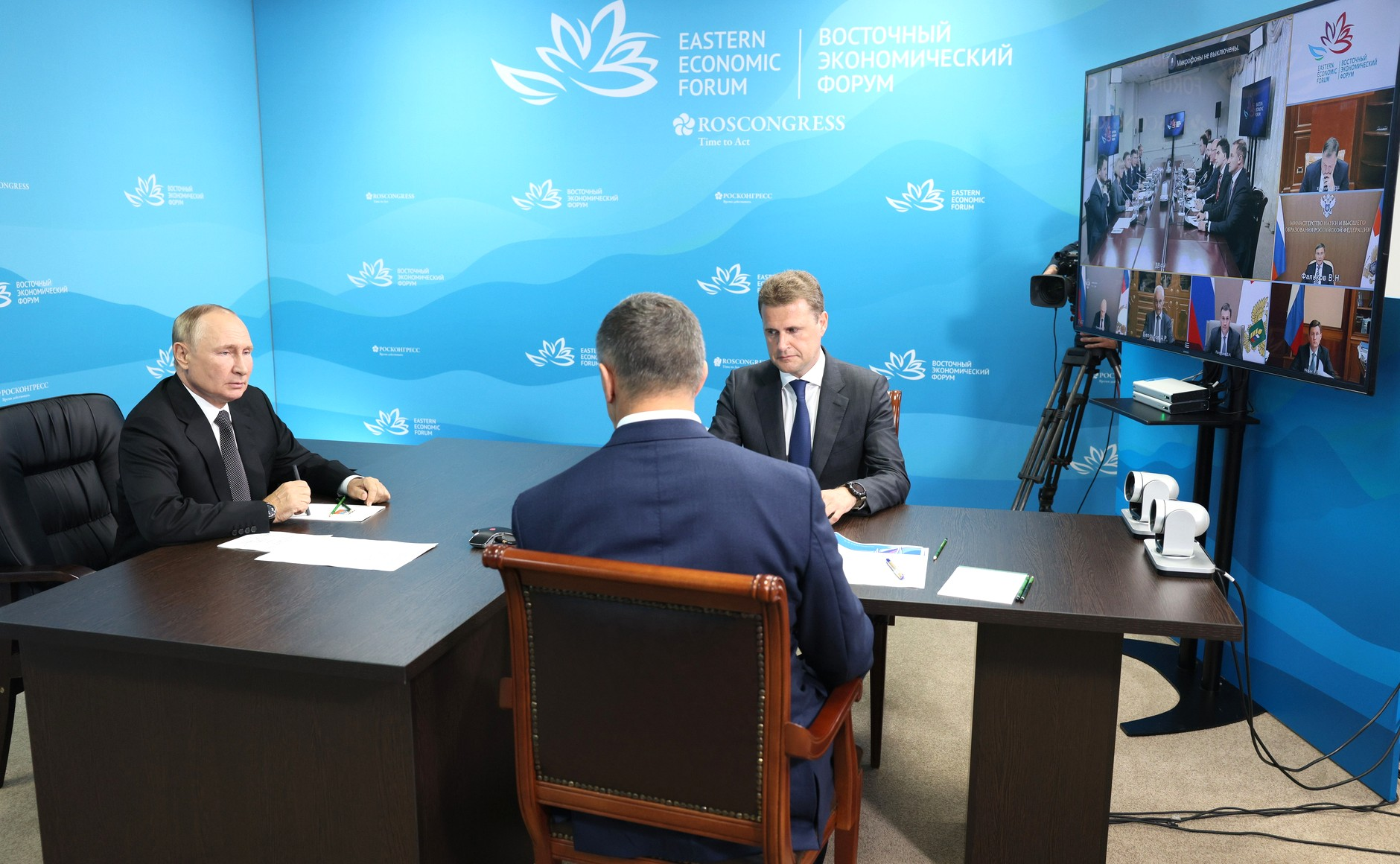
2022 Forum: President of Russia Vladimir Putin (left) virtually attending the forum

== See also ==
- St. Petersburg International Economic Forum
- World Economic Forum
- Boao Forum for Asia
