= Sergey Koliukh =

Russian politician (born 1960)

Sergey Koliukh Сергей Колиух
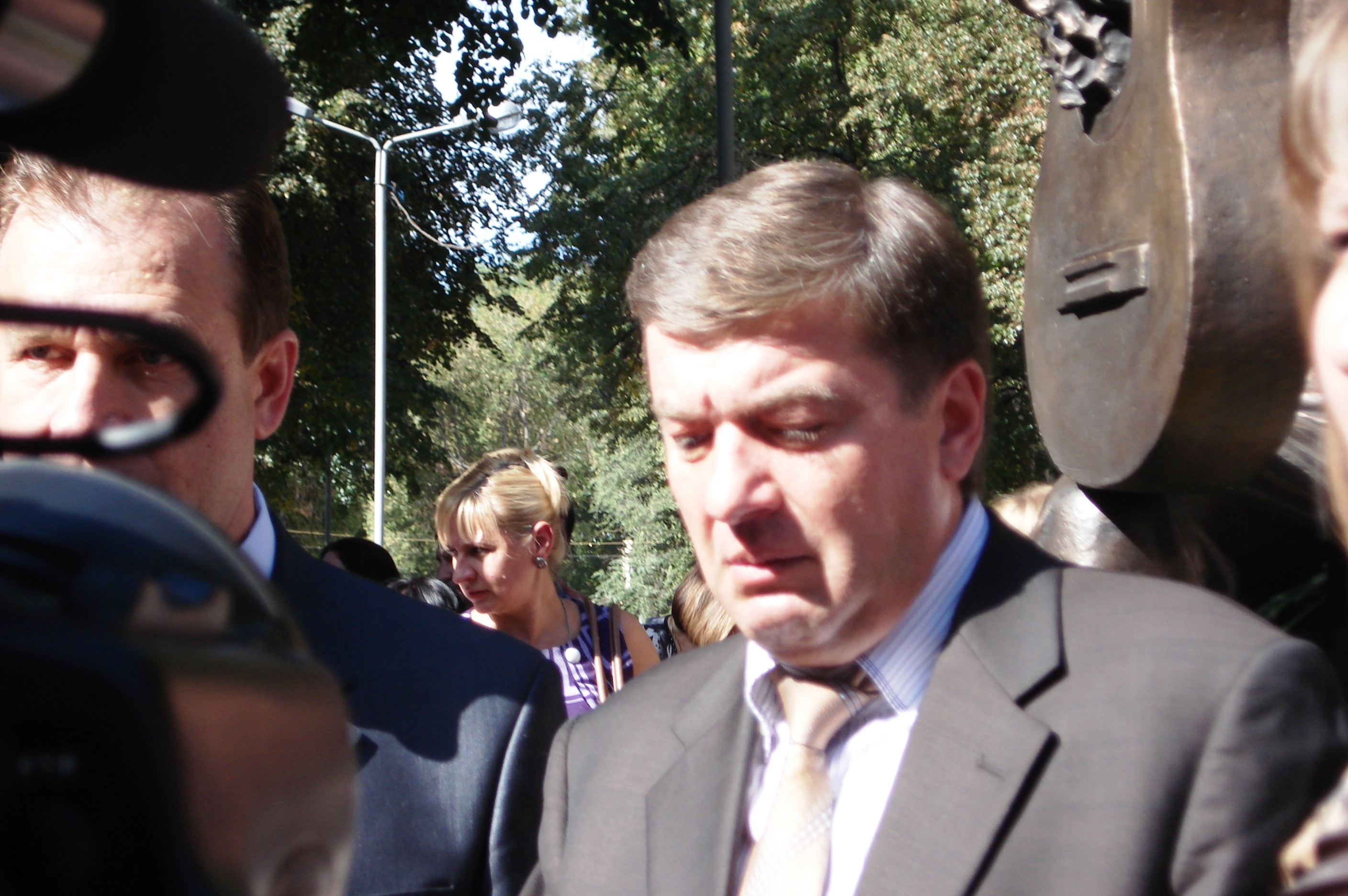

4th Mayor of Voronezh
- In office 11 March 2008 – 13 March 2013
- Preceded by: Boris Skrynnikov
- Succeeded by: Gennady Chernushkin

Personal details
- Born: 27 October 1960 (age 65) Voronezh, Russian SFSR, Soviet Union
- Party: United Russia
- Education: Voronezh Politechnical Institute

Sergey Mikhaylovich Koliukh (Russian: Серге́й Михайлович Колиух) (born 27 October 1960 in Voronezh, Russian SFSR, Soviet Union) is a Russian political figure. He has served as mayor of Voronezh from 11 March 2008 to March 13, 2013.
