= Svetlanskaya Street =

Street in Vladivostok, Russia

Coordinates: 43.1125°N 131.9167°E

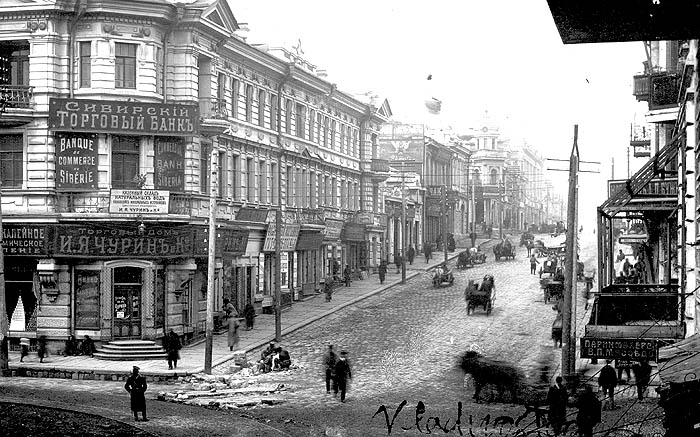
The intersection of Svetlanskaya and Aleutskaya Streets, c. 1910

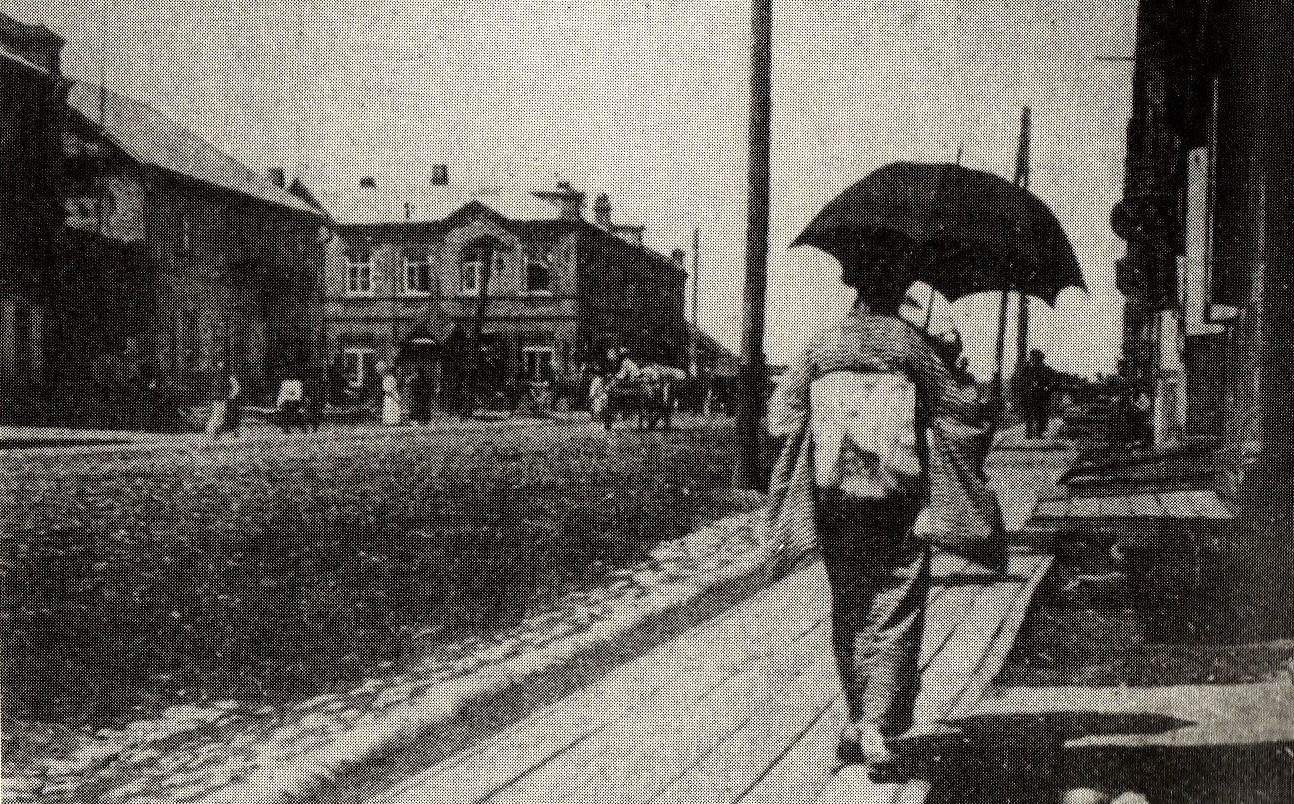
A kimono-clad woman walks down Svetlanskaya Street, c. 1910

Svetlanskaya Street (Russian: Светла́нская у́лица, romanized: Svetlanskaya ulitsa) is a major street in Vladivostok, Russia.

== History ==
Svetlanskaya Street was originally called Amerikanskaya Street after the corvette Amerika, but was renamed in 1873 in honor of the frigate Svetlana which brought Grand Duke Alexei Alexandrovich of Russia to the city for a visit. Most of the wooden buildings erected along the street during the 1860s through the 1880s are no longer standing. Around 1913, there was a great deal of construction around the street; tram service began, and department stores, cinemas, Lutheran and Catholic churches, and a Japanese consulate sprung up. However, there was little new construction along the street during the Soviet period.

The street was renamed Leninskaya in Soviet times; the name "Svetlanskaya" was restored in the 1990s.

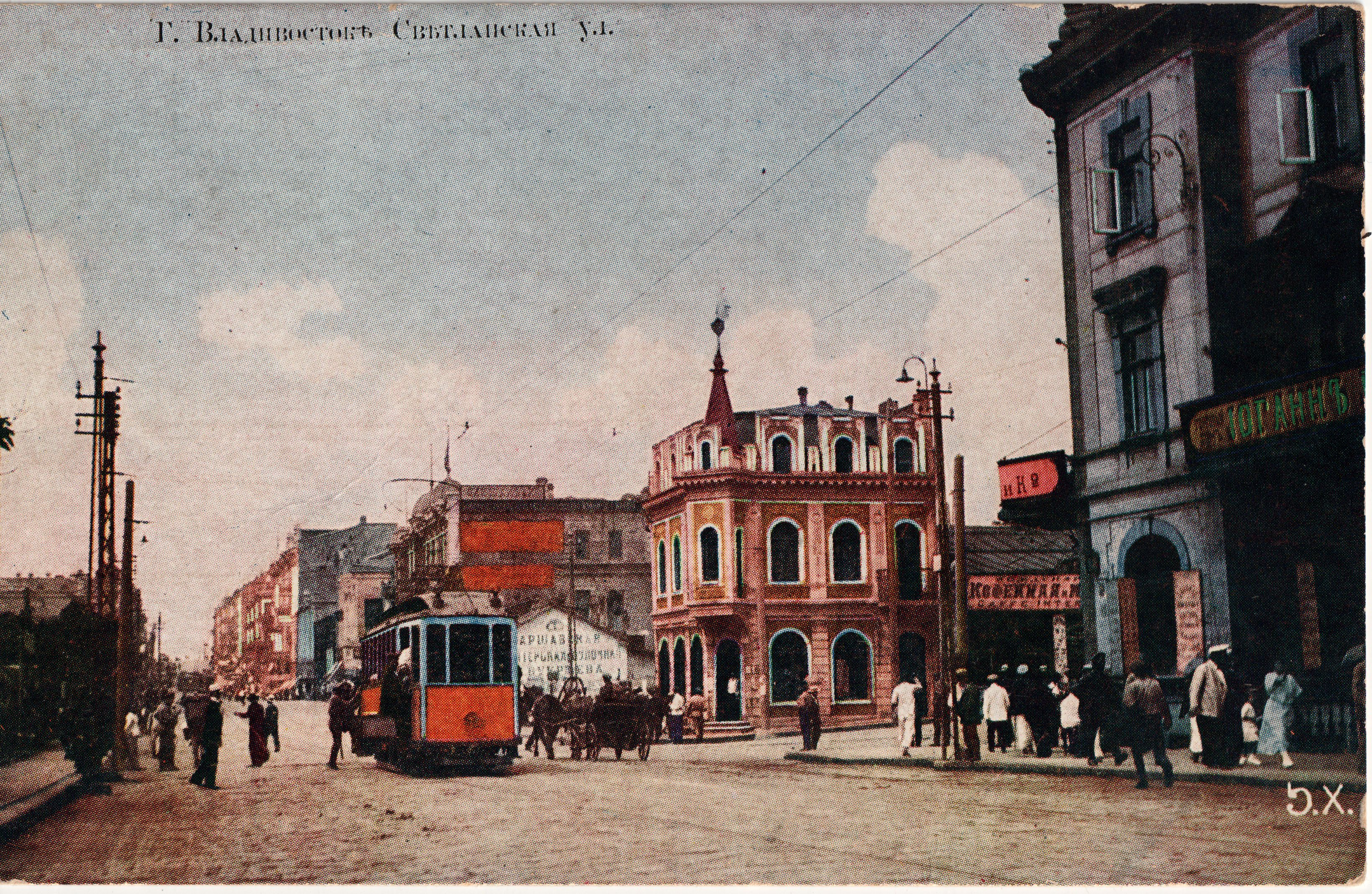
Svetlanskaya St in Vladivostok, early 20th century
