= Centennial Prospect =

Main street in Vladivostok, Russia

Coordinates: 43.1617°N 131.9125°E

The Centennial Avenue (Russian: Проспект Столетия Владивостока, Centennial Prospekt) is the main street in the city of Vladivostok, Russia. The avenue is situated in the neighborhood known as the "Soviet" district. Stretching from north to south, it is the longest street in Vladivostok City. It was built in honor of the 100th anniversary of the city in 1960.

It is connected to the federal highway M-60 by a low-water bridge.

== Known Buildings ==
- The "Soviet" District Court
- Police Station of the Soviet region
- "Stroitel" Stadium

== See also ==
- List of upscale shopping districts
