= Igor Pushkaryov =

Mayor of Vladivostok, Russia

- Игорь Пушкарёв
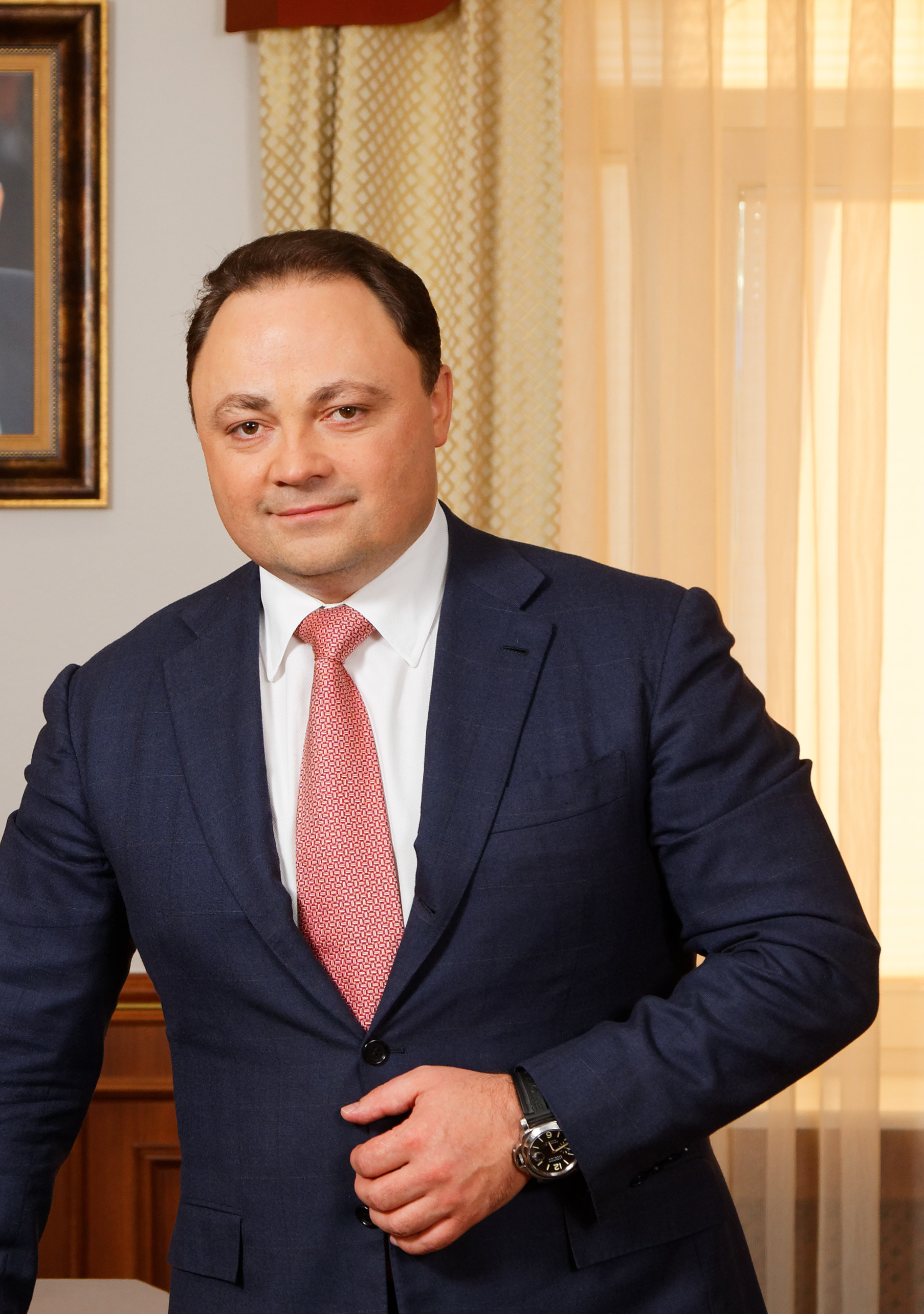
- Pushkaryov in 2016

6th Head of Vladivostok
- In office 18 May 2008 – 3 November 2017
- Preceded by: Vladimir Nikolayev
- Succeeded by: Vitaly Vikeyenko

Member of the Federation Council from the Legislative Authority of Primorsky Krai
- In office 24 November 2004 – 23 May 2008
- Preceded by: Oleg Kozhemyako
- Succeeded by: Viacheslav Fetisov

Personal details
- Born: Igor Sergeyevich Pushkaryov; 17 November 1974 (age 51) Novy Olov, Russia, Soviet Union
- Party: United Russia

Igor Sergeyevich Pushkaryov (Russian: Игорь Сергеевич Пушкарёв; born on 17 November 1974), is a Russian statesman, who served as the 6th head of Vladivostok from 2008 to 2017. He also served as a representative of the Legislative Assembly of the Primorsky Krai in the Federation Council, as the Deputy Chairman of the Commission on Youth Affairs and Sports, and the member of the Budget Committee.

== Biography ==
Igor Pushkarev was born on 17 November 1974 in the village of Novy Olov, Chernyshevsky District, Chita Oblast.

At the university, Pushkarev studied two foreign languages - English and Korean - and worked as a translator in the Korean company Busan, which imported products to Russia, including Chokopai cookies and Doshirak noodles. At the age of 18, he became the executive director of the enterprise. From 1995 to 1997, he was the executive director of LLC Vlad-Kan, which was involved in the import of products.

In 1997, Pushkarev created and headed the Park Group company. In 1998, he became the general director of CJSC Pervomaisky Shipyard, which later became part of the Park Group. Then Park Group (for the money of the Baring Vostok Capital fund) bought out its cement enterprises from Alfa Group.

In 1999, he graduated from the Vladivostok Institute of International Relations of the Far Eastern State University with a degree in International Economics.

He is a Candidate of Law as of 2000, where he defended his dissertation at RUDN University on the topic “International Legal Issues of the Asia-Pacific Economic Cooperation Forum” under the guidance of Aslan Abashidze, Head of the Department of International Law of RUDN University, Member of the Expert Council of the Higher Attestation Commission under the Ministry of Education and Science of Russia in Law.

In 2000, Pushkarev became the general director of Spasskcement OJSC. Gradually, the "Park Group" included Teploozersky Tsemkombinat OJSC, Crushing and Screening Plant JSC, Vladivostok Buto-Crushed Stone Plant JSC, Teploozersky Cement Plant JSC, Spassky Asbestos-Cement Products Plant JSC. Enterprises-manufacturers of building materials later took shape and moved to the management company "Vostokcement". The same year, Pushkaryov was elected to the city council of the city of Spassk-Dalny, where he became deputy chairman of the Duma.

In December 2001, he was elected in constituency No. 24 as a member of the Legislative Assembly of Primorsky Krai of the III convocation. In June 2002, he has served as deputy chairman of the Legislative Assembly. In that same year, Pushkaryov has been the chairman of the Board of Directors of Park Group Management Company LLC.

On 24 November 2004, a week after his 30th birthday, Pushkaryov became a representative of the Primorsky Krai on Legislative Authority in the Federation Council. He became the youngest senator in the history of Russia. The powers were renewed on 27 December 2006. He was a member of the Committee of the Federation Council on the budget, chairman of the subcommittee on customs and tariff regulation, deputy chairman of the Commission of the Federation Council on youth and sports.

On 18 May 2008, he was elected head of the administration of Vladivostok. On 30 May, he was sworn into office.

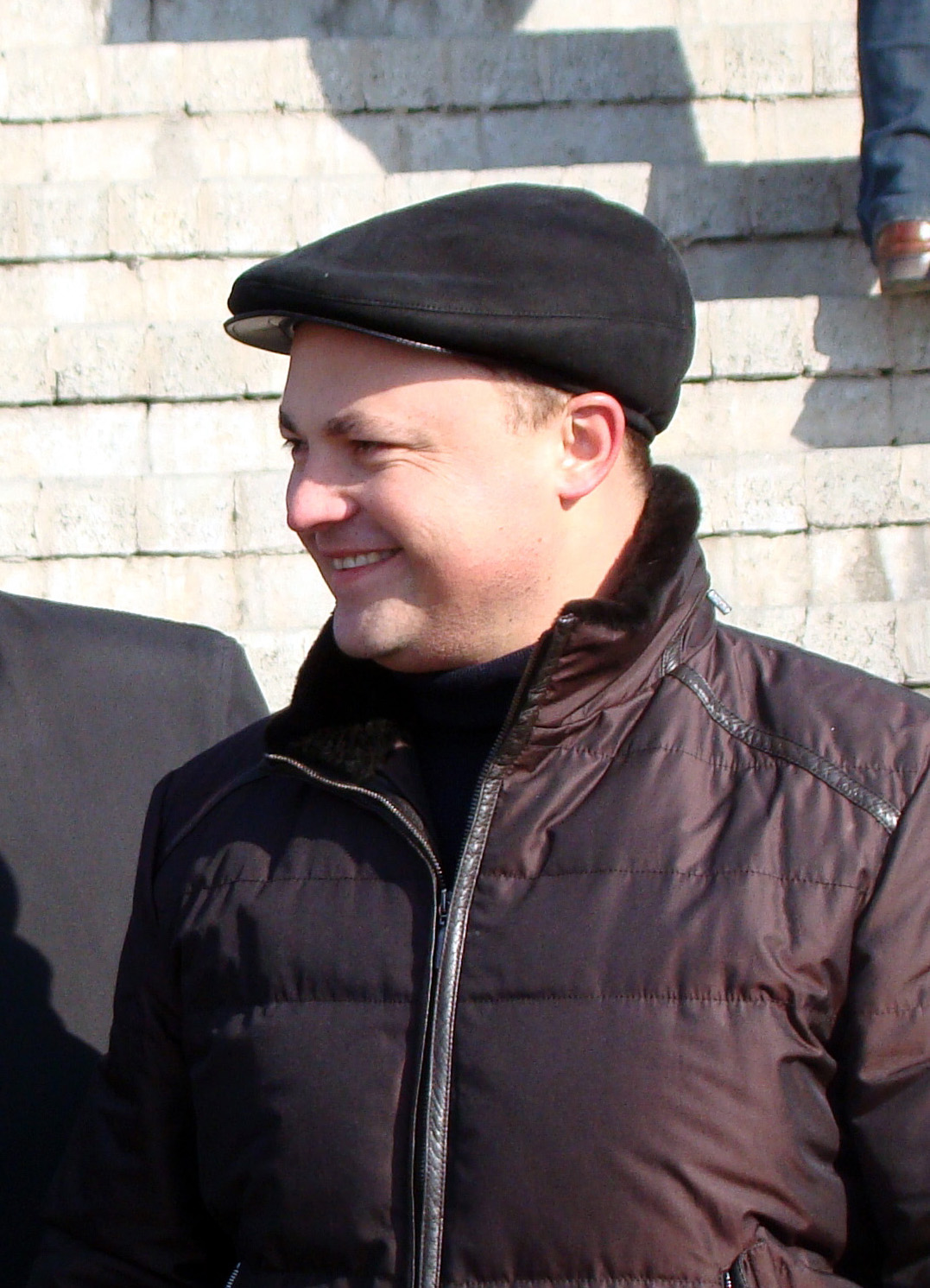
Pushkaryov at a rally in support of the Russian government's anti-crisis measures on 1 February 2009

In 2013, he was reelected for a second term with 59.45% of the votes, in the United Russia party.

As mayor, Pushkaryov devoted his first years to preparing for APEC-2012: the reconstruction and expansion of roads, the construction of bridges, and the FEFU campus. In addition to the general improvement and construction of kindergartens, Pushkaryov's administration was remembered for the reform of urban transport. Pushkaryov radically changed the traffic pattern in Vladivostok by introducing a looped one-way traffic in the city center. Under him, trolleybus and tram traffic was reduced, but the fleet of buses was updated.

On 5 June 2014, he was awarded the medal of the public organization "Russian Municipal Academy" "For Contribution to the Development and Establishment of Local Self-Government".

After being elected mayor of Vladivostok, the media and politicians attributed gubernatorial ambitions to Pushkaryov. According to the recollection of colleagues, between Pushkarev and the governor Vladimir Miklushevsky there were difficult relations from the very beginning: the regional television criticized Pushkaryov, and the mayor published criticism of the governor in controlled media. The conflict escalated before the elections to the Legislative Assembly in the fall of 2016, as inside the United Russia party, the teams of mayors and governors fought for the same mandates. It is believed that after a visit to Moscow, Miklushevsky was able to enlist the support of the security forces in a conflict with the mayor.

=== Criminal prosecution ===
On 1 June 2016, Pushkaryov was arrested in Vladivostok. Immediately after the arrest, United Russia suspended Pushkaryov's membership. On the day of the arrest, officers of the FSB department for Primorsky Krai and the central office of the Investigative Committee conducted searches at several addresses at once - in the building of the city administration, the mayor's country mansion and the offices of companies controlled by his family. On 2 June, Pushkaryo was taken to Moscow and placed in a pre-trial detention center. Together with Pushkaryv, Andrey Lushnikov, the head of the municipal enterprise Roads of Vladivostok, was also detained, and on 24 June, Andrey Pushkaryov, Igor's brother, who until 2015 headed Vostokcement LLC, was also detained.

On 9 March 2017, by decision of the Basmanny District Court of Moscow, he was temporarily removed from the post of head of Vladivostok. On 3 November 2017, Pushkaryov voluntarily resigned.

On 20 October 2017, the Prosecutor General's Office approved the indictment and demanded that the criminal case be transferred from Primorye. On 15 November 2017, the Supreme Court of the Russia ruled to change the territorial jurisdiction of the criminal case, transferring the documents to the Tverskoy Court of Moscow.

The accusation of the ICR basically repeated the results of the audit of the Federal Antimonopoly Service in the Primorsky Krai, published in September 2015. The FAS believed that Pushkaryov used his position to conclude unfavorable municipal contracts for the purchase of asphalt, concrete and crushed stone. However, the decision of the antimonopoly service was later canceled in the Primorsky Krai Arbitration Court as unfounded and illegal. Then the court came to the conclusion that MUP "Roads of Vladivostok" from 2011 to 2015 won 135 contracts out of 426, becoming the winner in 30 percent of cases, and not 80 percent, as stated by the FAS. The court also noted that in Vladivostok there are no alternative suppliers of inert building materials for the needs of the municipality, capable of providing the necessary volumes at comparable prices.

Initially, the investigation claimed that the affected party was the mayor's office of the city. When the mayor's office did not recognize the damage, the investigation considered that the losses of 143.6 million were incurred by the municipal enterprise Roads of Vladivostok. After the MUP also proved that there was no damage, the Prosecutor General's Office itself filed a civil suit over the damage. Also, the basis of the accusation on the part of the ICR was a judicial construction and technical expertise from the Primorsky RCCS, which, according to the charter, does not engage in expertise and only compares prices and does not assess the damage. On behalf of the defense, four independent experts appeared in court, and all of them came to the conclusion that the cost of materials supplied to the city by Vostokcement enterprises was, on average, the same or lower than the average market for the region.

Pushkaryov's defense noted that, in principle, there could be no damage to the municipality, since the Vostokcement group of companies forgave the budget debts of 962 million rubles for the supply of building materials that were needed in preparation for Vladivostok for the APEC summit in 2012. This has been officially confirmed by the mayor's office.

It is quite clear to me that I am not being judged because I have committed any crimes. The investigation itself did not hide the fact that I ended up behind bars as a result of criticism of the former governor of the Primorsky Krai, Vladimir Miklushevsky. The result of this critique was a long political conflict... which came to a head in April 2016 when I won the regional primaries. Despite the fact that Miklushevsky has already been dismissed, the inertia of the law enforcement system, which, as you know, will never admit its mistakes, is so great that I have been in custody for almost three years on completely trumped-up charges.

— Pushkaryov on linking it to a long-standing conflict with Governor Miklushevsky,

On 9 April 2019, the Tverskoy Court of Moscow found Pushkaryov guilty of accepting a bribe on an especially large scale (part 6 of article 290 of the Criminal Code of the Russian Federation), abuse of power (part 3 of article 285 of the Criminal Code of the Russian Federation) and commercial bribery (paragraph "a" » part 2 article 204 of the Criminal Code of the Russian Federation). He was sentenced to 15 years in a strict regime colony. Pushkarev had to pay another 143 million rubles in a civil lawsuit filed by the Prosecutor General's Office in favor of the Vladivostok Roads enterprise.».

After the verdict, Pushkaryov said: “I consciously took risks managing the companies that belong to me through my family members, because otherwise I would not be able to achieve the goals that I set for myself after being elected as the head of the city. I spent my personal funds and the funds of my family for the good of the city.”

In December 2019, after three years of imprisonment in the Matrosskaya Tishina pre-trial detention center, Pushkaryov was transferred to Primorye to serve his sentence.

In January 2020, the Prosecutor General's Office decided to recover 3 billion 281 million rubles, unjustified income from the Pushkarev brothers, Lushnikov and enterprises belonging to the Vostokcement group. As an interim measure, the property of several companies was arrested. Later, the amount of claims was reduced to 1.452 billion rubles. On 6 March 2020, the Sovetsky District Court of Vladivostok fully satisfied the claim of the Prosecutor General's Office.

In June 2020, on the proposal of the Prosecutor General's Office, Pushkayov was sent to serve his sentence from correctional colony No. 33 in Spassk-Dalniy in Primorye to another region.

At the end of 2021, Vostokcement became the largest cement producer in the Far Eastern Federal District. The vertically integrated industrial group included three full-cycle cement enterprises (with a total capacity of 4.3 million tons of cement per year) and four enterprises for the extraction and processing of non-metallic materials in the Primorsky Krai, the Jewish Autonomous Oblast and the Sakha Republic (Yakutia).

On 17 July 2022, Igor Pushkarev was sentenced to an additional 3 months in prison in a criminal case, in which he was charged with the development of municipal and public transport to the detriment of commercial carriers.

== Family ==
He is married to Natalya Pushkareyova and has three sons: Pavel (born in 1996), Aleksei (2002) and Andrei (born in 2012).
