= Novy Olov =

Novy Olov Новый Олов
- Selo
- Location within Zabaykalsky Krai Location within Russia
- Coordinates: 52°36′N 116°31′E
- Country: Russia
- Region: Zabaykalsky Krai
- District: Chernyshevsky District
- Time zone: UTC+9:00

Novy Olov (Russian: Новый Олов) is a rural locality (a selo) in Chernyshevsky District, Zabaykalsky Krai, Russia. Population: 281 (2021 census); 328 (2010 census); There are 3 streets in this selo.

== Geography ==
This rural locality is located 35 km from Chernyshevsk (the district's administrative centre), 213 km from Chita (capital of Zabaykalsky Krai) and 5,340 km from Moscow. Kadaya is the nearest rural locality.
