= Far Eastern Federal University =

University in Russia

- Дальневосточный федеральный университет
- University main campus in Russky Island
- Motto: Striving for Success
- Established: 1899; 127 years ago
- President: Boris Nikolaevich Korobets
- Students: 41,000
- Location: Vladivostok, Primorsky Krai, Russia; 43°01′27″N 131°53′37″E
- Website: http://dvfu.ru/en/
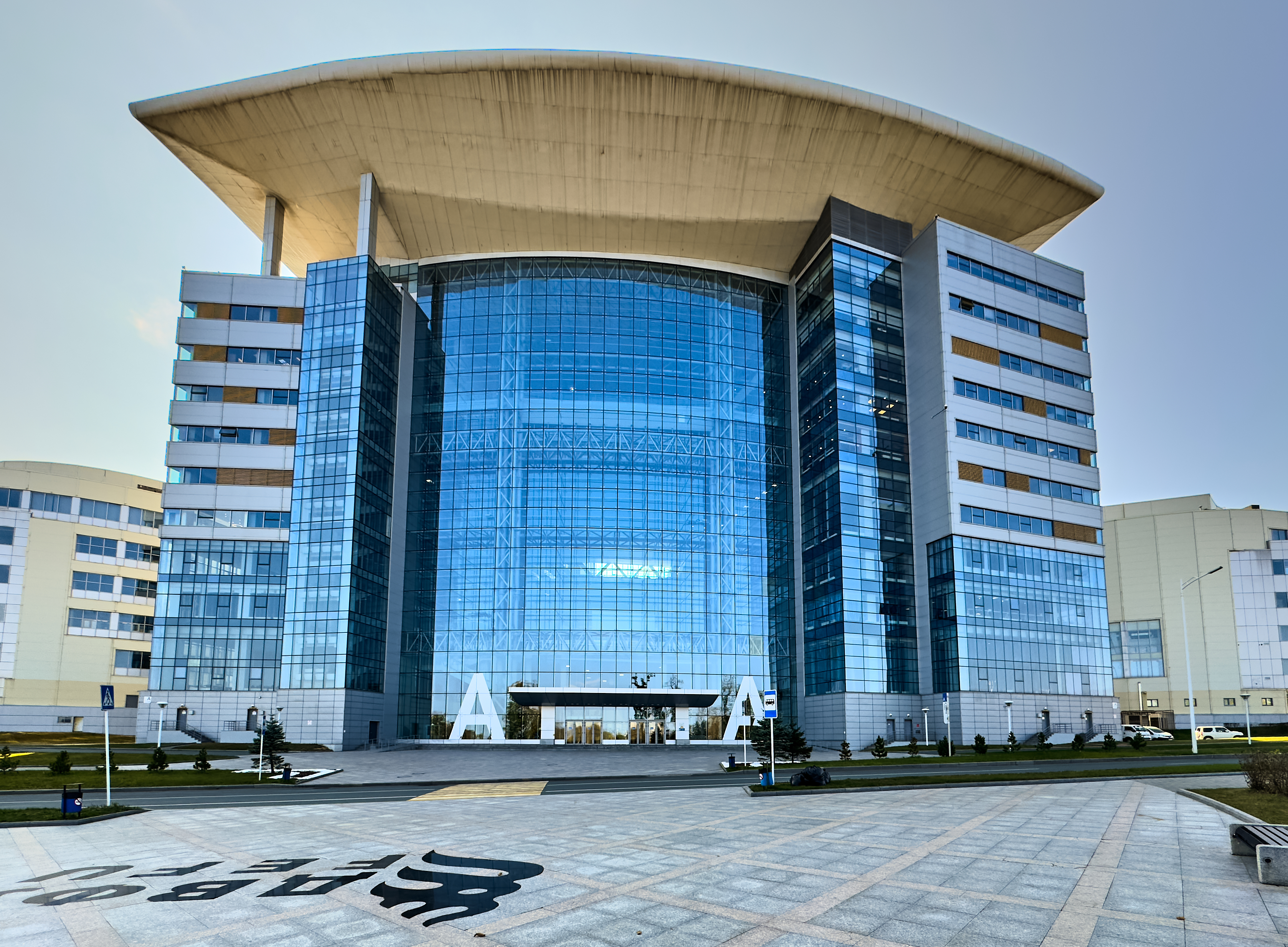

University rankings

Global – Overall
- QS World: 731–740 (2026)

Regional – Overall
- QS Emerging Europe and Central Asia: 97 (2022)

Far Eastern Federal University (FEFU; Russian: Дальневосто́чный федера́льный университе́т, romanized: Dalnevostochny federalny universitet) is a public university in Vladivostok, Primorsky Krai, Russia.

In 2023 the university was ranked #434 by QS World University Rankings and among the 100 best universities by Forbes.

== History ==
FEFU was established in 1899 during the Russian Empire era by a special order of Tsar Nicholas II as the Eastern Institute (Восточный институт) as a higher education institution specializing in oriental studies and training for administrative, commercial and industrial institutions in the Far East. The main goal of the university was to train personnel for administrative, commercial and industrial institutions in the East Asian part of Russia and adjacent states. The main courses were the languages: Chinese, Japanese, Manchu, Korean and Mongolian, history and political organization of the Eastern states, jurisprudence etc. The university was reformed into the State Far Eastern University by Far Eastern Republic authorities in 1920 during the Russian Civil War, until it was closed in the 1930s under Joseph Stalin. It was reinstated in 1956 as Far Eastern State University by the Council of Ministers of the USSR, two years after Nikita Khrushchev visited Vladivostok.

=== 21st century ===
In 2000, its official English exonym was changed to Far Eastern National University; however, the name in Russian remained unchanged and references to the university under its old name were common. In 2008, the university was reformed again by presidential decree into its current form, officially changing the name to Far Eastern Federal University and a new purpose-built campus planned. The university became a merger of four previously existing universities, the Far Eastern National University (FENU), the Far Eastern State Technical University (FESTU), Pacific State University of Economics (TSUE) and the Ussuriysk State Pedagogical Institute (USPI).

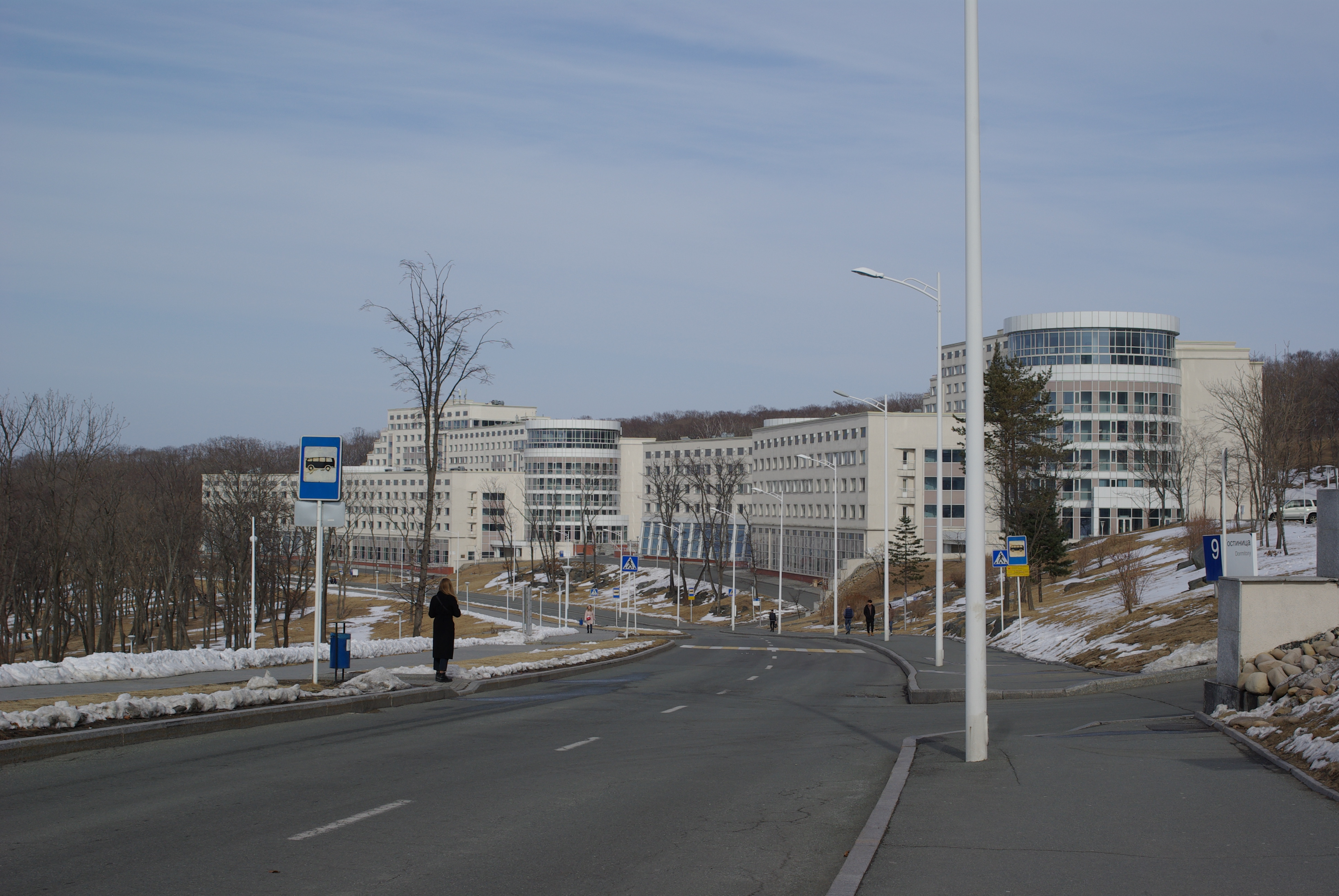
Campus FEFU in Russky island (2019)

In 2013, FEFU opened a new campus in the Russky Island area of Vladivostok after its buildings hosted the 2012 APEC summit. The campus serves FEFU's 41,000 students, and hosts the annual Eastern Economic Forum. FEFU is a participant of the Project 5-100 state program of the Russian Ministry of Education and Science.

== Academics ==
Far Eastern Federal University consists of:

- Institute of Asian Studies (known before as Oriental Institute – School of Regional and International Studies)
- School of Economics and Management
- School of Education
- Advance Engineering School "Institute of Biotechnology, Bioengineering and Food Systems"
- School of Arts and Humanities
- School of Law
- School of Medicine and Life Sciences
- Institute of the World Ocean
- Institute of Mathematics and Computer Technologies
- Institute of High Technologies and Advanced Materials

== Ratings, accreditation, and funding ==
In 2023 the university was ranked #1,578 in Best Global Universities by U.S. News & World Report, and in 2023 it was ranked #1,880 by Center for World University Rankings. According to QS World University Rankings of 2023, Far Eastern Federal University ranks #15 in Russia and #434 in the world.

== International ==
FEFU offers international programs combining Internet and face-to-face modes of learning. However, with the war Russia launched against Ukraine in 2022, many of these partnerships are now paused or closed.

The university is a member of the University of the Arctic. UArctic is an international cooperative network based in the Circumpolar Arctic region, consisting of more than 200 universities, colleges, and other organizations with an interest in promoting education and research in the Arctic region. The collaboration has been paused after the beginning of the Russo-Ukrainian War in 2022.

A dual degree program with University of Maryland University College (UMUC), USA, started in 1991 as a classical face-to-face program. In 1999 it became one of the first online dual degree programs in Russia. By October 2003, 265 FEFU students graduated from UMUC with bachelor's degrees in Business and Management, along with their Russian university degrees. Since 1999, UMUC accepts 90 FEFU credits of 120 credits total, required for the undergraduate degree, and offers ten online courses for the remaining 30 credits. Another dual degree program with University of Southern Queensland (USQ), Australia, started in 2001. USQ participates in a number of such programs, but FENU was its first Russian university affiliate.

=== Far Eastern Federal University Branch in Hakodate ===
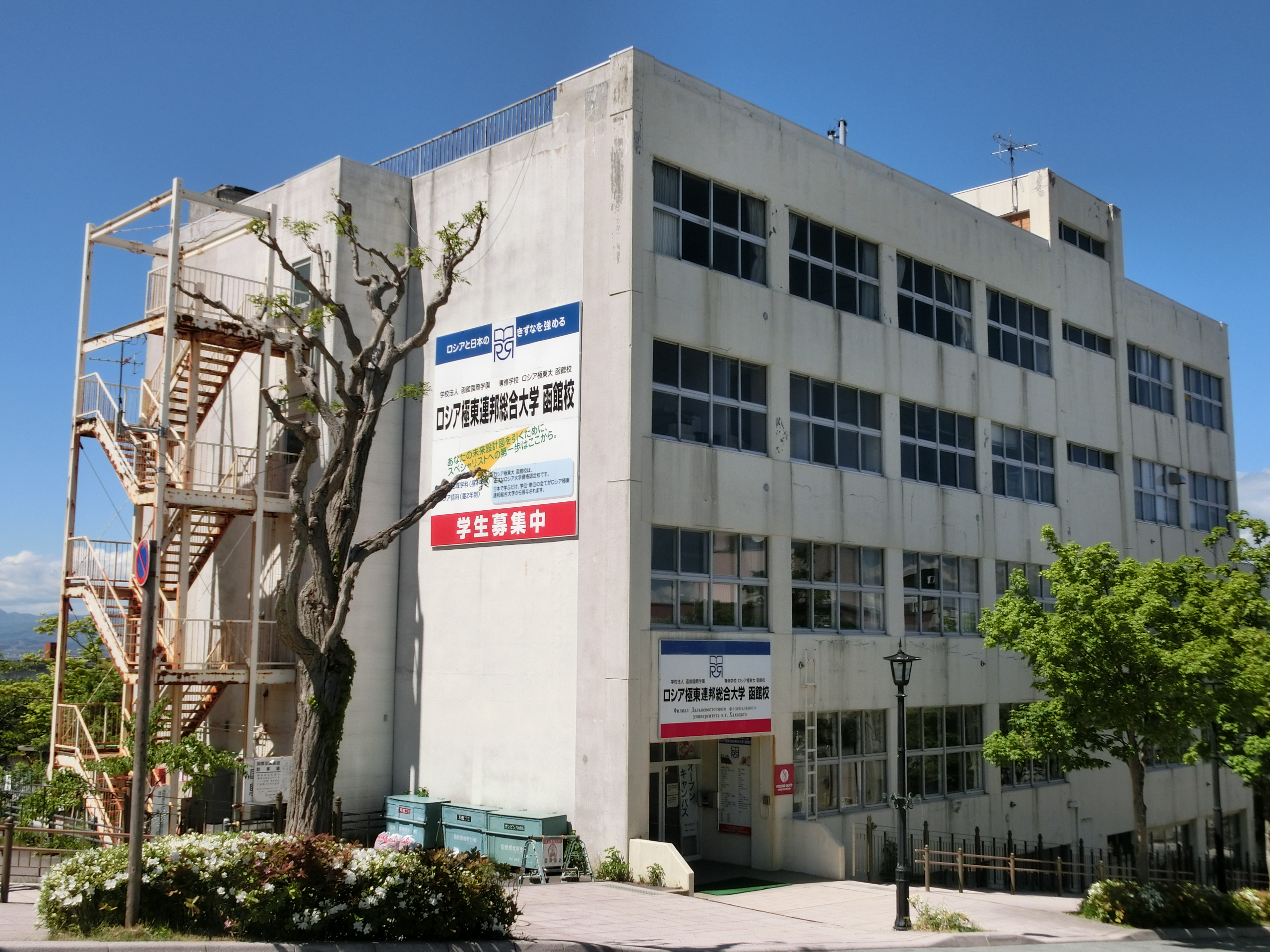
Building of the Far Eastern Federal University Branch in Hakodate

The University has a Japan Campus of Foreign Universities branch in Hakodate (Japan) called the Far Eastern Federal University Branch in Hakodate (Филиал Дальневосточного Федерального Университета в г. Хакодатэ; ロシア極東連邦総合大学 函館校). It was opened in 1994 with the assistance of the city of Hakodate and public organizations. The main focus is on the study of the Russian language. Students also study Russian economics, history, literature and geography. The Hakodate branch, however, is set to close in 2025 due to declining enrollment following the war against Ukraine in 2022.

=== Partner institutions ===
Australia
University of Southern Queensland
Malaysia
Universiti Tunku Abdul Rahman
United States
University of Maryland Global Campus

== Notable alumni ==
- Mikhail Kim, Soviet hydraulic engineer and geophysicist
- Leonid Korotkov
- Ilya Lagutenko
- Roman Rubanov
