= Far Eastern State Technical University =

University in Russia

Coordinates: 43.1156°N 131.9011°E

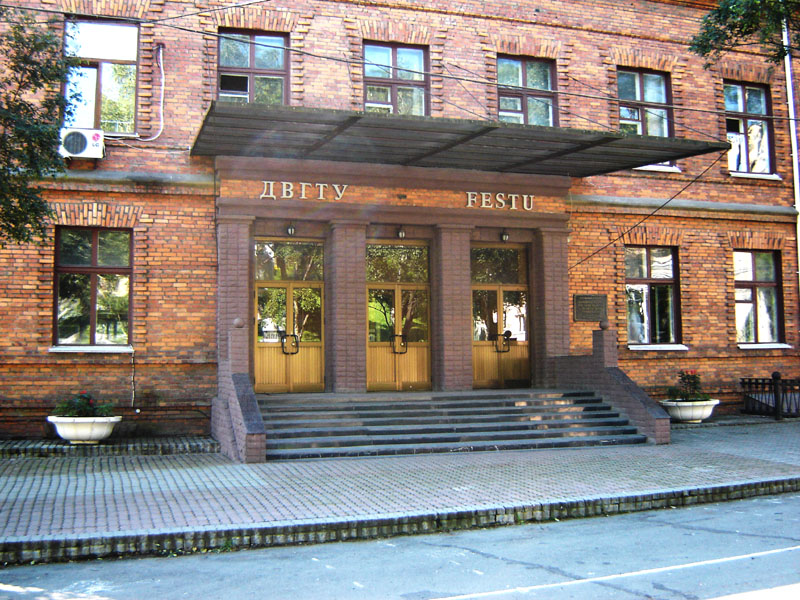
The central entrance to the University

Far Eastern State Technical University (FESTU) (Russian: Дальневосто́чный госуда́рственный техни́ческий университе́т, ДВГТУ) was a university located in Vladivostok, Russia. It was established on February 20, 1930 as Far Eastern Politechnical Institute (Дальневосточный политехнический институт (ДВПИ)). It was granted the university status in 1992. In 2010 it merged into the Far Eastern Federal University.

FESTU was not a successor of Oriental Institute as it claimed to be. In the dispute, court denied its claims and reassured Far Eastern Federal University as the only successor.

== Partner universities ==
- Ching Yun University, Taiwan
