= Vladimir Nikolayev (politician) =

Russian politician

- Владимир Николаев

5th Mayor of Vladivostok
- In office 22 July 2004 – 20 February 2008
- Preceded by: Yury Kopylov
- Succeeded by: Igor Pushkaryov

Personal details
- Born: 10 October 1973 (age 52) Vladivostok, Russian SFSR, Soviet Union
- Party: United Russia (2003-2009)

Vladimir Viktorich Nikolayev (Russian: Владимир Викторович Николаев; born 10 October 1973) is a Russian politician accused of membership in the Russian Mafia. He was a member of former Russian president Vladimir Putin's governing party United Russia; the mayor of Vladivostok; and the owner of seafood, meat, and timber-processing companies. Nikolayev reached his position as mayor when his opponent for the position "tripped" on a grenade left outside his office, killing him.

The city court of Vladivostok removed Nikolayev from his post as the city's mayor in March 2007. Immediately after the decision was made, Nikolayev gave a press conference, in which he called the case against him a "sheer falsification" and "someone’s paid order". In a press statement, the prosecutor's office of Russian federal subject Primorsky Krai announced, "Vladimir Nikolayev called the criminal case initiated against him by prosecutors as a paid and ordered deal and his speech was broadcast by all local and many federal news agencies. In this respect Primorye’s prosecutor’s office asks the General prosecutor’s office to make a legal assessment of Nikolayev’s remarks concerning the case against him."

Originally, Primorsky Krai launched a criminal investigation against Nikolayev and charged him with embezzlement. It also appealed to the city court, requesting that Nikolayev's duties as city mayor be halted while the investigation was ongoing. Soon after, the city court temporarily dismissed Nikolayev from his office, stating, "Nikolayev should not have the power to influence his subordinates during an investigation carried out against him."

In 2012, he was acquitted.
