= Pacific State Medical University =

University in Vladivostok, Russia

- Тихоокеанский государственный медицинский университет
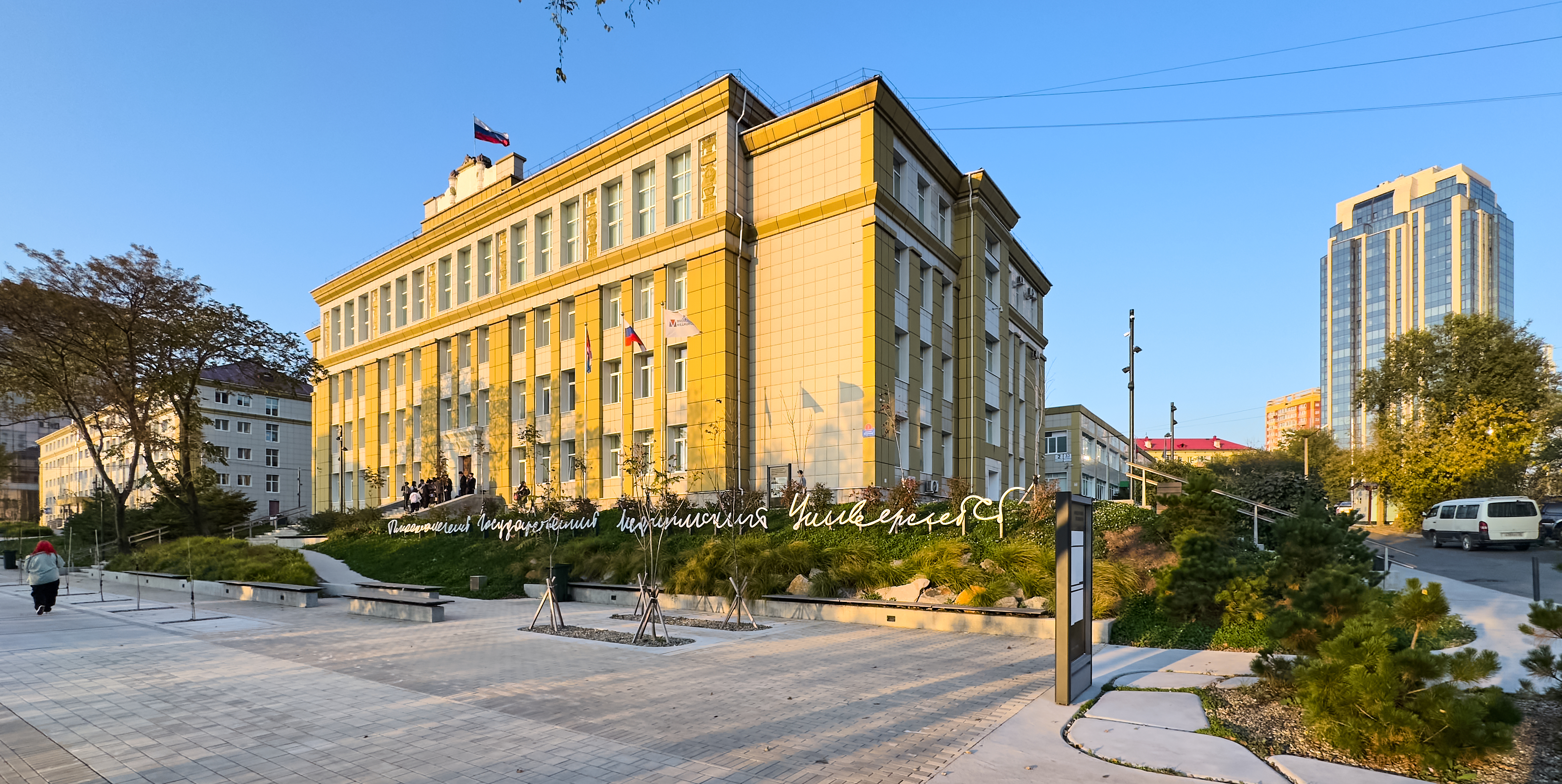
- Motto: Debes, Ergo Potes (You Must, so you Can)
- Established: 1958
- Rector: Valentin Shumatov (in Russian)
- Academic staff: 1000
- Students: 15,000+
- Address: 690990, Ostryakov Avenue, 2, Vladivostok, Russia; 43°7′51″N 131°54′7″E
- Website: http://www.tgmu.ru/

Pacific State Medical University (Russian: Тихоокеанский государственный медицинский университет), formerly known as VSMU (Vladivostok State Medical University) is a medical university in Vladivostok in the Russian Far East.

== History ==
At the beginning, since 1956 VSMU was the Medical Faculty of the Far Eastern State University, but in 2 years it became Vladivostok State Medical Institute (VSMU). The first postgraduate program was opened in 1961 in the Department of Biochemistry. The fifth scientific conference of VSMI was held in 1965. In 1968, the Higher Attestation Commission (HAC) Board authorized VSMI to form a dissertation council for the defense of candidate dissertations in the specialities of Anatomy, Histology, Nervous diseases, Pharmacology, Microbiology, Therapy and Surgery.

In 1995 the institute received university status. The university received its state accreditation certificate as the Federal State Institution "Vladivostok State Medical University" (VSMU). Since 2010, the institution has had the organizational and legal form of the State Budgetary Educational Institution of Higher Professional Education "Vladivostok State Medical University" of the Ministry of Health and Social Development of the Russian Federation (GBOU VPO VSMU). On January 1, 2013, in accordance with an order signed by Minister of Health Veronika Skvortsova, the university was renamed the State Budgetary Educational Institution of Higher Professional Education "Pacific State Medical University" of the Ministry of Health of the Russian Federation (GBOU VPO TSMU).

== Structure ==
The university includes 10 faculties and 67 departments, employing 85 doctors and 285 candidates of science. The university held an internship, residency, graduate school, the system of pre-university training and post-graduate special education improving system.

Faculties of the Pacific State Medical University:

- The Medical Faculty
- The Military Faculty
- The Military Training Center
- The Pediatric Faculty
- The Faculty of Pharmacy
- The Faculty of Medical Prophylactic and Medical Biochemistry
- The Pharmaceutical Faculty
- The Stomatological (dental) Faculty
- The Higher Nursing Education and Social Work Faculty
- The Clinical Psychology Faculty
- The Continuous Medical Education
- The Postgraduate and Further Degree Studies
- Pre-University Training
