= Yevgeny Burachyok =

Russian seaman

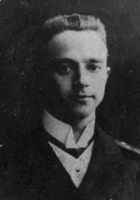
Burachyok c. 1860

Yevgeny Stepanovich Burachyok (Russian: Евге́ний Степа́нович Бурачёк; last name also spelled Бурачек, Burachek, or Бурачок, Burachok; January 8 (20 N.S.), 1836 – 1911) was a Russian seaman and the second head of the garrison of the military post of Vladivostok in 1861–1863, who significantly contributed to the post's early development.

Yevgeny Burachyok was born in St. Petersburg in the family of the shipbuilder Stepan Burachyok. At the age of six he entered the Sea Cadet Corps. At this early age Yevgeny was fluent in Russian and German; in later years he also mastered English and Chinese.

On August 11 (23), 1851 Yevgeny became a midshipman of the Sea Cadet Corps and served on the ships of the Baltic Fleet. In 1853, he was promoted to the rank of the warrant officer and in 1856—to the rank of an ensign. In 1859, he was assigned to the clipper Razboynik.

Aboard Razboynik, however, Burachyok discovered that he was strongly susceptible to sea-sickness. In 1860, during Razboynik's voyage from Kronstadt to Nikolayevsk-on-Amur, his sickness progressed to the point where it endangered his life. On June 22 (July 6), 1861, he was forced to disembark in Vladivostok in order to return to Saint Petersburg by land.

At this same time Pyotr Kazakevich, the Governor of Primorskaya Oblast, was facing a dilemma. Vladivostok, founded the year before, needed a commanding officer for its garrison, as warrant officer Nikolay Komarov had been relieved of duty for alcoholism and stealing just two days before Razboynik sailed into the Golden Horn Bay. After assessing Burachyok, Kazakevich found him to be a perfect candidate for the vacant position, as he was an experienced sea officer, had an engineering background, and fluent in Chinese (although later Burachyok discovered that his classical Chinese was incomprehensible to the local Chinese population). Burachyok accepted the offer and assumed the post on July 26 (August 7), 1861 after having recovered from his illness.

Buryachyok's appointment opened a new phase in the development of Vladivostok. After only a year of hard work, by June 1862 the military post grew into a fully functional sea port capable of servicing ocean vessels and was officially granted sea port status. Burachyok also started prospecting Muravyov-Amursky Peninsula, on which Vladivostok is located, for coal deposits. At the time, the Russian Navy was undergoing a conversion from sailing ships to steam ships, and the Siberian Military Flotilla already had several steamboats. Having coal available in Vladivostok greatly increased the port's significance and eliminated the need to purchase coal from Qing China and Japan. After scouting Muravyov-Amursky Peninsula almost in its entirety, two coal deposits were discovered in the vicinity of Vladivostok.

Burachyok also encouraged the formation of the port's civil population by assisting the soldiers and sailors wishing to stay in Vladivostok after completing their service and allotting them land on the hill slopes to build housing. He also encouraged Russian merchants to develop trade in the port.

In 1863, however, Burachyok's old illness returned and he was forced to leave Vladivostok for medical reasons. On February 28 (March 12), 1863, his transfer order was officially signed in St. Petersburg and Buryachyok left for Kronstadt soon after. Later that year, one of the hills in the vicinity of Vladivostok was named after him (Burachok Hill). In April 1863, Burachyok was awarded the Order of Stanislav 3rd Class for his achievements.

Upon his return, Burachyok served in the coastal positions and retired in 1888 in the rank of a rear admiral. He died in 1911 and was interred at the Smolensk Cemetery in St. Petersburg. On July 2, 1988, the remains of Burachyok were moved from the closing Smolensk Cemetery and re-buried at the Naval Cemetery in Vladivostok.

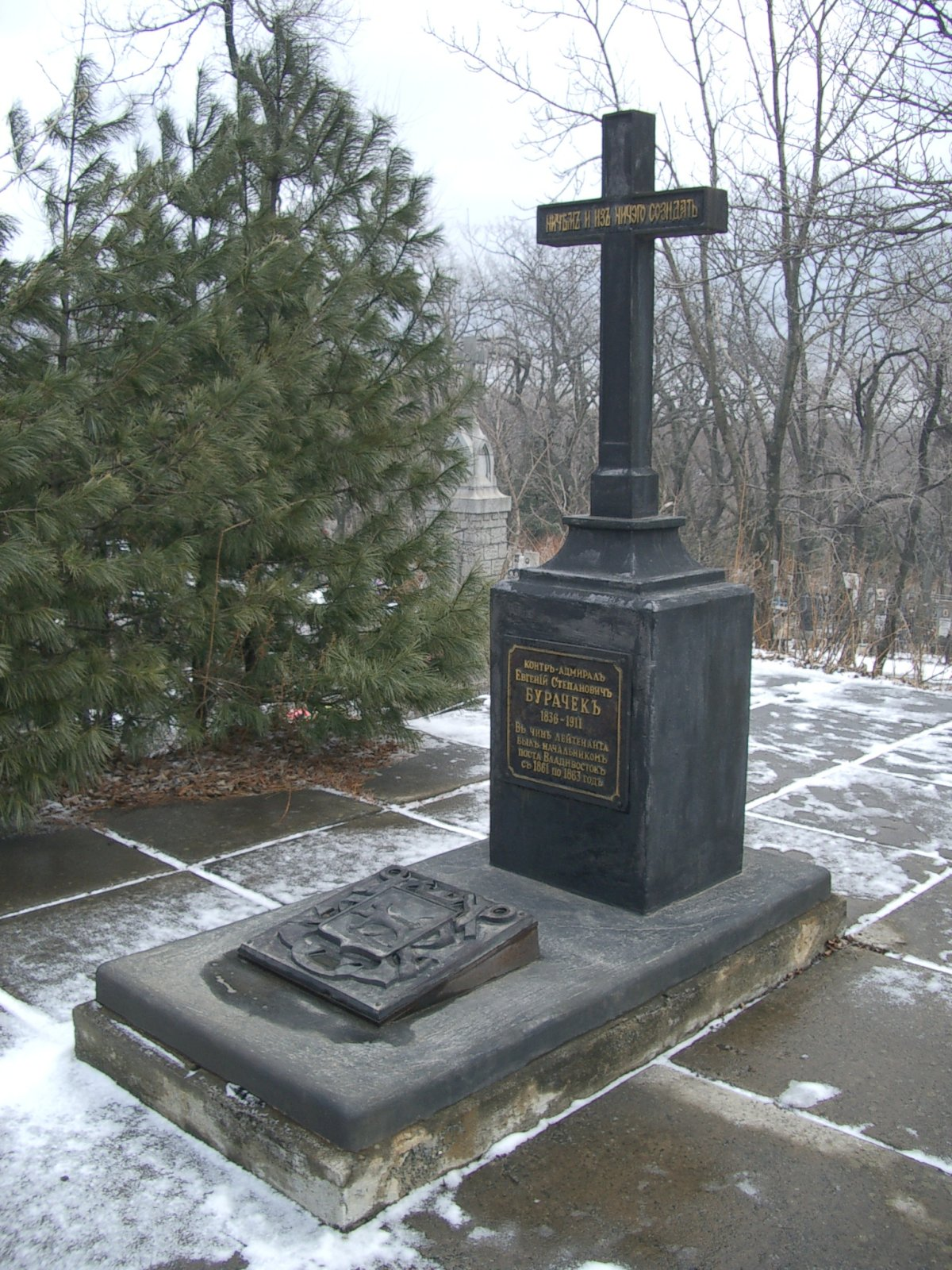
Burachyok's grave at the Naval Cemetery in Vladivostok
