= Nikolay Vasilyevich Komarov =

- Николай Васильевич Комаров
- Born: 1831; Komarovo, Tobolsk Governorate, Russian Empire
- Died: after 1875
- Occupation: Military man

Nikolay Vasilyevich Komarov (Russian: Никола́й Васи́льевич Комаро́в; 1831 – after 1875) was a Russian junior commissioned officer (praporshchik) who is commonly considered to be the founder of the city of Vladivostok.

Little is known about Komarov's youth. He was born in the village of Komarovo, Tobolsk Governorate (now part of Tyumen) into a family of government peasants and graduated from Omsk Army Commissioned Officers College, after which he was assigned to a company sent to the Far East to build new outposts. In 1858, his company was quartered in Khabarovsk, in 1859—in Sofiysk, and in 1860—in Nikolayevsk-on-Amur.

On June 20 (July 2 Gregorian style), 1860, the military supply ship Manchzhur under the command of Captain-Lieutenant Alexey Shefner called at the Golden Horn Bay to establish an outpost called Vladivostok. Komarov with twenty-eight soldiers and two non-commissioned officers under his command started construction of military barracks, an officers' house, a kitchen, a warehouse, and a bathhouse. This date is now considered the official date of Vladivostok's founding. On the following day, Komarov was appointed a commanding officer of Vladivostok's garrison, but a year later was relieved from duty for theft and alcoholism (according to Major Khitrovo, who visited Vladivostok with inspections, Komarov often fraternized and drank with soldiers). He was replaced by Yevgeny Burachok, an officer who had to disembark in Vladivostok from the clipper Razboynik for medical reasons. Komarov was soon transferred to the Ussuri River. He retired in 1875 in the rank of poruchik (First Lieutenant) (according to other sources—in the rank of Captain-Engineer).

A street in central Vladivostok (Komarovskaya St.) was named after Nikolay Komarov in 1860. The street was renamed Borodinskaya and later—Geologov, but in 1985 it was again renamed after Komarov (Praporshchik Komarov St.).
