= 31st Infantry Regiment (United States) =

- Coat of arms
- Active: 1916 – present
- Country: United States
- Branch: United States Army
- Type: Infantry
- Garrison/HQ: Fort Drum
- Nicknames: Polar Bears (special designation) "America's Foreign Legion" "Manila's Own Regiment" "The Thirsty First"
- Motto: "Pro Patria" (For Country)
- Engagements: Russian Civil War: Siberian Expedition; Battle of Romanovka; World War II: Battle of Bataan; Bataan Death March; Korean War: Battle of Inchon; Second Battle of Seoul; Battle of Chosin Reservoir; Vietnam War: Tet Offensive; War on terror: War in Afghanistan; Iraq War

Commanders
- Notable commanders: Richard P. Ovenshine; Don C. Faith Jr. Allan D. MacLean; William J. McCaffrey

Insignia
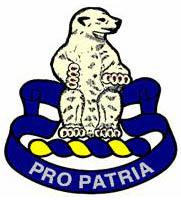
- Distinctive unit insignia

The 31st Infantry Regiment ("Polar Bears") of the United States Army was formed on 13 August 1916, and was part of USAFFE's Philippine Division during World War II. The unit is rare in that it was formed and has spent most of its life on non-American soil.

The regiment is the third to bear the designation; the first was formed for the War of 1812 and disbanded in 1815. The second was created from the 3rd Battalion of the 13th Infantry on 28 July 1866, in the reorganization of the U.S. Army following the American Civil War. The second organization to be called the 31st Infantry was consolidated with its sister regiment the 22nd Infantry (also formed out of the 13th) in an 1869 reorganization. Because the lineage of the previous regiments called the 31st were passed down to their successor units, the current 31st Infantry Regiment does not share their history or honors.

As of 2026 the 4th Battalion, 31st Infantry Regiment is active and assigned to the 2nd Mobile Brigade Combat Team, 10th Mountain Division.

== Organization ==
The third organization called the 31st Infantry Regiment was formed at Fort William McKinley, Philippine Islands on 13 August 1916 using cadre from the 8th, 13th, 15th, and 27th Infantry Regiments. The 1st Battalion was formed at Regan Barracks, the 2nd at Camp McGrath, and the 3rd at Fort William McKinley. It bears the distinction of being the first organization created under expansion of the US Army under the National Defense Act of 1916.

== Russian Civil War ==
During the Russian Revolution, on 13 August 1918, the 31st moved from Manila's tropics to the bitter cold of Siberia as part of the American Expeditionary Force, Siberia. Its mission was to prevent allied war material left on Vladivostok's docks from being looted. The 31st moved from Fort William McKinley to Manila, and there set sail for Vladivostok, Siberia, arriving on 21 August. The regiment was then broken into various detachments and used to guard the Trans-Siberian Railway, as well as 130 km of a branch line leading to the Suchan mines.

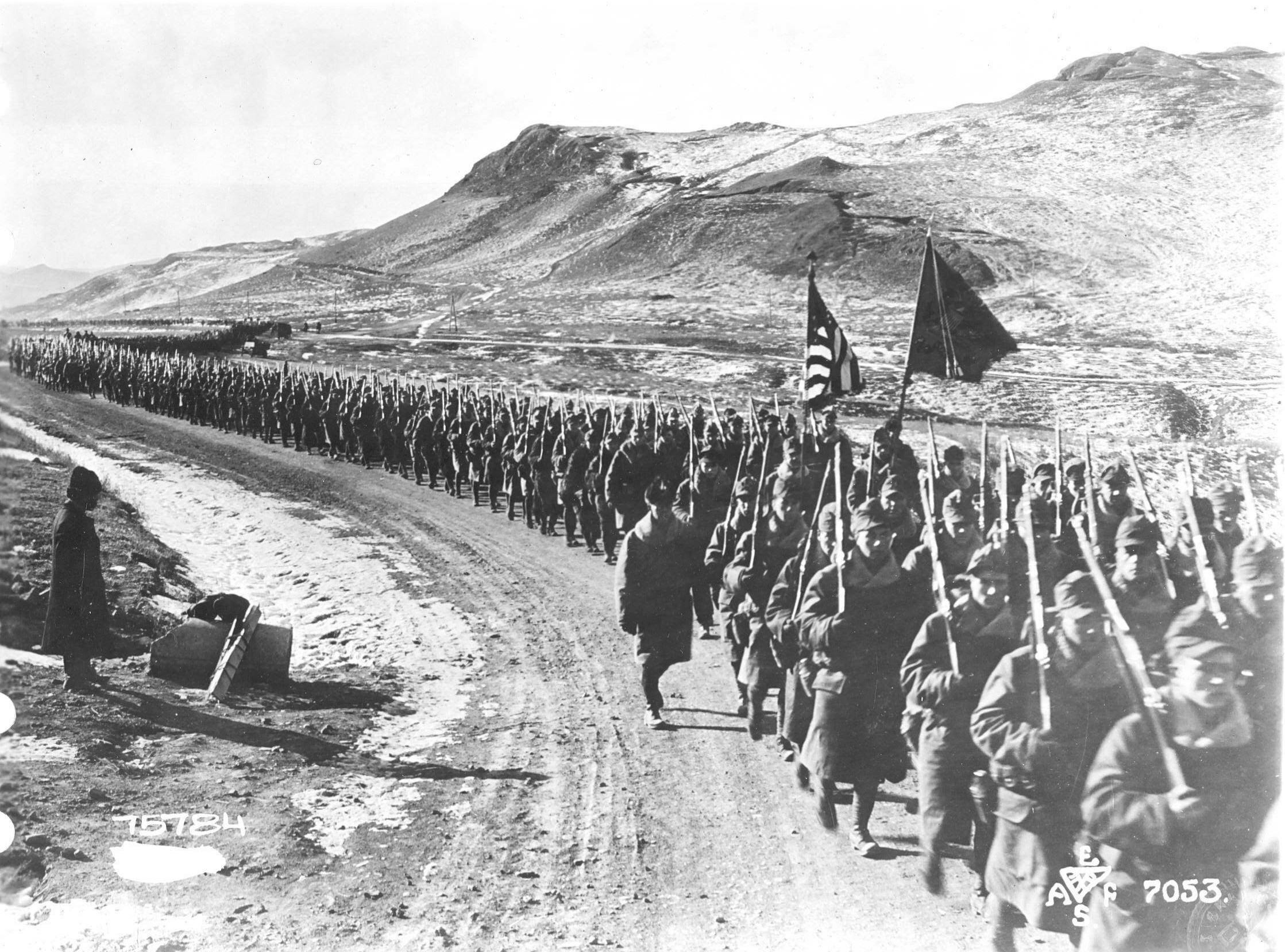
31st Infantry in the field near Vladivostok as part of the American Expeditionary Force Siberia

For the next 2 years, the 31st and its sister, the 27th Infantry Regiment, fought off bands of Red revolutionaries and White counterrevolutionaries that were plundering the Siberian countryside and trying to gain control of the Trans-Siberian Railroad. They also dissuaded their 40,000 Japanese allies from taking control of Russian territory.

The regiment suffered its first battle casualties on 29 August 1918, in action near Ugolnaya. During the Siberian deployment, 30 men of the 31st Infantry were killed, and some 60 men were wounded in action. In addition, a large number of troops lost limbs due to frostbite. During this deployment, the regiment recommended one Medal of Honor and 15 Distinguished Service Crosses. For its service in Siberia, the 31st Infantry became known as "the Polar Bear regiment", adopting a silver polar bear as its insignia.

== Interwar period ==
Part of the regiment sailed from Vladivostok on the USAT Crook in February 1920 and arrived at Manila, Philippine Islands, near the end of the month. The remainder sailed on the USAT South Bend on 30 March 1920 and arrived at Fort William McKinley, Philippines, on 16 April 1920. On 16 December 1920, the entire regiment was transferred to the Post of Manila. It was assigned to the Philippine Division on 22 October 1921, and relieved from the division on 26 June 1931.

=== China service ===
On 1 February 1932, the regiment was ordered to Shanghai, China, arriving on 4 February. There, the unit guarded a section of the International Settlement, during a period of considerable fighting between Japanese and Chinese troops. Reinforcing the 4th Marine Regiment and a predominantly British International Force, the 31st Infantry deployed hastily by sea to protect Shanghai's International Settlement. Although adjacent parts of Shanghai were demolished by fierce fighting between Japanese and Chinese troops, the International Settlement remained an island of security. By April, some officers sent for their families from Manila and billeted them at a hotel in the International Settlement. On 1 July 1932, when the crisis passed, the unit sailed for the Philippines on the USAT Republic. For their service in Shanghai, they received the Yangtze Service Medal (Marines). The regiment’s mission in the Philippine Department’s defense plan was to deploy to Corregidor and act as the beach defense force for the Harbor Defenses of Manila and Subic Bays. The regiment was reassigned to the Philippine Division in December 1941.

== World War II ==
On 8 December 1941, Japanese planes attacked U.S. military installations in the Philippines. A 31st Infantry sergeant on detail at Camp John Hay in Baguio became the campaign's first fatality. After landing in northern and Southern Luzon, the Japanese pushed rapidly toward Manila, routing hastily formed Philippine Army units that had little training and few heavy weapons. The 31st Infantry covered the withdrawal of American and Philippine forces to the Bataan Peninsula. Unfortunately, the peninsula had not been provisioned with food and medicine and no help could come in from the outside after much of the Pacific fleet was destroyed at Pearl Harbor and mid-ocean bases at Guam and Wake Island were lost.

Despite starvation, disease, no supplies, obsolete weapons, and often inoperative ammunition, the peninsula's defenders fought the Japanese to a standstill for 4 months, upsetting Japan's timetable for Asia's conquest.

When Major General King announced he would surrender the Bataan Defense Force on 9 April 1942, the 31st Infantry buried its colors and the cherished Shanghai Bowl to keep them out of enemy hands. Some of the 31st's survivors escaped to continue resisting, but most underwent brutal torture and humiliation on the Bataan Death March and nearly three years of captivity. Twenty-nine of the regiment's men earned the Distinguished Service Cross and one was recommended for the Medal of Honor, but the entire chain of command died in captivity before the medal recommendation could be formally submitted. Roughly half of the 1600 men of the 31st Infantry who surrendered at Bataan perished while prisoners of the Japanese.

Perhaps of note, the Shanghai Bowl was later recovered due to the efforts of Cpt. Earl R. Short (who had buried it) after his release from a POW camp, and Col. Niederpreum. He returned to Corregidor Island under the orders of Major General Marshall in September 1945 to retrieve the bowl from its hidden location. While he was able to pinpoint the area, others had to continue the excavation until it was located in December 1945. The Bowl and Cups were found a yard and a half from where Cpt. Short had remembered them to be. And so, the trophy and symbol of the 31st Regiment was returned to them.

== Korean War ==
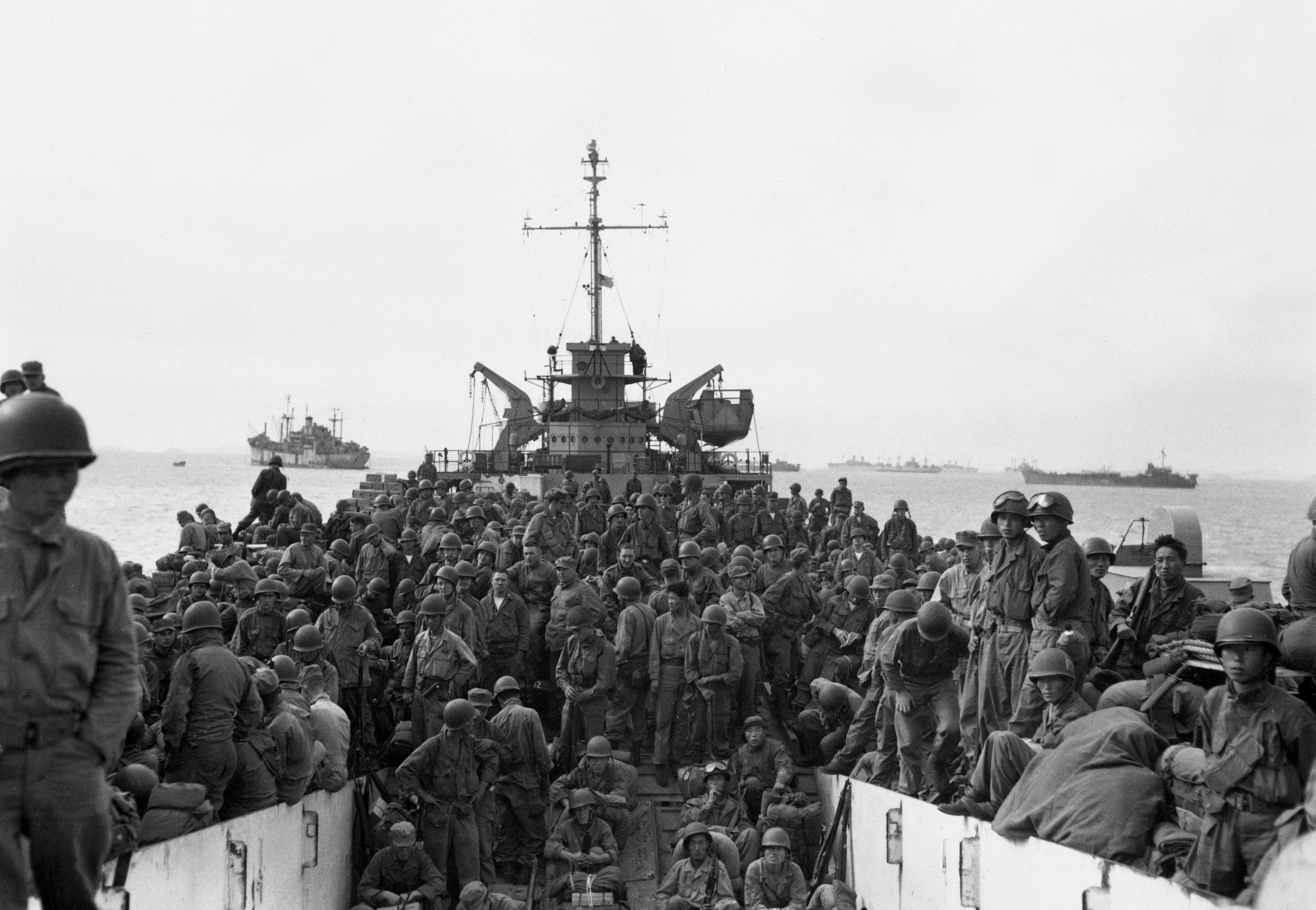
The regiment landing at Inchon on September 18, 1950

In January 1946, General MacArthur restored his former guard of honor to active service at Seoul, Korea, assigning the 31st to the 7th Infantry Division. For the next 2 years the 31st Infantry performed occupation duty in central Korea, facing the Soviet Army across the 38th Parallel. In 1948, the occupation of Korea ended and the regiment moved to the Japanese island of Hokkaido. When North Korean troops invaded South Korea in the summer of 1950, the 31st Infantry was stripped to cadre strength to reinforce other units being sent to Korea. In September, the regiment was restored to full strength with replacements from the U.S. and Koreans (KATUSA) hastily drafted by their government and shipped to Japan for a few weeks training before returning to their homeland as members of American units. The 31st Infantry returned to Korea as part of MacArthur's Inchon invasion force.

In November 1950, the 31st Infantry made its second amphibious invasion of the campaign, landing at Riwŏn, not far from Vladivostok where the 31st had fought just 30 years before. With North Korean resistance shattered, UN troops pushed toward the Yalu River. When Chinese troops swept down from Manchuria, they surrounded a task force led by the 31st Infantry's commander, COL Allan MacLean. COL MacLean and his successor, LTC Don C. Faith, were both killed during the ensuing battle. LTC Faith was awarded the Medal of Honor posthumously for his gallant attempt to lead the command to safety.

COL William J. McCaffrey assumed command of the 31st Infantry as they fought against desperate odds on the east side of the Chosin Reservoir from the night of 27 November until 1 December while the Marines did likewise on the west side. Several hundred 31st Infantry survivors managed to make it across the frozen reservoir to the Marines' lines the night of 1 December and the next day, and accompanied the Marines in their fighting withdrawal from the Chosin to Hungnam from 1–11 December 1950. Of the task force's original complement of nearly 3300 men, only 385 of those who reached Marine lines at Hagaru-ri from the inlet were unwounded. Not one vehicle or piece of heavy equipment made it through. An example of courage shown by unit members is the DSC awarded to Sergeant George H. Paine:

Citation: The Distinguished Service Cross is awarded to Sergeant George H. Paine, United States Army, for extraordinary heroism in action while serving with Company H, 31st Infantry Regiment, Seventh Infantry Division, on 30 November 1950, near Koto-ri, Korea. He was with the leading element of the Second Battalion moving north to link up with friendly units when the column was attacked by enemy who were entrenched and concentrated on high ground along the route of advance. Sergeant Paine located several enemy positions on a hillside from which automatic-weapons and small-arms were firing. Bravely and without regard for his own personal safety, he advanced alone against these positions, exposing himself to draw their fire from other elements of the column who were regrouping to make an attack. In his advance, he neutralized two enemy automatic weapons, permitting friendly troops to advance without casualties. Joining the attacking troops of the battalion, he assisted in driving the enemy from their positions around the hilltop. During this action Sergeant Paine was mortally wounded while fiercely resisting enemy forces counterattacking in an attempt to retain the hilltop. This counterattack was repulsed with heavy loss of enemy personnel. The courageous actions of Sergeant Paine were an inspiration to his comrades and enabled the battalion to complete its mission.
- HQ Eighth US Army Korea, General Orders No. 113 (4 March 1951).

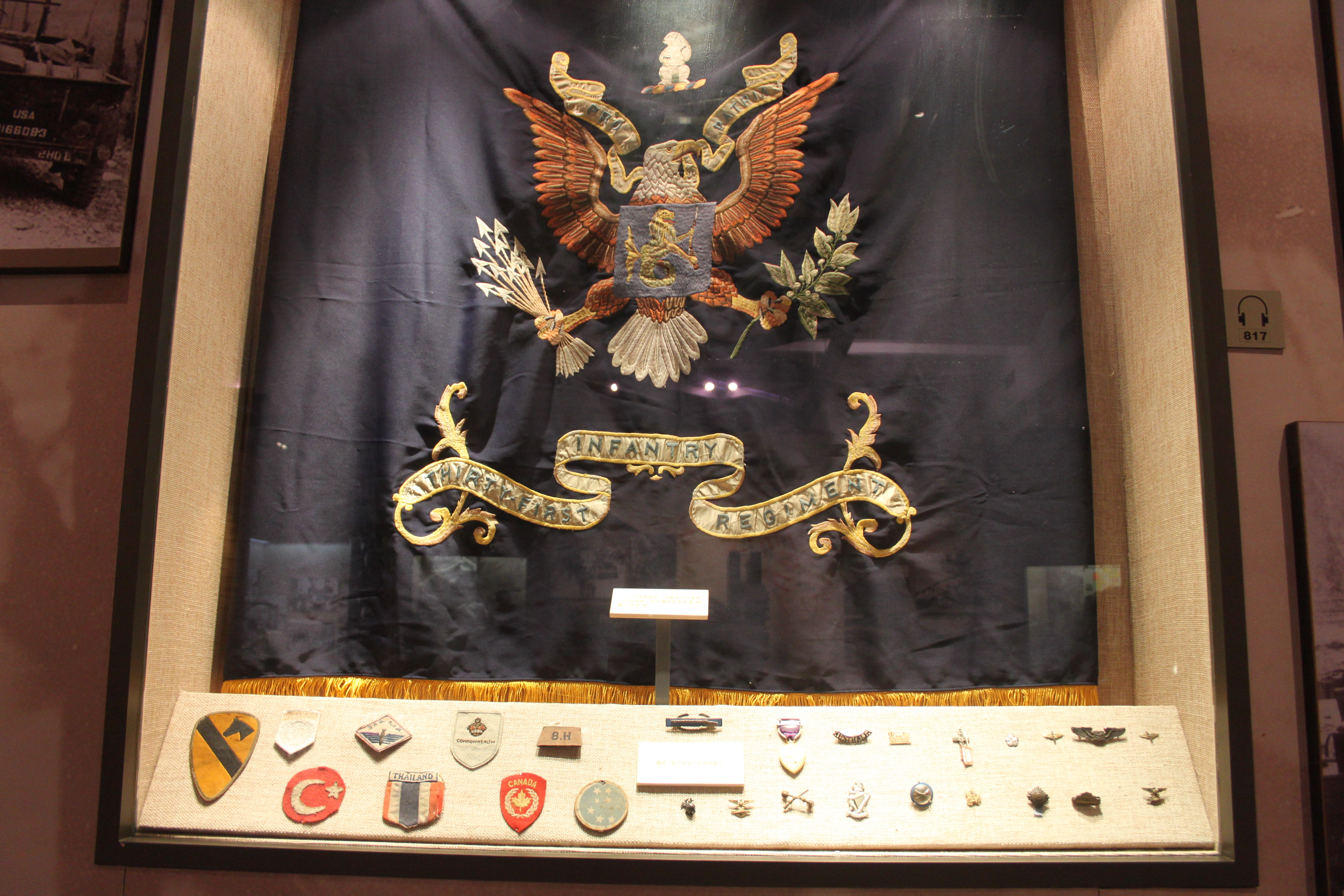
Captured regimental flag on display at the Military Museum of the Chinese People's Revolution

The remnants of the regiment was evacuated from North Korea by sea to Pusan. There it rebuilt, retrained, and refitted and was soon back in combat, stopping the Chinese at Chechon, South Korea and participating in the counteroffensive to retake central Korea. Near the Hwacheon Reservoir, two men of the regiment earned the Medal of Honor in some of the war's most determined offensive combat. By the summer of 1951, the line stabilized near the war's start point along the 38th Parallel.

31st Infantry's 1st Battalion has the distinction of being the first Army battalion to be commanded by an ethnic minority on the battlefield, when COL McCaffrey promoted then MAJ Young-Oak Kim upon his return in August 1951 from injuries sustained during a friendly fire incident when his unit became the first American troops to cross beyond the 38th parallel and thought to be too far north to be friendly during Operation Piledriver.

For the next two years, a seemingly endless series of blows were exchanged across central Korea's desolate hills. Names like Old Baldy, Pork Chop Hill, Triangle Hill, and OP Dale are among the war's most famous battles, all fought by the 31st Infantry. By the war's end, the 31st Infantry had suffered many times its strength in losses; 5 of its men had earned the Medal of Honor, Ralph E. Pomeroy (20 May 1951), Benjamin F. Wilson (5 June 1951), Jack G. Hanson (7 June 1951), and Edward R. Schowalter Jr. (14 October 1952) .

Not all losses were American as UN units such as the Ethiopian Kagnew Battalion who would be attached to the 31st Infantry during the Battle of Pork Chop Hill, and fought with distinction as Army observer, BG S.L.A. Marshall noted, "...under full observation from enemy country, eight Ethiopians walked 800 yards across no-man's land and up the slope of T-Bone Hill right into the enemy trenches. When next we looked, the eight had become ten. The patrol was dragging back two Chinese prisoners, having snatched them from the embrace of the Communist battalion..."

== Garrison duty ==
After the war, the 31st Infantry Regiment remained in Korea until the Army reorganized all infantry regiments into battle groups in 1957. The 1st Battle Group 31st Infantry, representing the only regiment that had never served in the continental United States, remained in Korea with the 7th Infantry Division. In 1958, the 2d Battle Group 31st Infantry was formed at Fort Rucker, Alabama, planting the proud regiment's flag on the U.S. homeland for the first time in its history. In 1964, the 2d Battle Group was reorganized as the 5th Battalion 31st Infantry which was transferred to Ft. Benning, Georgia in 1967 and reassigned to the 197th Infantry Brigade. The 5th Battalion was inactivated at Ft. Benning in 1971.

In 1959, the 3d Battle Group 31st Infantry was formed in the Army Reserve in southern California as part of the 63rd Infantry Division.

== Vietnam War ==
When the Army abandoned battle groups in favor of brigades and battalions in 1963, the 31st Infantry's 1st and 2nd Battalions were reactivated in South Korea, the 3rd Battalion remained in the Army Reserve, and the 5th Battalion replaced the 2nd Battle Group at Fort Rucker. When the Vietnam War came, two more battalions of the 31st Infantry were formed. The 4th Battalion was formed at Fort Devens, Massachusetts in 1965 and the 6th Battalion was formed at Fort Lewis, Washington in 1967.

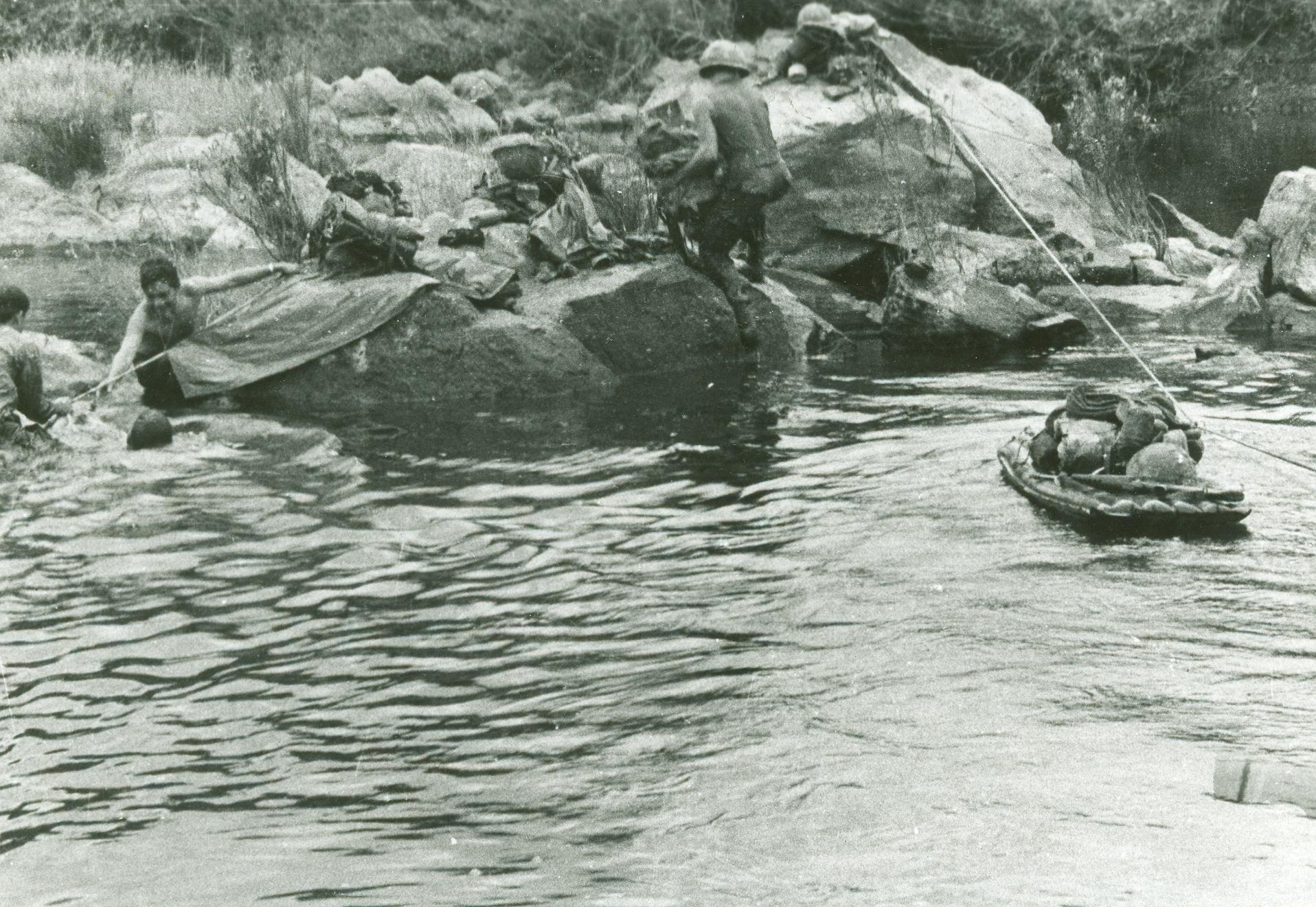
Soldiers from the 4th Battalion, 31st Infantry Regiment at Nui Cho Mountain.

The 4th Battalion went to South Vietnam in the spring of 1967, operating initially in War Zone D and around Tay Ninh near the Cambodian border as a unit under the 196th Infantry Brigade (Separate). In 1967, the battalion moved north to help form the 23rd "Americal" Infantry Division. Operating at Quang Ngai, Chu Lai and the Que Son Valley for most of the rest of the war, the 4th Battalion fought to keep Viet Cong guerillas and the People's Army of Vietnam away from the coastal lowlands. Two of the battalion's men earned the Medal of Honor almost a year apart near the bitterly contested village of Hiep Duc. When American forces departed, the 4th Battalion 31st Infantry was part of the last brigade to leave Vietnam. It was inactivated in 1971.

The 6th Battalion was sent to South Vietnam in the spring of 1968, arriving just in time to help recapture Saigon's suburbs during the abortive May Offensive. For the next two years, the 6th Battalion fought all across the Mekong Delta and the Plain of Reeds. When the 9th Infantry Division departed in 1969, the 6th Battalion 31st Infantry formed the nucleus of a 1,200-man task force under LTC Gerald Carlson (Task Force Carlson) to cover the division's departure. Remaining in Vietnam, the 6th Battalion conducted an Air Assault as part of the 3rd Brigade into the Parrot's Beak, Cambodia in May 1970, making the famed "Seminole Raid" to seize and destroy a huge enemy base area bordering the Plain of Reeds. The battalion returned to Fort Lewis for inactivation in October 1970.

== Post-Vietnam ==
In 1971, the 2d Battalion was inactivated in Korea. The 1st Battalion remained in Korea, however, serving there until its inactivation in 1987. It has still never served in the continental United States. In 1974, the 2d Battalion was reactivated at Fort Ord, CA where it remained until its inactivation in 1988. Beginning in 1980, the 6th Battalion, reactivated, served as component of the Opposition Force at the National Training Center at Fort Irwin, California, as part of the 177th Armored Brigade until the battalion was reflagged as the 1st Battalion, 52nd Infantry Regiment in 1988.

The 4th Battalion, 31st Infantry Regiment, was reactivated at Fort Sill, Oklahoma to support the Field Artillery School and the 6th Battalion was reactivated at Fort Irwin, California, serving there until its inactivation in 1988. In 1995, the 4th Battalion was inactivated at Fort Sill and reactivated as part of the 10th Mountain Division at Fort Drum, New York the following April. It is now the regiment's only battalion on the active rolls.

== War on terror ==
In September and October 2001, the Polar Bears were once again called to arms to participate in the nation's War on terror. From Maryland to Kuwait, Qatar and Uzbekistan the 31st protected American forces and facilities from terrorist attack. As America and its coalition partners struck back, the Polar Bears of A Company redeployed from Kuwait to Afghanistan. C Company and 4th Battalion Commander joined A Company for combat operations in Afghanistan, fighting in the Shah-I-Kowt Valley region and successfully eliminating it as a safe haven for international terrorism. In April 2002, the Polar Bears returned to Fort Drum, and in 2003 roughly 300 soldiers from the 4–31st deployed to Djibouti, B company to Iraq, and A Company to Camp Phoenix outside Kabul, Afghanistan in support of CJTF-HOA as TF 4–31. Company C was one of the units identified as having deployed.

C Company, 4th Battalion, 31st Infantry Regiment, conducted the various training exercises in July 2003, while in Djibouti including known distance ranges, both in Djibouti and Ethiopia; reflexive fire ranges, both in Djibouti and Ethiopia; AK-47 range for familiarization of the weapon system; familiarization ranges for shotguns and 9 mm pistols; external sling load training with Heavy Marine Helicopter Company (HMH-461) both day and night iterations to help certify them; its mortar platoon underwent training on the mortar ballistic computer and the plotting board to further their proficiency. They also conducted military to military training in Hurso and provided a security mission in the capital Addis Ababa.

In March 2003, B Company, 4th Battalion, 31st Infantry Regiment deployed in support of Operation Iraqi Freedom in order to conduct base defense and combat operations for (combined joint special operations task force-AP) CJSOTF- Arabian Peninsula. May 2003, C/4-31 and the battalion's Mortar Platoon deployed to the Horn of Africa to conduct operations in Djibouti and Ethiopia in support of Operation Enduring Freedom for CJTF Horn of Africa. A/4-31 and HHC/4-31 deployed to Camp Phoenix in Kabul, Afghanistan to conduct security operations for CJTF-Phoenix which was training the Afghan National Army (ANA). Select members of the battalion were also designated as trainers for the ANA.

In May 2004, the Polar Bears again deployed with the 2nd BCT in support of Operation Iraqi Freedom. Upon completion of training at Kuwait, the task force assumed responsibility for conducting combat operations in the Taji, Saba al Boor, Al Rasheed, Kadhamiya, Abu Ghraib, and Yusufiyah districts of Baghdad. The most significant event for the battalion was during the first ever Iraqi national elections, when TF 4–31 provided polling centers in the Kadhamiya area with security and other force protection measures. The battalion was then called upon to secure the Abu Ghraib Internment Facility from attacks. Before redeployment the battalion conducted task force level air assaults and raids in enemy strongholds south of Baghdad. TF 4–31 returned to Fort Drum in June 2005, where they continued to train and prepare for the next call to battle.

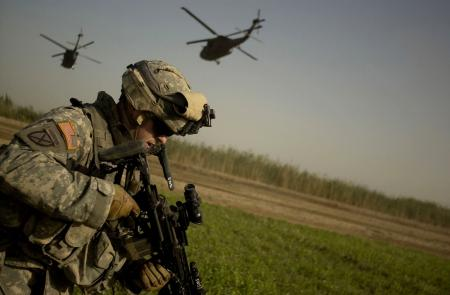
A soldier from Company C, 4th Battalion, 31st Infantry Regiment, prepares to perform a foot patrol in Yusufiyah, Iraq, in support of locating three kidnapped U.S. soldiers

Task Force 4–31 deployed again to Iraq for 15 months, beginning 16 August 2006. The 809 member task force was their brigade's main effort and was given the daunting task of establishing the first permanent coalition force presence in the Sunni region south of Baghdad frequently referred to as "The Sunni Triangle of Death". Working daily with their sister Iraqi Army battalion to re-establish the rule of law and the legitimacy of local Iraqi forces to the area, Task Force 4–31 became a model vehicle of contemporary counterinsurgency theory and practice. They established six patrol bases, 17 battle positions, assisted the Iraqi Army in the establishment of many more. They conducted over 50 air assaults and three amphibious operations, and fired nearly 400 counter-fire artillery missions against enemy forces and in support of troops in contact. TF 4–31 killed or wounded 51 insurgents and captured 148, while aiding the Iraqi Army in the capture of over 1,500 additional insurgents. While actively hunting insurgents, the soldiers of TF 4–31 set about improving the community, aiding in the improvement of schools, roads, irrigation canals, community centers, and emplacing solar power streetlights.

Task Force 4–31 suffered 28 soldiers killed in action. Five of those soldiers, all belonging to D/4-31, were killed on 12 May 2007 when their observation post was attacked by insurgents in a pre-dawn raid. Two additional soldiers at that position, SGT Alex Jimenez and PFC Byron Fouty, were captured during that attack and were missing until July 2008. The Polar Bears earned two Silver Stars and the battalion was awarded a Valorous Unit Award. Task Force 4–31 returned to Fort Drum in November 2007. In October 2009 TF 4–31 returned to Iraq for an 8-month deployment.

4–31 IN returned to Fort Drum at the end of June 2010 in accordance with President Obama's pledge that all combat troops would be out of Iraq by the end of August.

In 2015, 4–31 was deployed to Afghanistan and was spread to 13 different Forward Operating Bases where they advised local police and military forces. They returned home in February 2016.

In 2018, 4-31 IN deployed again to Afghanistan for 9 months, spreading out across the country as the Theatre Response Force. They returned home in July 2019.

The battalion was on deployment in Afghanistan as Operation Allies Refuge began in 2021. The battalion was protecting the Kabul 2021 evacuation from Afghanistan in August 2021.

In 2023, 4-31 IN deployed again to the CENTCOM Area of Operations (AOR), spreading out in several countries (Iraq, Kuwait, Jordan, and more).

== The Shanghai Bowl ==
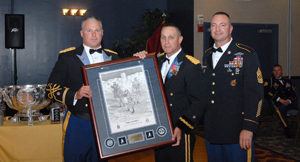
The Shanghai Bowl is seen to the left of LTC Robert Ryan

The Shanghai Bowl has become a very important symbol of the lineage of the 31st Infantry Regiment. The large silver punch bowl and its matching cups were made in 1932 by a Shanghai silversmith, fashioned from approximately 1,600 silver US trade dollars that were collected from the officers of the unit.

When Bataan fell to the Japanese in April 1942 it became obvious that the 31st would be forced to surrender. To keep these important items from falling into enemy hands, the bowl and cups, along with the colors and unit standard, were buried on Corregidor Island. The artifacts were finally retrieved in 1945.

The bowl now sits in the headquarters building of the regiment's only remaining battalion: the 4th Battalion, 31st Infantry Regiment, at Fort Drum, New York.

== Unit decorations ==
- Presidential Unit Citation (Army) – Luzon 1941–1942
- Presidential Unit Citation (Army) – Bataan
- Presidential Unit Citation (Army) – Defense of the Philippines
- Presidential Unit Citation (Army) – Quang Tin Province (Vietnam) (4th Battalion)
- Presidential Unit Citation (Navy) – Chosin Reservoir
- Presidential Unit Citation (Navy) – Hwechon Reservoir
- Valorous Unit Award – Que Son-Hiep Duc (4th Battalion)
- Valorous Unit Award – Saigon (6th Battalion)
- Valorous Unit Award – Parrot's Beak (6th Battalion)
- Valorous Unit Award – Company C additionally entitled to:

Streamer embroidered KHOWST PROVINCE, AFGHANISTAN 2002

- Valorous Unit Award – Iraq 2006–2007 (4th Battalion)
- Meritorious Unit Commendation – Iraq 2005 (4th Battalion)
- Navy Unit Commendation – Panmunjom
- Philippine Presidential Unit Citation – 1941–1942
- Republic of Korea Presidential Unit Citation – Inchon
- Republic of Korea Presidential Unit Citation – Korea 1950–1953
- Republic of Korea Presidential Unit Citation – Korea 1946–1950, 1953–1957
- Vietnamese Cross of Gallantry with Palm – April–June 1968 (6th Battalion)
- Vietnamese Cross of Gallantry with Palm – July–November 1968 (6th Battalion)
- Vietnamese Cross of Gallantry with Palm – 1969 (4th and 6th Battalions)
- Vietnamese Cross of Gallantry with Palm – 1969–1970 (4th and 6th Battalions)
- Vietnamese Civic Action Honor Medal, First Class – 1968–1969 (6th Battalion)
- Vietnamese Civic Action Honor Medal, First Class – 1969–1970 (6th Battalion)

The 31st Inf. Reg. has 7 Medal of Honor recipients. 5 during the Korean War and 2 during the Vietnam War. The 31st Inf. Reg. also has 86 Distinguished Service Crosses.

== Commanding officers ==
source: 17th Anniversary Organization Day, 13 August 1933 source: 23rd Anniversary Organization Day, 13 August 1939

- COL Walter H. Gordon (1 Aug 1916 to 26 Jun 1917)
- COL Frederic H. Sargent (27 Jun 1917 to 1 Oct 1919)
- COL Fred W. Bugbee (2 Oct 1919 to 4 Apr 1920)
- COL Ralph H. Van Deman (5 Apr 1920 to 6 Apr 1923)
- LTC F. C. Endicott (7 Apr 1923 to 17 Oct 1923)
- COL William Uline (18 Oct 1923 to 8 Jan 1924; 3 Jun 1924 to 4 Jul 1925; 5 Oct to 3 Nov 1925)
- LTC H. Clay M. Supplee (4 Nov 1925 to 22 Feb 1926)
- COL Daniel G. Berry (23 Feb 1926 to 15 Feb 1928)
- COL James H. Kimbrough (16 Feb 1928 to 11 Mar 1930)
- COL Earle W. Tanner (12 Mar 1930 to 4 Aug 1930)
- COL E. L. Hooper (5 Aug 1930 to 8 Dec 1930)
- COL Gustave A. Wieser (9 Dec 1930 to 29 Jan 1931)
- LTC George A. Lynch (24 Feb 1931 to 17 Jun 1931)
- COL Lorenzo D. Gasser (18 Jun 1931 to 18 Mar 1934)
- LTC Oliver S. Wood (19 Mar 1934 to 16 Jun 1934)
- COL Samuel T. Mackall (17 Jun 1934 to 12 Feb 1936)
- COL Charles S. Hamilton (13 Feb 1936 to 20 Feb 1938)
- COL William A. Alfonte (21 Feb 1938 to 30 Oct 1938)
- COL Jesse C. Drain (31 October 1938 to Jul 1940)
- LTC Constant L. Irwin (Jul 1940 to Nov 1940)
- COL Albert M. Jones (Nov 1940 to Dec 1941)
- COL Charles L. Steel (Dec 1941 to Mar 1942)
- LTC Jasper E. Brady (Mar 1942 to Apr 1942)
- COL Lee Wallace (Jan 1946 to Sep 1947)
- COL Eustis L. Poland (Sep 1947 to May 1948)
- LTC William S. Bodner (May 1948 to Jun 1948)
- LTC Ralph E. Leighton Jr. (Jun 1948 to Sep 1948)
- COL Willett J. Baird (Sep 1948 to Dec 1948)
- LTC Ralph E. Leighton Jr. (Dec 1948 to Jan 1949)
- LTC Marion W. Schewe (Jan 1949 to Mar 1949)
- COL John K. Miller (Mar 1949 to Feb 1950)
- COL Richard P. Ovenshine (Feb 1950 to Oct 1950)
- COL Allan MacLean (Oct 1950 to November 1950)
- LTC Don C. Faith Jr. (November 1950 to December 1950)
- COL John A. Gavin (Dec 1950 to Mar 1951)
- LTC William J. McCaffrey (Mar 1951 to Nov 1951)
- LTC Glen A. Nelson (Nov 1951 to Dec 1951)
- COL Noel M. Cox (WIA) (Dec 1951 to Jun 1952)
- COL Lloyd R. Moses (Jun 1952 to Nov 1952)
- COL William B. Kern (Nov 1952 to May 1953)
- COL Carl T. Schmidt (May 1953 to Jul 1953)
- COL Edgar C. Doleman(Jul 1953 to Dec 1953)
- LTC William H. G. Fuller (Dec 1953 to Feb 1954)
- COL Richard K. Boyd (Feb 1954 to Aug 1954)
- COL Walter E. Sewall (Aug 1954 to Feb 1955)
- COL George E. Fletcher (Feb 1955 to Apr 1956)
- COL George L. Mabry Jr. (Apr 1956 to Oct 1956)
- COL George Clowes (Oct 1956 to Jun 1957)
- LTC James Hannon (Feb. 1975 to Feb. 1976)
- LTC Heath (1983 to 1985)
- LTC Jeffrey White (Dec 1985 to Dec 1986)
- LTC Richard F. Holmes (Dec 1986 to May 1987)
- LTC David W. Hunt (1987 to 1988)
- LTC Stephen J. Townsend (2000 to 2002)
- LTC John Spiszer (2002 to 2005)
- LTC Michael Infanti (2005 to 10 Dec 2007)
- LTC Richard G. Greene Jr. (10 Dec 2007 to 29 Sep 2010)
- LTC Robert M. Ryan (29 Sep 2010 to 5 Jun 2012)
- LTC Roland Dicks (5 Jun 2012 to Aug 2014)
- LTC Christopher Landers (Aug 2014 to May 2016)
- LTC Issac Rademacher (May 2016 to May 2018)
- LTC Steven Wallace (May 2018 to Feb 2020)
- LTC Christopher M. Rowe (Feb 2020 to May 2022)
- LTC David J. Simmons (May 2022 to Feb 2024)
- LTC Charles Shaeffer (Feb 2024 to April 2024)
- MAJ Joshua Bobbitt (April 2024 to June 2024)
- LTC Jared Larpenteur (June 2024- Present)

http://www.31stinfantry.org/history/past-commanders/

== Notable members ==
- Albert Jones - Commanded 51st Division (PA) and I Corps in the Philippine in Bataan during WW2 and became POW.
- Harold K. Johnson - US Army Chief of Staff 1964 - 1968.
