= Nelemnoye =

Nelemnoye Нелемное Нелемнэй (Sakha)
- Selo
- Interactive map of Nelemnoye
- Location of Nelemnoye Nelemnoye (Sakha Republic)
- Coordinates: 65°29′54″N 151°05′55″E
- Country: Russia
- Federal subject: Sakha Republic
- Administrative district: Verkhnekolymsky District
- Rural okrugSelsoviet: Nelemninsky National Rural Okrug
- Founded: 1930

Population (2010 Census)
  - Total: 262
  - Estimate (2021): 230 (−12.2%)

Administrative status
  - Capital of: Nelemninsky National Rural Okrug

Municipal status
  - Municipal district: Verkhnekolymsky Municipal District
  - Rural settlement: Nelemninsky National Rural Settlement
  - Capital of: Nelemninsky National Rural Settlement
- Time zone: UTC+
- Postal code: 678773
- OKTMO ID: 98615414101

Nelemnoye (Russian: Нелемное; Yakut: Нелемнэй, Nelemney) is a rural locality (a selo), the only inhabited locality, and the administrative center of Nelemninsky National Rural Okrug of Verkhnekolymsky District in the Sakha Republic, Russia, located 46 kilometers (29 mi) from Zyryanka, the administrative center of the district. Its population as of the 2010 Census was 262, of whom 145 were male and 117 female, down from 282 recorded during the 2002 Census.

== Etymology ==
The name of the locality derives from nelma, a kind of fish that the rivers around the locality are rich of.

== Kolyma Yukaghirs ==
Nelemnoye is known for having a significant population of Kolyma Yukaghirs (at the time when the total population of the locality was 296, 168 of them were Yukaghirs). It is the only place to have a Kolyma Yukaghir cultural center and a school where the Southern Yukaghir language is being taught.

The music video for the song "Ulegen Nume" by the Yukaghir singer Irina Duskulova was shot in Nelemnoye.

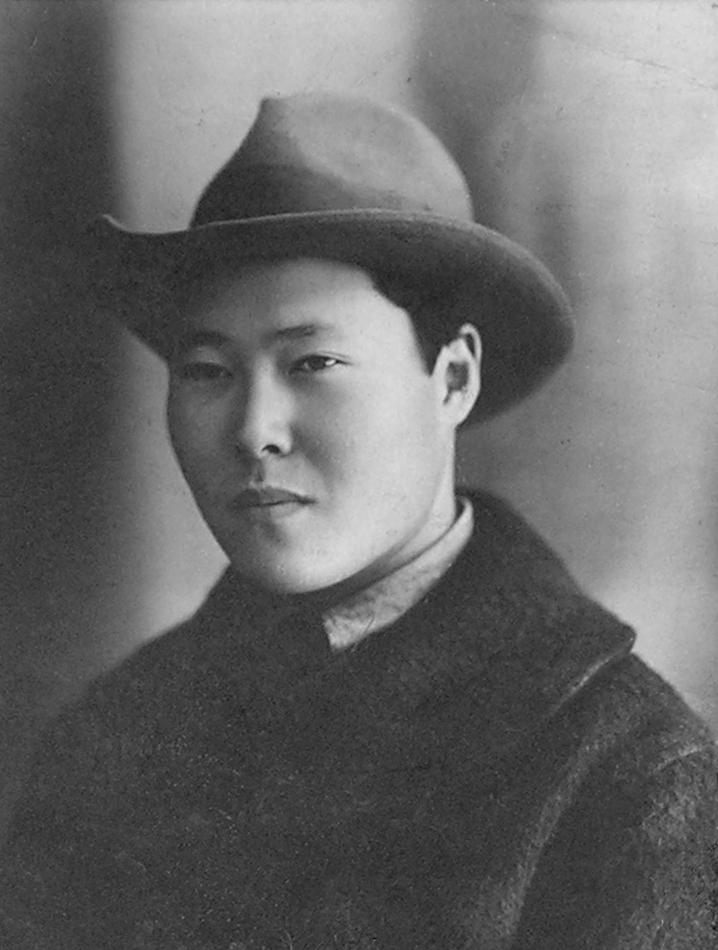
Spiridonov in the late 1920s

Nikolai Spiridonov (a.k.a. Tekki Odulok), the first Yukaghir writer and scientist, was born in 1906 in Ottur-Kyuyol, near the modern location of Nelemnoye.
