= OMK =

OMK or omk may refer to:

- Operation Military Kids, a program targeted to the children of members of the U.S. Armed Forces who are deployed overseas
- OMK, the IATA and FAA LID code for Omak Airport, Washington, United States
- omk, the ISO 639-3 code for Omok language, an extinct language of Russia
