= Usun-Kyuyol =

Usun-Kyuyol (Russian: Усун-Кюёль) is the name of several rural localities in the Sakha Republic, Russia:

- Usun-Kyuyol, Churapchinsky District, Sakha Republic, a selo in Sylansky Rural Okrug of Churapchinsky District
- Usun-Kyuyol, Suntarsky District, Sakha Republic, a selo in Arylakhsky Rural Okrug of Suntarsky District
- Usun-Kyuyol, Ust-Aldansky District, Sakha Republic, a selo in Ospekhinsky 1-y Rural Okrug of Ust-Aldansky District
- Usun-Kyuyol, Verkhnekolymsky District, Sakha Republic, a selo in Arylakhsky Rural Okrug of Verkhnekolymsky District
