= Verkhnekolymsk =

Verkhnekolymsk Верхнеколымск Үөһээ Халыма (Sakha)
- Selo
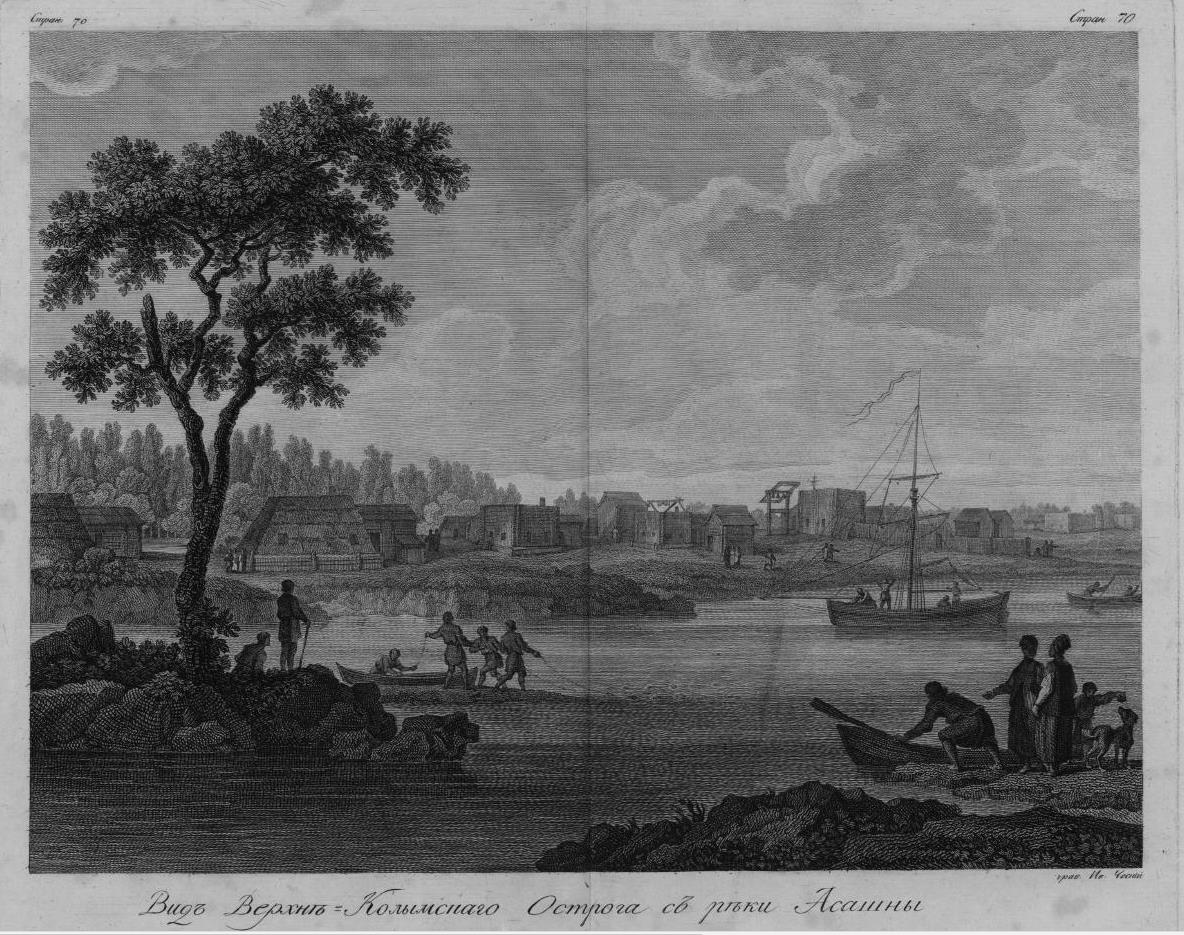
- Vekhnekolymsk - 1802
- Interactive map of Verkhnekolymsk
- Location of Verkhnekolymsk Verkhnekolymsk (Sakha Republic)
- Coordinates: 65°43′03″N 150°50′06″E
- Country: Russia
- Federal subject: Sakha Republic
- Administrative district: Verkhnekolymsky District
- Rural okrugSelsoviet: Verkhnekolymsky Rural Okrug
- Founded: 1647

Population (2010 Census)
  - Total: 365
  - Estimate (2021): 335 (−8.2%)

Administrative status
  - Capital of: Verkhnekolymsky Rural Okrug

Municipal status
  - Municipal district: Verkhnekolymsky Municipal District
  - Rural settlement: Verkhnekolymsky Rural Settlement
  - Capital of: Verkhnekolymsky Rural Settlement
- Time zone: UTC+
- Postal code: 678770
- OKTMO ID: 98615409101

Verkhnekolymsk (Russian: Верхнеколымск; Yakut: Үөһээ Халыма, Üöhee Xalıma) is a rural locality (a selo), the only inhabited locality, and the administrative center of Verkhnekolymsky Rural Okrug of Verkhnekolymsky District in the Sakha Republic, Russia, located 5 kilometers (3.1 mi) from Zyryanka, the administrative center of the district. Its population as of the 2010 Census was 365, up from 355 recorded in the 2002 Census.

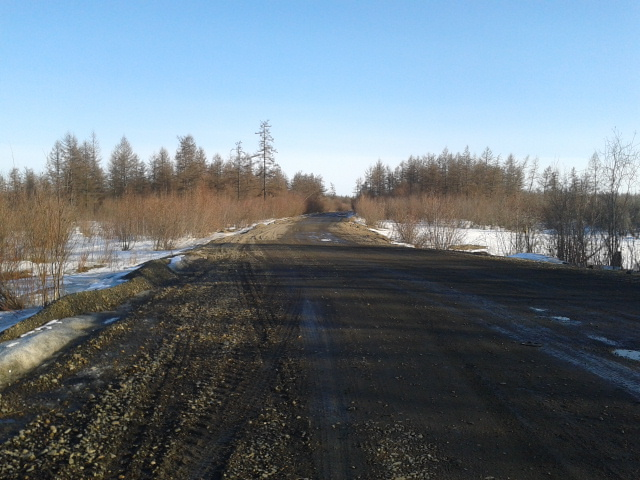
Road to Verkhnekolymsk
