= ZKP =

ZKP may refer to:

== Organizations ==
- Zrzeszenie Kaszubsko-Pomorskie, the Kashubian–Pomeranian Association
- Związek Kompozytorów Polskich, the Polish Composers' Union

== Other uses ==
- Zyryanka Airport, Russia, by IATA airport code
- Zero-knowledge proof
