= Zyryanka West Airport =

Airport in Sakha Republic, Russia

- IATA: none; ICAO: none

Summary
- Serves: Zyryanka, Verkhnekolymsky District, Sakha Republic, Russia
- Coordinates: 65°44′18″N 150°42′28″E

Maps
- Sakha Republic in Russia

- Location of the airport in the Sakha Republic

Runways
Direction	Length		Surface
Direction	m	ft	Surface
	1,800	5,906	Concrete

Zyryanka West Airport is an airport in Russia, located 8 kilometres (5.0 mi) west of Zyryanka, Verkhnekolymsky District in the Sakha Republic of Russia. It was built during World War II for the Alaska-Siberian (ALSIB) air route used to ferry American Lend-Lease aircraft to the Eastern Front. It is now barely used, when main Zyryanka Airport cannot be used.

== Airlines and destinations ==
Airlines	Destinations
Yakutia Airlines	Yakutsk

== See also ==
- List of airports in Russia
