= Ugolny =

Ugolny (Russian: Угольный; masculine), Ugolnaya (Угольная; feminine), or Ugolnoye (Угольное; neuter) is the name of several rural localities in Russia.

== Modern localities ==
- Ugolny (rural locality), a settlement in Tyulkovsky Selsoviet of Balakhtinsky District in Krasnoyarsk Krai
- Ugolnoye, Amur Oblast, a selo under the administrative jurisdiction of Raychikhinsk Urban Okrug in Amur Oblast
- Ugolnoye, Nizhny Novgorod Oblast, a village in Bolsheokulovsky Selsoviet of Navashinsky District in Nizhny Novgorod Oblast; 55°37′N 42°10′E
- Ugolnoye, Orenburg Oblast, a selo in Ugolny Selsoviet of Sol-Iletsky District in Orenburg Oblast
- Ugolnoye, Oryol Oblast (also Ugolny, Ugolnaya), a village in Rechitsky Selsoviet of Livensky District in Oryol Oblast; 52°27′N 37°20′E
- Ugolnoye, Sakha Republic, a selo in Ugolninsky Rural Okrug of Verkhnekolymsky District in the Sakha Republic
- Ugolnoye, Tula Oblast, a village in Chentsovskaya Rural Administration of Odoyevsky District in Tula Oblast
- Ugolnaya, Alarsky District, Irkutsk Oblast, a village in Alarsky District of Irkutsk Oblast
- Ugolnaya, Bokhansky District, Irkutsk Oblast, a village in Bokhansky District of Irkutsk Oblast

== Alternative names ==
- Ugolny (Ugolnoye), alternative names of Bylym, a selo in Elbrussky District of the Kabardino-Balkar Republic; 43°27′N 43°3′E
