= Utaya =

Utaya Утая Утайа (Sakha)
- Selo
- Interactive map of Utaya
- Location of Utaya Utaya (Sakha Republic)
- Coordinates: 66°04′N 148°12′E
- Country: Russia
- Federal subject: Sakha Republic
- Administrative district: Verkhnekolymsky District
- Rural okrugSelsoviet: Utainsky Rural Okrug

Population (2010 Census)
  - Total: 98
  - Estimate (2021): 117 (+19.4%)

Administrative status
  - Capital of: Utainsky Rural Okrug

Municipal status
  - Municipal district: Verkhnekolymsky Municipal District
  - Rural settlement: Utainsky Rural Settlement
  - Capital of: Utainsky Rural Settlement
- Time zone: UTC+
- Postal code: 678770
- OKTMO ID: 98615430101

Utaya (Russian: Утая; Yakut: Утайа) is a rural locality (a selo), the only inhabited locality, and the administrative center of Utainsky Rural Okrug of Verkhnekolymsky District in the Sakha Republic, Russia, located 170 kilometers (110 mi) from Zyryanka, the administrative center of the district. Its population as of the 2010 Census was 98, down from 112 recorded during the 2002 Census.

== Geography ==
Utaya is located at the feet of the Arga-Tas range, on the right bank of the Silyap River, a right tributary of the Ozhogina River.
