= Omok language =

Extinct Yukaghir language of northeast Russia

Omok
- Native to: Russia
- Region: Yakutia and Magadan Oblast
- Ethnicity: Omoks
- Extinct: after 1821
- Language family: Yukaghir: Tundra Yukaghir?; Omok

Language codes
- ISO 639-3: omk
- Glottolog: yuka1240
- Pre-contact distribution of Omok (yellow) and other Yukaghir languages

Omok is an extinct Yukaghir language of Siberia, part of a dialect continuum with two surviving languages, also referred to as an eastern dialect of Tundra Yukaghir. It was last spoken perhaps as late as the 18th century. A wordlist of Omok, as well as its sister language Chuvan, was recorded in 1821 by Fyodor Matyushkin.
