= Benjamin F. Wilson =

United States Army Medal of Honor recipient (1922–1988)

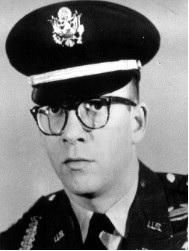
- Wilson as a captain, c. 1956
- Born: June 2, 1921; Vashon, Washington
- Died: March 1, 1988 (aged 66); Honolulu, Hawaii
- Burial place: National Memorial Cemetery of the Pacific, Honolulu, Hawaii
- Military career
- Allegiance: United States of America
- Branch: United States Army
- Service years: 1940–1960
- Rank: Major
- Units: 3rd Battalion, 31st Infantry Regiment, 7th Infantry Division
- Conflicts: World War II; Korean War
- Awards: Medal of Honor; Distinguished Service Cross; Purple Heart

Benjamin Franklin Wilson (June 2, 1921 – March 1, 1988) was a soldier in the United States Army during World War II and the Korean War. He received the Medal of Honor for his actions on June 5, 1951, during the UN May–June 1951 counteroffensive.

== Biography ==
Born at Vashon, Washington on June 2, 1921, he enlisted in the Army in the summer of 1940 and was stationed at Schofield Barracks, Hawaii, when the Japanese attacked Pearl Harbor. He went to Officer Candidate School at Fort Sill, Oklahoma in 1943 and was commissioned in the Field Artillery, but when the war was over, he resigned his commission and went home. His departure was only temporary. The Army suited him much better than Washington's lumber mills, and he was back in uniform nine months later. Because the Army was thinning its officer ranks and had no room for an inexperienced lieutenant, he enlisted as a private. He rose quickly through the ranks to become I Company's first sergeant by the summer of 1951.

First Sergeant Wilson's company was ordered to take the largest hill (later dubbed "Hell Hill") overlooking the Hwachon Reservoir on June 4, 1951. Wounded in action, Wilson was being carried down the hill on a stretcher as the battle neared its climax. When his stretcher-bearers set him down to rest, Wilson, in obvious pain, arose from the stretcher and trudged back up the hill without a word. The very next day, he distinguished himself in an I Company attack on a well-fortified position, earning himself the Medal of Honor. On June 6, just one day after that exploit, First Sergeant Ben Wilson killed 33 more Chinese soldiers with his rifle, bayonet, and hand grenades in another one-man assault. In the process, he reopened the wounds he suffered the day before and was finally evacuated to a hospital. He was again recommended for the Medal of Honor, but Army policy prohibited any man from being awarded more than one. Wilson received the Distinguished Service Cross instead and was commissioned when he returned to the States. He retired from the Army as a major in 1960 and died in Hawaii in 1988.

== Citations ==
=== Medal of Honor ===
Rank and organization: First Lieutenant (then M/Sgt.), U.S. Army Company I, 31st Infantry Regiment, 7th Infantry Division

Place and date: Near Hwach'on-Myon, Korea, June 5, 1951

Entered service at: Vashon, Wash. Birth: Vashon, Washington

G.O. No.: 69, September 23, 1954

Citation:

1st Lt. Wilson distinguished himself by conspicuous gallantry and indomitable courage above and beyond the call of duty in action against the enemy. Company I was committed to attack and secure commanding terrain stubbornly defended by a numerically superior hostile force emplaced in well-fortified positions. When the spearheading element was pinned down by withering hostile fire, he dashed forward and, firing his rifle and throwing grenades, neutralized the position denying the advance and killed 4 enemy soldiers manning submachineguns. After the assault platoon moved up, occupied the position, and a base of fire was established, he led a bayonet attack which reduced the objective and killed approximately 27 hostile soldiers. While friendly forces were consolidating the newly won gain, the enemy launched a counterattack and 1st Lt. Wilson, realizing the imminent threat of being overrun, made a determined lone-man charge, killing 7 and wounding 2 of the enemy, and routing the remainder in disorder. After the position was organized, he led an assault carrying to approximately 15 yards of the final objective, when enemy fire halted the advance. He ordered the platoon to withdraw and, although painfully wounded in this action, remained to provide covering fire. During an ensuing counterattack, the commanding officer and 1st Platoon leader became casualties. Unhesitatingly, 1st Lt. Wilson charged the enemy ranks and fought valiantly, killing 3 enemy soldiers with his rifle before it was wrested from his hands, and annihilating 4 others with his entrenching tool. His courageous delaying action enabled his comrades to reorganize and effect an orderly withdrawal. While directing evacuation of the wounded, he suffered a second wound, but elected to remain on the position until assured that all of the men had reached safety. 1st Lt. Wilson's sustained valor and intrepid actions reflect utmost credit upon himself and uphold the honored traditions of the military service.

=== Distinguished Service Cross ===
Rank and organization: First Lieutenant (then M/Sgt.), U.S. Army Company I, 31st Infantry Regiment, 7th Infantry Division

Place and date: Near Hwach'on-Myon, Korea, June 9, 1951

Entered service at: Vashon, Wash. Birth: Vashon, Washington

G.O. No.: , September 12, 1951

Citation:

The President of the United States of America, under the provisions of the Act of Congress approved July 9, 1918, takes pleasure in presenting the Distinguished Service Cross to Master Sergeant Benjamin Franklin Wilson, United States Army, for extraordinary heroism in connection with military operations against an armed enemy of the United Nations while serving with Company I, 3d Battalion, 31st Infantry Regiment, 7th Infantry Division. Master Sergeant Wilson distinguished himself by extraordinary heroism in action against enemy aggressor forces in the vicinity of Nodong-ni, Korea, on 9 June 1951. On that date, Sergeant Wilson’s company was advancing against heavily fortified enemy hill positions when a sudden and heavy volume of small-arms and automatic-weapons fire forced the men to seek cover. Sergeant Wilson, realizing the need for immediate and aggressive action so that the men could extricate themselves from their untenable positions, charged forward against the enemy emplacements single-handedly, firing his rifle rapidly and pitching grenades. Completely exposed to the concentrated fire of the enemy, he nevertheless succeeded in killing four of the enemy and in neutralizing a hostile bunker. His heroic actions so inspired his men that they renewed their assault and secured the objective. Immediately, the enemy launched a fierce counterattack against the newly gained positions and Sergeant Wilson once more left his position and engaged them at extremely close range. He personally killed five of the attacking enemy and laid down such a devastating volume of fire that the remainder were forced to withdraw after suffering heavy losses. The extraordinary heroism displayed by Master Sergeant Wilson on this occasion reflects the greatest credit on himself and is in keeping with the high traditions of the military service.

== Awards and Decorations ==
Major Wilson received the following awards for his service

Badge	Combat Infantryman Badge		
1st row	Medal of Honor		
2nd row	Distinguished Service Cross	Bronze Star Medal	Purple Heart with 1 Oak leaf cluster
3rd row	Army Commendation Medal	Army Good Conduct Medal	American Defense Service Medal with 'Foreign Service' Clasp
4th row	American Campaign Medal	Asiatic-Pacific Campaign Medal with 1 Campaign star	World War II Victory Medal
5th row	Army of Occupation Medal	National Defense Service Medal	Korean Service Medal with 2 Campaign stars
6th row	Armed Forces Reserve Medal	United Nations Service Medal Korea	Korean War Service Medal Retroactively Awarded, 2003
Unit Awards	Presidential Unit Citation		Korean Presidential Unit Citation

7th Infantry Division Insignia

== See also ==
- List of Medal of Honor recipients
- List of Korean War Medal of Honor recipients
