= Usun-Kyuyol, Verkhnekolymsky District, Sakha Republic =

Usun-Kyuyol Усун-Кюёль Уһун Күөл (Sakha)
- Selo
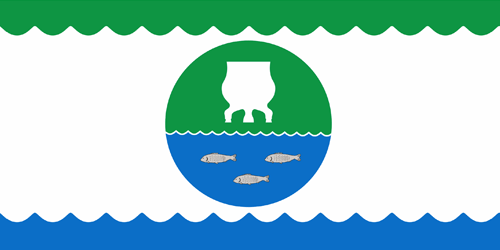
- Flag
- Interactive map of Usun-Kyuyol
- Location of Usun-Kyuyol Usun-Kyuyol (Sakha Republic)
- Coordinates: 66°20′43″N 150°30′29″E
- Country: Russia
- Federal subject: Sakha Republic
- Administrative district: Verkhnekolymsky District
- Rural okrugSelsoviet: Arylakhsky Rural Okrug
- Founded: 1942

Population (2010 Census)
  - Total: 499
  - Estimate (2021): 414 (−17%)

Administrative status
  - Capital of: Arylakhsky Rural Okrug

Municipal status
  - Municipal district: Verkhnekolymsky Municipal District
  - Rural settlement: Arylakhsky Rural Settlement
  - Capital of: Arylakhsky Rural Settlement
- Time zone: UTC+
- Postal code: 678772
- OKTMO ID: 98615405101

Usun-Kyuyol (Russian: Усун-Кюёль; Yakut: Уһун Күөл, Uhun Küöl) is a rural locality (a selo), the only inhabited locality, and the administrative center of Arylakhsky Rural Okrug of Verkhnekolymsky District in the Sakha Republic, Russia, located 110 kilometers (68 mi) from Zyryanka, the administrative center of the district. Its population as of the 2010 Census was 499, of whom 254 were male and 245 female, down from 575 recorded during the 2002 Census.
