= Pugu (deity) =

Pugu is the sun god of the Yukaghir of Siberia. Like many other solar gods, he was also seen as a god of justice and law. He is revered as the defender of the oppressed and the punisher of evil deeds. He kills evil demons with his sun-flail in hopes of bringing peace to his land.

He is also identified as Ye'loje, who looked after the oppressed and kept an eye on behavior and morals.
