= Southern Yukaghir language =

Yukaghir language of northeastern Russia

Southern Yukaghir
- Forest Yukaghir, Kolyma Yukaghir
- Одун ажуу
- Native to: Russia
- Region: Yakutia and Magadan Oblast
- Ethnicity: 1,800 Yukaghir (2020 census)
- Native speakers: 50 (2003) ca. 10 active (2010)
- Language family: Yukaghir: Southern Yukaghir

Language codes
- ISO 639-3: yux
- Glottolog: sout2750
- ELP: Forest Yukagir
- Glottopedia: Kolyma-Jukagirisch
- Pre-contact distribution of Southern Yukaghir (purple) and other Yukaghir languages

- Forest Yukaghir is classified as Critically Endangered by the UNESCO Atlas of the World's Languages in Danger.

The Southern, Kolyma or Forest Yukaghir language (Southern Yukaghir: одун ажуу) is one of two extant Yukaghir languages.

Last spoken in the forest zone near the sources of the Kolyma, divided between the Sakha Republic and the Magadan Oblast (around 65°N 153°E), previously in the wider area of the upper Kolyma region. In 2010 it had about 10 active speakers.

== Status ==
As of 2003, Kolyma Yukaghir is a moribund language, with only 50 remaining speakers with the language as their mother tongue. No speakers are monolingual, since all speak Russian and most speak Yakut. The first language for all Yukaghir under 60 is Russian, although many still have Kolyma Yukaghir as a mother tongue, and the average age for fluent, first-language speakers is 63 or more. In the past, multilingualism was common in the region, and Kolyma Yukaghir, Yakut, Even, and Chukchi all served as languages of intercultural communication, depending on the ethnicity of the addressee. Yukaghirs 60 and older follow this custom. Middle-aged Yukaghir, from 41 to 60, still have Yukaghir as their mother tongue and speak to elders in it, although they use Russian for all other communication. The youngest generation of Yukaghir is almost entirely monolingual in Russian, the only language used at school. Although Kolyma Yukaghir has been taught at school since 1985, the youngest generation still know little to none of the language.

== Classification ==
The relationship of the Yukaghir languages with other language families is uncertain, though it has been suggested that they are distantly related to the Uralic languages, thus forming the putative Uralic–Yukaghir language family.

Kolyma and Tundra Yukaghir are the only two remnants of what used to be one of the dominant language families of northeastern Siberia, spreading from the River Anadyr in the east to the River Lena in the west. On the basis of the evidence of early sources, it can be assumed that there existed a Yukaghir dialect continuum, with what is today Kolyma Yukaghir and Tundra Yukaghir at the extremes. Kolyma Yukaghir and Tundra Yukaghir are not mutually intelligible.

== Phonology ==
All charts are from Maslova (2003).

=== Vowels ===
	Front				Central		Back	
	unrounded		rounded		Central		Back	
	short	long	short	long	short	long	short	long
Close	i	iː			(ɨ)		u	uː
Mid	e	eː	ø	øː	ə		o	oː
Open					a	aː		

- /ɨ/ is only found in Russian loanwords, e.g. /starɨj/ 'old'.
- /ə/ is a short reduced vowel that occurs after the first syllable and often harmonizes to other vowels or is pronounced as the schwa.
- Kolyma Yukaghir demonstrates contrastive vowel length.

=== Consonants ===
		Bilabial	Alveolar	Post- alveolar	Palatal	Velar	Uvular	Glottal
Nasal		m	n		ɲ	ŋ		
Plosive/ Affricate	voiceless	p	t		tɕ	k	q	(ʔ)
Plosive/ Affricate	voiced	(b)	d		dʑ	ɡ	ʁ ~ ɢ	
Fricative	voiceless		(s)	ʃ	(ç)	(x)	ʁ ~ ɢ	
Fricative	voiced		(z)	ʒ	(ʝ)	(ɣ)	ʁ ~ ɢ	
Approximant	median				j	w		
Approximant	lateral		l		ʎ			
Trill			r					

- The glottal stop is a marginal phoneme in some interjections, e.g. /maʔ/ 'take!'
- [b, x, ɣ, ç, ʝ] occur as allophones of /w, q, ʁ, tɕ, dʑ/.
- Word-final /w/ is realized as [u].
- /ʁ/ is realized as a plosive [ɢ] after /ŋ/.
- /s, z/ only occur in Russian loanwords.

== Writing system ==
In the 1980s, Uluro Ado (Gavril Kurilov) developed a writing system for the language, based on the Russian alphabet and the Yakut alphabet.

Southern Yukaghir alphabet
А а	Б б	В в	Г г	Ҕ ҕ	Д д	Җ җ	Е е	Ә ә
Ё ё	Ж ж	З з	И и	Й й	К к	Қ қ	Л л	Ль ль
М м	Н н	Нь нь	Ҥ ҥ	О о	Ө ө	П п	Р р	С с
Сь сь	Т т	У у	Ф ф	Х х	Ц ц	Ч ч	Ш ш	Щ щ
Ъ ъ	Ы ы	Ь ь	Э э	Ю ю	Я я

== Grammar ==
Both Yukaghir languages have residual vowel harmony and a complex phonotactics of consonants, rich agglutinative morphology and are strictly head-final. They have practically no finite subordination and very few coordinate structures. Yukaghir has a split intransitive alignment system based on discourse-pragmatic features. In absence of narrow focus, the system is organised on a nominative–accusative basis; when focused, direct objects and subjects of intransitive verbs are co-aligned (special focus case, special focus agreement).

The grammar of Kolyma Yukaghir, like that of its sibling Tundra Yukaghir, is agglutinative. Most forms of declension in the language come about by means of suffixing, with only a handful of prefixes expressing certain types of grammatical aspect.

Word order is usually verb-final, but the overall order of constituents is determined by their pragmatic roles; the language is strongly head-final and is pro-drop.

The language exhibits strong dialectal and even idiolectal variation as well as a heavy influence from Russian and Yakut; generational differences in use are also quite distinct. Russian influence is especially strong, with Russian vocabulary borrowed wholesale without any phonological alteration, unlike Yakut borrowings, which are altered to match native Yukaghir phonology.

=== Nouns ===
Kolyma Yukaghir nouns inflect for number, case and possession according to the following paradigm:

STEM + [NUM]/POSS + [CASE]

The corresponding markers are suffixed to the stem. This nominal morphology is compatible with nouns as well as nominalized verb forms, various pronominal forms and non-possessives. Case, number and possessive forms are shown below with the noun āče (deer).

Case	Singular	Plural	Possession
Nominative	āče	āče-pul	āče-gi
Predicative	āče-lek	āče-p-lek	[null]
Accusative	āče-gele	āče-pul-gele	āče-de-gele
Instrumental	āče-le	āče-p-le	āče-de-le
Dative	āče-ŋin	āče-pul-ŋin	āče-de-ŋin
Ablative	āče-get	āče-pul-get	āče-de-get
Prolative	āče-gen	āče-pul-gen	āče-de-gen
Comitative	āče-n’e	āče-pul-n’e	āče-de-n’e

Number

Nouns are inherently singular and marked for plural. This plural affix, -p(ul)- for nouns ending in [e] or [o] and -pe- for all others, comes after the noun stem and before other affixes. With the singular exception of the word uø (“child”), which becomes uø-r-pe, these plural forms are highly regular.

Possessive

Possession is expressed via the affix -d(e)-, which is positioned between the noun stem and case ending, in the same position as, and taking the place of, the number suffix.

Since possession is expressed independently of grammatical number, the meaning of a fully inflected possessive form can sometimes be ambiguous, as in the example below:

ače-p-ki
deer-PL-3(NOM)
“his/her [many] deer” / “their [single] deer” / “their [many] deer”

Possession in Kolyma Yukaghir can denote in-group membership and kinship roles as well as direct ownership.

Case marking and focus

Nouns are marked for nine grammatical cases. The nominative is unmarked while the others are expressed via suffix which follows the possessive marker in possessive noun forms. Case is dominated by an ergative system of focus which overrides subsequent case marking in certain instances. For example, in clauses in which the subject is in first or second person and the direct object is in third person, both occur in unmarked Nominative case, as in:

met tolow kudede
I(NOM) deer(NOM) kill(TR:1:SG)
“I killed a deer.”

Nominative case represents the subject of an intransitive verb or otherwise the agent of a clause, depending upon the context of focus. Noun stems are inherently nominative and unmarked.

met tet-ul juø
I(NOM) you-ACC see(TR:1SG)
“I saw you.”

Predicative case, expressed by the suffix -(le)k, marks the nominative predicate or otherwise the focus of a clause.

met tet-in šaqale-lek kej-te-me
I you-DAT fox-PRED give-FUT-OF:1SG
“I will give you a fox.”

Accusative refers to the direct object of a transitive verb. It takes the suffix -gele.

čolhorā-die-gele tā šašil-ge ī-de-m
hare- there snare-LOC get.caught-CAUS-TR:3SG
“He caught the hare in the snare there.”

Instrumental case, using the -le suffix implies that the referent is facilitated or acted upon, roughly equivalent to “by means of X” in English.

tāt n’umud’ī-le čine-j-m
CA ax-INSTR chop-PFV-TR:3SG
“Then he chopped it with an ax.”

In clauses where the direct object is represented by an indefinite nominal predicate, this case is used instead of accusative, as in:

tudel tolow-le kudde-m
he(NOM) deer-INSTR kill-TR:3SG
“He killed a deer.”

Dative case marks the indirect object of a verb using the -ŋin suffix.

tintaŋ pulut mon-i šaqale-ŋin
that old.man say-INTR:3SG fox-DAT
“that old man said to the fox”

It can also be used with the Russian-borrowed do (“until”) to form a temporal construction.

do ugujel-ŋin mie-de-ŋi
until morning-DAT wait-DETR-3PL:INTR
“They waited until the morning.”

Comitative case, marked by the suffix -n’e, is used to link constituents or to indicate a secondary actor in a joint or reciprocal event; in this way it is somewhat similar to “X and X” phrases in English.

irk-in omnī mod-l’el pulut terike-de-n’e
one-ATTR family sit-INFR(3/SG) old.man old.woman-POSS-COM
“There lived one family, an old man and his wife.”

The Locative case suffix -ge expresses spatial relationships or directed action relating to the English pronominal forms “in,” “below,” “near” and “next to.”

irk-in jalhil-ge ninge-j omnī-k ed’-u-t madā-l’el-ŋi-l
one-ATTR lake-LOC many-ATTR family-PRED [live-0-SS:IPFV] reside-INFR-3PL-SF
“There were many people near one lake.”

The Ablative case suffix -get indicates movement away from a location.

qodōbe-get čirčege-s’
bed-ABL spring.up-PFV:INTR:3SG
“He sprang up from the bed.”

Finally, the Prolative case suffix -gen signifies movement along or within a location.

čuge-de-gen qon-ŋi
trace-POSS-PROL go-3PL:INTR
“They went along his trace.”

=== Verbs ===
As with nouns, verbs in Kolyma Yukaghir are formed by the addition of suffixes to a verb stem. Unlike in English and most other European languages, the difference between these two parts of speech is somewhat indistinct and various markers can nominalize a verb stem. Of note, Kolyma Yukaghir does not feature adjectives as a distinct part of speech; attributive markers are added to verb stems which in turn modify nouns. Verbs inflect to express focus, negation/affirmation, person, aspect and tense according to the following paradigm:

[AFF] + [IRLS] + [NEG] + STEM-INF/PRSP-PL-FUT + [agreement]

Transitive and intransitive verb stems take separate sets of affixes corresponding to the categories in the paradigm above. The entire Transitive Verb paradigm is illustrated below with the verb juø (“to see”) and the Intransitive paradigm with šohie (“to disappear”):

	Main Forms		Object-Focus	
Person	Non-Future	Future	Non-Future	Future
1SG	juø	juø-t	juø-me	juø-te-me
2SG	juø-me-k	juø-te-me-k	juø-me	juø-te-me
3SG	juø-m	juø-te-m	juø-me-le	juø-te-m-le
1PL	juø-j	juø-te-j	juø-l	juø-te-l
2PL	juø-met	juø-te-met	juø-met	juø-te-met
3PL	juø-ŋā	juø-ŋi-te-m	juø-ŋi-le	juø-ŋi-te-m-le

	Main Forms		Subject-Focus	
Person	Non-Future	Future	Non-Future	Future
1SG	šohie-je	šohie-te-je	šohie-l	šohie-te-l
2SG	šohie-je-k	šohie-te-je-k	šohie-l	šohie-te-l
3SG	šohie-j	šohie-te-j	šohie-l	šohie-te-l
1PL	šohie-je-l’i	šohie-te-j-l’i	šohie-l	šohie-te-l
2PL	šohie-je-met	šohie-te-j-met	šohie-l	šohie-te-l
3PL	šohie-ŋi	šohie-ŋi-te-j	šohie-ŋi-l	šohie-ŋi-te-l

Thus, a fully declined Kolyma Yukaghir verb, demonstrating many possible semantic nuances, would look like the following example:

el+iks’ī-l’el-ŋi
NEG+catch-INFR-3PL:INTR
“(they) did not catch”

Negation and affirmation

Verbs are negated with the prefix el-. The affirmation prefix me- serves as an emphatic.

Tense and Mood

The only specific tense distinction in Kolyma Yukaghir is Future versus Non-Future, which is unmarked. Past tense forms can be expressed periphrastically by rearranging constituents, as in:

ā-l-bed-ek
make-ANR-RELNR-PRED
“[somebody] has made”

Morphologically, tense and mood distinctions are formed by the addition of a single suffix, or two suffixes in the case of hypothetical forms. The language distinguishes several different tense/mood forms, including Future, Irrealis, Inferential, Prospective and Hypothetical, all of which are contrasted with unmarked non-Future and non-Inferential forms. The corresponding suffixes, with the verb ā (“to make”), are listed below:

Unmarked	ā-m
Future	ā-te-m
Irrealis	m-et+ā-m
Inferential	ā-l’el-u-m
Prospective	ā-moži-m
Hypothetical	ā-l’el-te-m

The Future affix -t(e) describes events in the literal future as well as other nuances such as desirability, hypotheticality and recommendation or instruction. This form can also be used to express surprise or doubt.

tuøn qamie-t-u-m
this help-FUT-0-TR:3SG
“This will help.”

Irrealis primarily describes counterfactual situations but also, and less commonly, desirability or potentiality. Unlike other mood and tense forms, it is expressed by a prefix, et-.

taŋnugi anil-pe čumut ot+amde-ŋi
CA fish-PL all IRLS+die-3PL:INTR
“Then the fishes would all have died.”

The inferential suffix -l’el is used, in non-Future, for narration or to transmit hearsay.

šašet el+ūj-ŋide čumu ā-l’el-u-m
[now NEG+work-SS:COND] all make-INFR-0-TR:3SG
“If he is not working now, he must have finished.”

The prospective suffix -moži signifies a prediction based on real world knowledge.

omo-če pod’erqo ō-moži
[good-ATTR] day COP-PRSP(3SG)
“It is going to be a good day.”

“Hypothetical” refers to the inferential suffix -l’el, used with future marking, expressing purely hypothetical situations.

met emej es’ie tā-ŋide qol-l’el-ŋi-te-j
my mother father there DIR go-INFR-3PL-FUT-INTR:3SG
“My mother and father must have gone there.”

Agreement

The final element of the inflection paradigm is an agreement suffix. Verbs agree according to person, transitivity and number with the subject.

Aspect

Grammatical aspect is expressed by markers that affix between the verb stem and other endings. There are four specific aspectual distinctions, illustrated below with the verb ā (“to make”).

Aspect	Marker	Example	English
Imperfective	-nu-	ā-nu-m	"he was making"
Habitual	-nun(nu)-	ā-nunnu-m	"he used to make"
Ingressive	-ā/ie-	ā-l-ā-m	"he began to make"
Resultative	-ō(l)-	ā-l-ō-j	"it is made"

Imperative, prohibitive and interrogative forms

Verbs expressing imperative, prohibitive or interrogative mood, whether transitive or intransitive, use the following paradigm:

[NEG] + STEM-PL-IMP/PROH = [agreement]

The full range of these verb forms is illustrated below, with jaqa (“to arrive”):

	Imperative		Prohibitive	Interrogative
Person	Simple	Complex	Prohibitive	Interrogative
2SG	jaqa-k	jaqa-ge-k	el-l’aqa’le’k	jaqa-k
2PL	jaqa-ŋi-k	jaqa-ŋi-ge-k	el-l’aqa-ŋi-le-k	jaqa-met
3SG	jaqa-ge-n		el-l’aqa-ge-n	jaqa
3PL	jaqa-ŋi-ge-n		el-l’aqa-ŋi-ge-n	jaqa-ŋi
1PL	jaqa-ge		el-l’aqa-ge	jaqa-l-ōk
1SG				jaqa-m

Nonfinite verbs and converbs

Kolyma Yukaghir has a richly developed system of nonfinite verb forms, illustrated in the following chart with the verb šubeže (“to run”):

Form	Type	Example	English
Action Nominal	Nonfinite	šubeže-l	“a situation of running”
Result Nominal	Nonfinite	šubež-ōl	“a situation of having run”
Subject Nominal	Nonfinite	šubeže-jōn	“one who is running”
Relative Nominal	Nonfinite	šubeže-j-ben	“(someone else) who is running”
Attributive	Nonfinite	šubeže-j	“(the action of) running”
Imperfective Converb	Same-Subject	šubeže-t	“while running”
Perfective Converb	Same-Subject	šubeže-lle	“having run”
Conditional Converb	Same-Subject	šubeže-ŋide	“if (X) runs”
Ordinary Converb	Different-Subject	šubeže-de-ge	“when he was running”
Conditional Converb	Different-Subject	šubeže-de-h-ne	“if he runs”

Converbs are used for a broad array of syntactic functions. Chief among these is clause chaining, which is describing sequences of related events or forming conditional verb constructions, as in:

aŋdile šar meru-še-t mudde-s’
[hawk something fly-CAUS-SS:IPFV] [pass-INTR:3SG]
“A hawk passed by, flying and carrying something.”

=== Personal pronouns ===
There are three grammatical persons in Kolyma Yukaghir. Plurality is marked by a pronominal stem change. Pronouns are declined in the same way as nouns, for case, possession and number (singular and plural). The complete set of personal pronouns and attendant case suffixes are shown below:

	Singular	Plural
1st	met	mit
2nd	tet	tit
3rd	tude	titte

Case	Suffix
Nominative	[null]
Predicative	-ek
Pron. Acc.	-ul
Accusative	-kele/gele
Dative	-in
Locative	-ke
Ablative	-ket
Prolative	-ken
Comitative	-n’e
Possessive	[null]
Free Poss.	-l’e
Intensified	-id’ie

Notably, there are no attested instrumental pronoun forms in the language.

Possessive Pronouns

When possession is marked pronominally rather than morphologically, pronouns take a specific possessive suffix that corresponds to an English possessive pronoun. “Free Possessive” refers to a group or set of possessed objects rather than to a single item. These forms are obsolescent and rarely encountered.

In the modern form of the language, the free possessive is commonly replicated using the Russian loanword sam (“self”) as a suffix.

met+sam met+šørile-š-te-je
I+self REFL-paint-CAUS-FUT-INTR:1SG
“I will paint myself.”

Intensified form

Pronouns can take the suffix -id’ie which functions in the same way as a case marker and roughly corresponds to the English reflexive form (myself, itself, and so on).

mit-id’ie pon’ō-jīl’i
we-INTS remain-INTR:1PL
“We (ourselves) remained alone.”

Attributive and qualitative forms

The lines distinguishing individual parts of speech other than verbs and nouns in Kolyma Yukaghir are not as clearly defined as in European languages. Verbs, for example, can take the -n or the action nominal -l suffixes, yielding verb forms that functionally modify nouns, as in:

kel-u-l šoromo mon-i
[come-0-ANR] man say-INTR:3SG
“The man who came said…”

Attributive verb phrases are the primary means of building relative clauses, as in:

purk-in šoromo lē-je šoromo
[seven-ATTR person eat-ATTR] person
“a person who has eaten seven people”

=== Postpositions ===
Kolyma Yukaghir utilizes postpositions. They can have spatial or temporal meanings (or both), and can take locative suffixes to produce subtle changes in these meanings. In the following examples, the postposition jolā is translated as either “behind” or “after” depending on the presence of a locative (in this case, prolative) marker:

pølbiel jolā tāt abudā-je
hammock behind CA lie.down-INTR:1SG
“then I lay down behind a hammock”

tet jolā-t mit kel-t-īl’i
you behind-PROL we come-FUT-INTR:1SG
“We’ll go after you.”

== Sample text ==
An interlinear glossed sample:

Yarqadan

Recorded by Ljudmila Zhukova from Ljubov' Demina in 1988.

пэ аан-дә-пә-гәт йарқә поҗольә-гәт пойньаа-сьии-л туде оозии-гәлә Йарқәдән емей ой миидә чурууҗә қон-таа-сьии-ну-м.
mountain under-3-PL-ABL ice shining-ABL white-DEL-AN he.GEN water-ACC Yarqadan (Note: (*йарқә-д-ун lit. "ice river")) mother stream along quietly go-TR-DEL-IMPF-TR.3SG
"From the bottom of the mountains, from the whiteness of the ice our mother Yarqadan quietly carries its shining water downstream."
