= Yukaghir languages =

Family of two languages in far northeastern Russia

Yukaghir
- Geographic distribution: Russian Far East
- Ethnicity: Yukaghirs, Chuvans, Anauls
- Native speakers: 516 (mostly Tundra, 2020 census)
- Linguistic classification: One of the world's primary language families
- Subdivisions: Northern; Omok †; Chuvan †; Southern

Language codes
- Glottolog: yuka1259
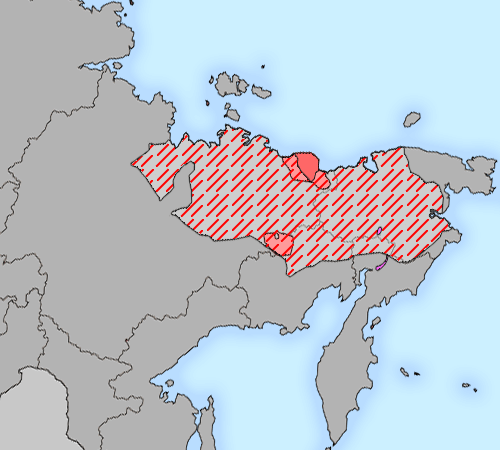
- Extent of Yukaghir languages in the 17th (hatched) and 20th (solid) centuries

The Yukaghir languages (/ˈjuːkəɡɪər/ YOO-kə-geer or /juːkəˈɡɪər/ yoo-kə-GEER; also Yukagir, Jukagir) are a small family of two closely related surviving languages—Tundra and Kolyma Yukaghir—spoken by the Yukaghir in the Russian Far East living in the basin of the Kolyma River. Estimates of the number of speakers in the 21st century range from several dozen to about 500 (see below for details). The entire family, as such, is regarded as moribund.

== History and geography ==
Tundra and Kolyma Yukaghir are the only two remnants of what used to be one of the dominant languages (or language families) of northeastern Siberia, spreading from the River Anadyr in the east to the River Lena in the west. On the basis of the evidence of early sources, it can be assumed that there existed a Yukaghir dialect continuum, with what is today Tundra Yukaghir and Kolyma Yukaghir at the extremes.

The Yukaghir have experienced a language shift since the early 20th century, with a majority of speakers also speaking Russian and Yakut. In 1993, Juha Janhunen estimated the number of speakers for each Yukaghir language to be less than 50, although the number of persons reporting their Yukaghir ethnicity may be substantially higher. The number of Yukaghir speakers fell from 604 in the 2002 Russian census to 516 who reported speaking it as their native language in 2020–2021.

== Members ==
The two extant varieties of Yukaghir are:

- Tundra Yukaghir (Northern Yukaghir, also known as Wadul): 30 to 150 speakers in 1989. Last spoken in the tundra belt extending between the lower Indigirka to the lower Kolyma basin (69°N 154°E). Formerly spoken in a much wider area extending to the Lena basin in the west.
- Kolyma Yukaghir (Forest Yukaghir, Southern Yukaghir, also known as Odul): 5 to 10 speakers in 2009. Last spoken in the forest zone near the sources of the Kolyma, divided between the Sakha Republic and the Magadan Oblast (around 65°N 153°E), previously in the wider area of the upper Kolyma region.
  Distribution of the Yukaghir languages and internal tribal divisions in the 17th century.

Extinct varieties include Omok and Chuvan, which survived until the 19th century.

=== Grammatical features ===
The two Yukaghir languages share only a relatively small part of the vocabulary and are not mutually intelligible. The basic grammatical structures, however, are very similar. Both languages have residual vowel harmony and a complex phonotactics of consonants. Both have rich agglutinative morphology and are strictly head-final. There is practically no finite subordination and very few coordinate structures. The most spectacular feature of TY and KY grammar is the split intransitive alignment system based on discourse-pragmatic features. In the absence of narrow focus, the system is organised on the nominative–accusative basis; when focused, direct objects and subjects of intransitive verbs are co-aligned (special focus case, special focus agreement).

=== Lexical differences ===
Some lexical differences between Kolyma Yukaghir and Tundra Yukaghir:

gloss	Kolyma Yukaghir	Tundra Yukaghir
one	irkēj	mōrqōñ
two	ataqlōj	kijōñ
five	iñhañbōj	imd’ald’añ
many	niŋel	pojōl
all	t’umu	jawnə
day	pod’erqə	t’ajləŋ
sun	jelōd’ə	jerpəjəŋ
water	ōd’ī	lawjəŋ
fish	anil	al’həŋ
reindeer	at’ə	il’eŋ
dog	pubel	laməŋ
person	šoromə	ködeŋ
people	omnī	t’īŋ
eye	aŋd’ə	jȫd’īŋ
tooth	todī	sal’hərīŋ
night	emil	t’iŋit’əl
foot	nojl	t’ohul
name	ñū	kirijəŋ
to sit	modo-	sahañe-
to kill	kuledə-	puñī-
to die	amdə-	jabə-
to know	leidī-	kurilī-
to drink	ožə-	law-

== Text sample (Northern Yukaghir) ==
Article 1 of the Universal Declaration of Human Rights:

Cyrillic:

Көдэҥ тэн – ньидитэ бандьэ параwааньэрэҥ тудэ чуҥдэн ньилдьилэк эннулҥинь-мэдьуолнуни. Көдэҥ энмун чундэ мэ льэй, таатльэр лукундьии ньинэмдьийилпэ дитэ эннуйуол-мораwньэҥи.

Latin:

Ködeng ten – n'idite band'e parawaan'ereng tude chungden n'ild'ilek ennulngin'-med'uolnuni. Ködeng enmun chunde me l'ey, taatl'er lukund'ii n'inemd'iyilpe dite ennuyuol-morawn'engi.

English translation:

All human beings are born free and equal in dignity and rights. They are endowed with reason and conscience and should act towards one another in a spirit of brotherhood.

== Possible relationship to other language families ==
The relationship of the Yukaghir languages with other language families is uncertain, though it has been suggested that they are distantly related to the Uralic languages, thus forming the putative Uralic–Yukaghir language family.

Michael Fortescue argued that Yukaghir is related to the Eskimo-Aleut languages along with Uralic languages, forming the Uralo-Siberian language family.

== See also ==
- Paleosiberian languages
- Indigenous peoples of Siberia
- Uralic languages
- Uralic–Yukaghir languages
- Yukaghir people
