= Arga-Tas =

Russian mountain chain

- Арга-Тас / Арҕаа Таас
- Location within Sakha Republic

Highest point
- Peak: Unnamed
- Elevation: 2,021 m (6,631 ft)
- Coordinates: 65°0′N 149°0′E

Dimensions
- Length: 100 km (62 mi) NNW / SSE

Geography
- Location: Sakha Republic, Far Eastern Federal District
- Parent range: Chersky Range, East Siberian System

Climbing
- Easiest route: From Utaya

The Arga-Tas (Russian: Арга-Тас; Yakut: Арҕаа Таас, romanized: Arğaa Taas) is a mountain range in far North-eastern Russia. Administratively it is part of the Sakha Republic (Yakutia), Russian Federation. The range extends along the southwestern part of the Upper Kolyma District. The village of Utaya, administrative center of the Utainsky Rural Okrug is located at the feet of the range.

== Geography ==
The Arga-Tas is a subrange of the Chersky Range mountain system. It extends from NNW to SSE for almost 100 kilometres (62 mi) at the southern end of the Moma Range and west of the Kolyma River valley. The Rassokha, a tributary of the Yasachnaya River, cuts across the range in its middle course.

The highest point of the Arga-Tas is an ultra-prominent peak that is 2,400 metres (7,900 ft) high.

== See also ==
- List of ultras of Northeast Asia
