= Zyryanka Airport =

Airport in the Sakha Republic of Russia

- IATA: ZKP; ICAO: UESU

Summary
- Serves: Zyryanka, Verkhnekolymsky District, Sakha Republic, Russia
- Elevation AMSL: 43 m / 140 ft
- Coordinates: 65°44′56″N 150°53′18″E

Maps
- Sakha Republic in Russia

- Location of the airport in the Sakha Republic

Runways
Direction	Length		Surface
Direction	m	ft	Surface
16/34	1,800	5,906	Concrete
- Sources: GCM, STV, OurAirports

Zyryanka Airport (IATA: ZKP, ICAO: UESU) is the main airport serving the locality of Zyryanka, Verkhnekolymsky District, in the Sakha Republic of Russia. When it cannot be used, the Zyryanka West Airport complements it.

Google Earth images of June, 2017, show the west runway covered by floodwaters, possibly destroyed.

== Airlines and destinations ==
Airlines	Destinations
Polar Airlines	Yakutsk

== See also ==
- List of airports in Russia
