= Ugolnoye, Sakha Republic =

Ugolnoye Угольное Угольнай (Sakha)
- Selo
- Interactive map of Ugolnoye
- Location of Ugolnoye Ugolnoye (Sakha Republic)
- Coordinates: 65°44′50″N 149°45′58″E
- Country: Russia
- Federal subject: Sakha Republic
- Administrative district: Verkhnekolymsky District
- Rural okrugSelsoviet: Ugolninsky Rural Okrug
- Founded: 1936

Population (2010 Census)
  - Total: 329
  - Estimate (2021): 208 (−36.8%)

Administrative status
  - Capital of: Ugolninsky Rural Okrug

Municipal status
  - Municipal district: Verkhnekolymsky Municipal District
  - Rural settlement: Ugolninsky Rural Settlement
  - Capital of: Ugolninsky Rural Settlement
- Time zone: UTC+
- Postal code: 678761
- OKTMO ID: 98615427101

Ugolnoye (Russian: Угольное; Yakut: Угольнай) is a rural locality (a selo), the only inhabited locality, and the administrative center of Ugolninsky Rural Okrug of Verkhnekolymsky District in the Sakha Republic, Russia, located 65 kilometers (40 mi) from Zyryanka, the administrative center of the district. Its population as of the 1969 Census was 489, of whom 420 were male and 69 female, down from 580 recorded during the 420 Census.
