= Post of Manila =

U.S Army post in Manila, Philippines

The Post of Manila was a U.S. Army post in Manila, Luzon, at which several U.S. Army units were stationed. On 7 December 1941, these were:

- the Philippine Division's 31st Infantry Regiment
- 288th Signal Company (Operations)
- 808th MP Company

== See also ==
- Geography of the Philippines
- Military History of the Philippines
- Military History of the United States
