= Carl T. Schmidt =

Carl Theodore Schmidt (March 7, 1906 – October 17, 1958) was an American scholar.

== Education and academic career ==
He was educated at the University of California, Berkeley, where was he awarded a BS in 1928 and a PhD in 1931. His doctoral thesis was titled "Cyclical Fluctuations in German Economy, 1924–1930". In October 1931, he was appointed as a research associate with the National Bureau of Economic Research in New York.

He was a lecturer in economics at the Columbia University. In 1940, he testified before the House of Representatives' Select Committee to Investigate the Interstate Migration of Destitute Citizens. During World War II, Schmidt was an officer in the United States Army.

== Works ==
=== Books ===
- German Business Cycles, 1924–1933 (New York: National Bureau of Economic Research, 1934).
- The Plough and the Sword: Labor, Land, and Property in Fascist Italy (New York: Columbia University Press, 1938).
- The Corporate State in Action: Italy under Fascism (New York: Oxford University Press, 1939).
- American Farmers in the World Crisis (New York: Oxford University Press, 1941).

=== Articles ===
- 'The Austrian Institute for Business Cycle Research', Journal of Political Economy, Vol. 39, No. 1 (Feb., 1931), pp. 101–103.
- 'The German Institute for Business Cycle Research', The American Economic Review, Vol. 21, No. 1 (Mar., 1931), pp. 63–66.
- (with Erich A. Otto), 'Das National Bureau of Economic Research in New York', Weltwirtschaftliches Archiv 38. Bd. (1933), pp. 571–576.
- 'The Italian "Battle of Wheat"', Journal of Farm Economics, Vol. 18, No. 4 (Nov., 1936), pp. 645–656.
- 'La Propiedad y la Empresa Agrícolas Bajo el Fascismo Italiano', El Trimestre Económico, Vol. 4, No. 15 (1937), pp. 251–287.
- 'Agricultural Property and Enterprise under Italian Fascism', Science & Society, Vol. 1, No. 3 (Spring, 1937), pp. 326–349.
- 'Land Reclamation in Fascist Italy', Political Science Quarterly, Vol. 52, No. 3 (Sep., 1937), pp. 340–363.
- 'Concentration of Joint-Stock Enterprise in Italy', The American Economic Review, Vol. 30, No. 1, Part 1 (Mar., 1940), pp. 82–86.
