= Operation Military Kids =

Program for children of U.S. military members

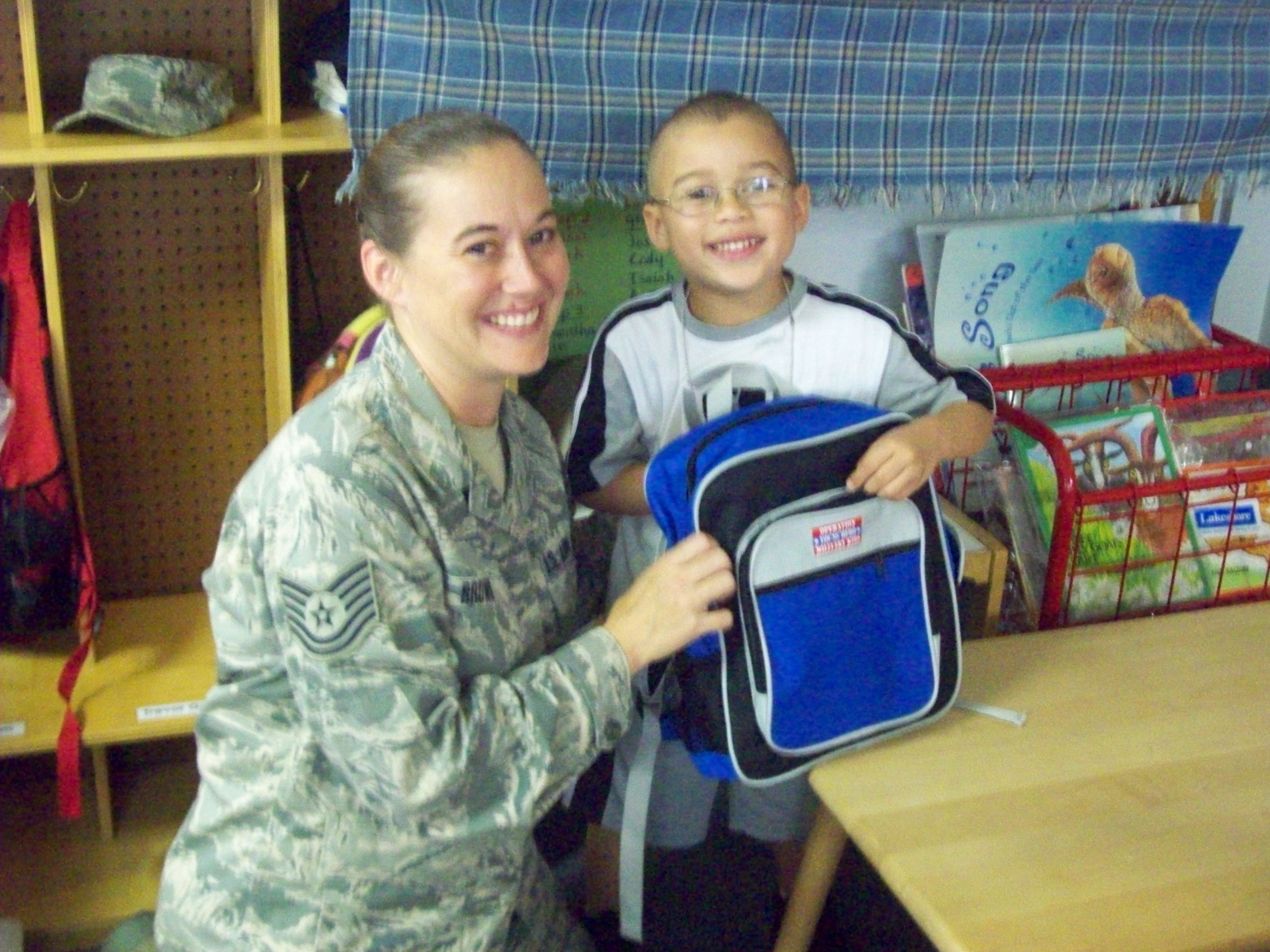
Military youth and his mother receiving a hero pack (2007).

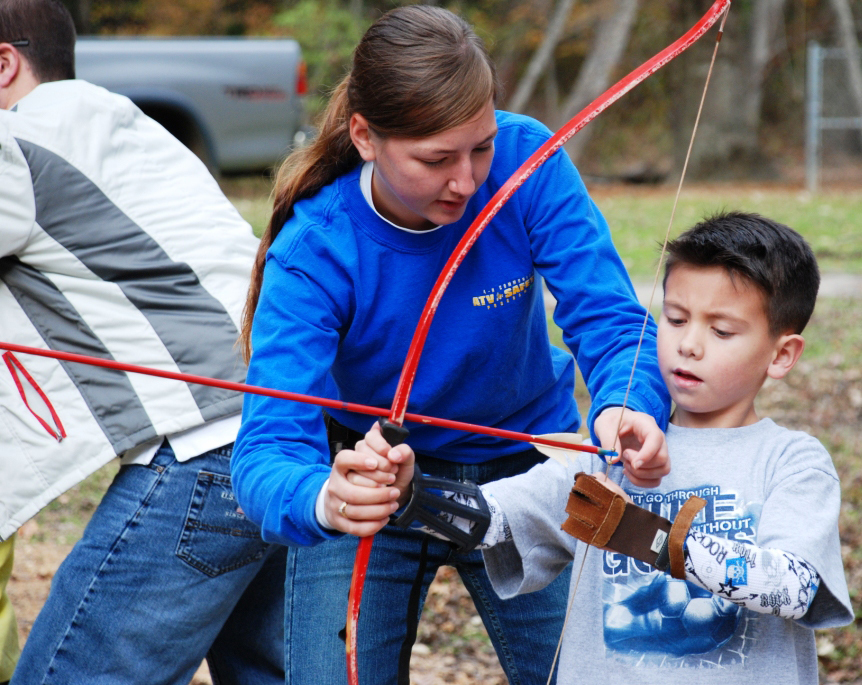
4th annual Operation Military Kids, Camp Lagniappe in Pollock, La., Nov. 23.

Operation Military Kids (OMK) is a program targeted to the children of members of the United States Armed Forces who are deployed overseas.

== Background ==
Operation Military Kids, through a cooperation with 4-H, the United States National Guard and the U.S. Army Reserve, was a program created a community support network for military youth "in our own backyard" when soldier parents are deployed. It delivered recreation, social, and educational programs for military youth living in civilian communities. It also supported military kids coping with the stress of knowing their deployed parents may be in harm's way. Another function was collaborating with schools to ensure staff are attuned to the unique needs of military students. The program educated the public on the impact of the deployment cycle on soldiers, families, kids, and the community as a whole. Finally, it became a part of the ongoing 4-H Program in the locations where there are military families. Each state in the United States had an OMK representative who worked with other state partners to deliver programming, support and opportunities for the Military Kids in their respective states. Operation: Military Kids worked with every branch of the service, both active duty and reservists. The program ended March 15, 2015.

In April 2015, OMK launched the Social Media campaign PurpleUp where kids of Soldiers were photographed in army clothes, with the intent to harvest pride among the Soldiers' children demographics.
