= Chuvan language =

Extinct Yukaghir language of Siberia

Chuvan
- Chuvantsy
- Native to: Russia
- Region: Anadyr River basin of Chukotka Autonomous Okrug
- Ethnicity: 900 Chuvans (2020)
- Extinct: late 19th century
- Language family: Yukaghir: Eastern Yukaghir?; Chuvan

Language codes
- ISO 639-3: xcv
- Glottolog: chuv1256
- Pre-contact distribution of Chuvan (red) and other Yukaghir languages

Chuvan (Russian: Чуванский язык) is an extinct Yukaghir language of Siberia, part of a dialect continuum with the two surviving languages. It was most likely last spoken in the 19th century. Already in the 1860s, no more speakers of Chuvan could be located. Chuvan was widespread in the lower region of the Anadyr River (near Chuvanskoye), spoken by Chuvans. The translations of 22 sentences, recorded in 1781 by I. Benzig, and 210 words written by Fyodor Matyushkin in 1821 have been preserved. Chuvan descendants are known to have spoken a distinct dialect of Russian.
