= Yukaghir people =

Ethnic group in the Kolyma basin of the Russian Far East

Yukaghir
деткиль, одул, вадул, алаи
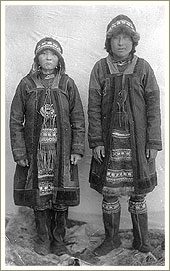
- Yukaghirs from Yakutia, 1905.

Regions with significant populations
- Russia: Sakha: 1267; Chukotka: 205; Magadan Oblast: 70: 1,802
- Ukraine: 12
- United States: 5

Languages
- Yukaghir, Russian, Yakut

Religion
- Shamanism, Russian Orthodoxy

The Yukaghirs, or Yukagirs (Northern Yukaghir: вадул, деткиль (wadul, detkil), Russian: юкаги́ры), are a Siberian ethnic group in the Russian Far East, living in the basin of the Kolyma River.

Modern Yukaghirs are thought to be descendants of the late Neolithic Ymyyakhtakh culture.

== Geographic distribution ==
Settlement of Yukaghirs in the Far Eastern Federal District by urban and rural settlements in%, 2010 census

The Tundra Yukaghirs live in the Nizhnekolymsky District in the Sakha Republic; the Taiga Yukaghirs in the Sakha Republic and in Srednekansky District of Magadan Oblast. By the time of Russian colonization in the 17th century, the Yukaghir tribal groups occupied territories from the Lena River to the mouth of the Anadyr River. The number of the Yukaghirs decreased between the 17th and 19th centuries due to epidemics, internecine wars and Tsarist colonial policy which may have included genocide against the sedentary hunter-fisher Anaouls. Some of the Yukaghirs have assimilated with the Yakuts, Evens, and Russians.

Currently, Yukaghirs live in the Sakha Republic and the Chukotka Autonomous Okrug of the Russian Federation. According to the 2002 Census, their total number was 1,509 people, up from 1,112 recorded in the 1989 Census.

According to the 2001 all-Ukrainian census, 12 Yukaghirs are living in Ukraine. Only two of them indicated Yukaghir as their native language. For the remaining six it is Russian and for one it is another language.

Yukaghirs (including Chuvans) by selected settlements:

Name	Total population	Yukaghir population	Percentage of Yukaghir population
Nalemnoye	230	130	56.52%
Andryushkino	741	197	26.59%
Chersky	2,641	50	1.90%
Markovo	922	255	27.66%
Anadyr	13,043	211	1.62%
Chuvanskoye	226	134	59.29%
Snezhnoye	313	111	35.46%

== Genetics ==
Genetically, Yukaghirs exhibit roughly equal frequencies of the Y-DNA haplogroups N1c, Q1, and C2 (formerly C3).

According to another study, out of 11 Yukaghir males 3 turned out to belong to the Y-haplogroup N1c (different subclade from the one found in Yakuts), another 4 - to the Y-haplogroup C2 (former C3; for the most part, the same subclade that's also found in Koryaks), one more - to the Y-haplogroup O, and the rest 3 exhibit apparent Russian genetic influence (two individuals belonging to the Y-haplogroup R1a, and one more - to the Y-haplogroup I2a). The study also found no similarities between Yukaghirs and Chukchis in regards to mitochondrial DNA.

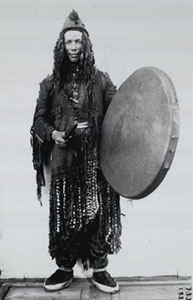
Yukaghir shaman, 1902

== Culture ==
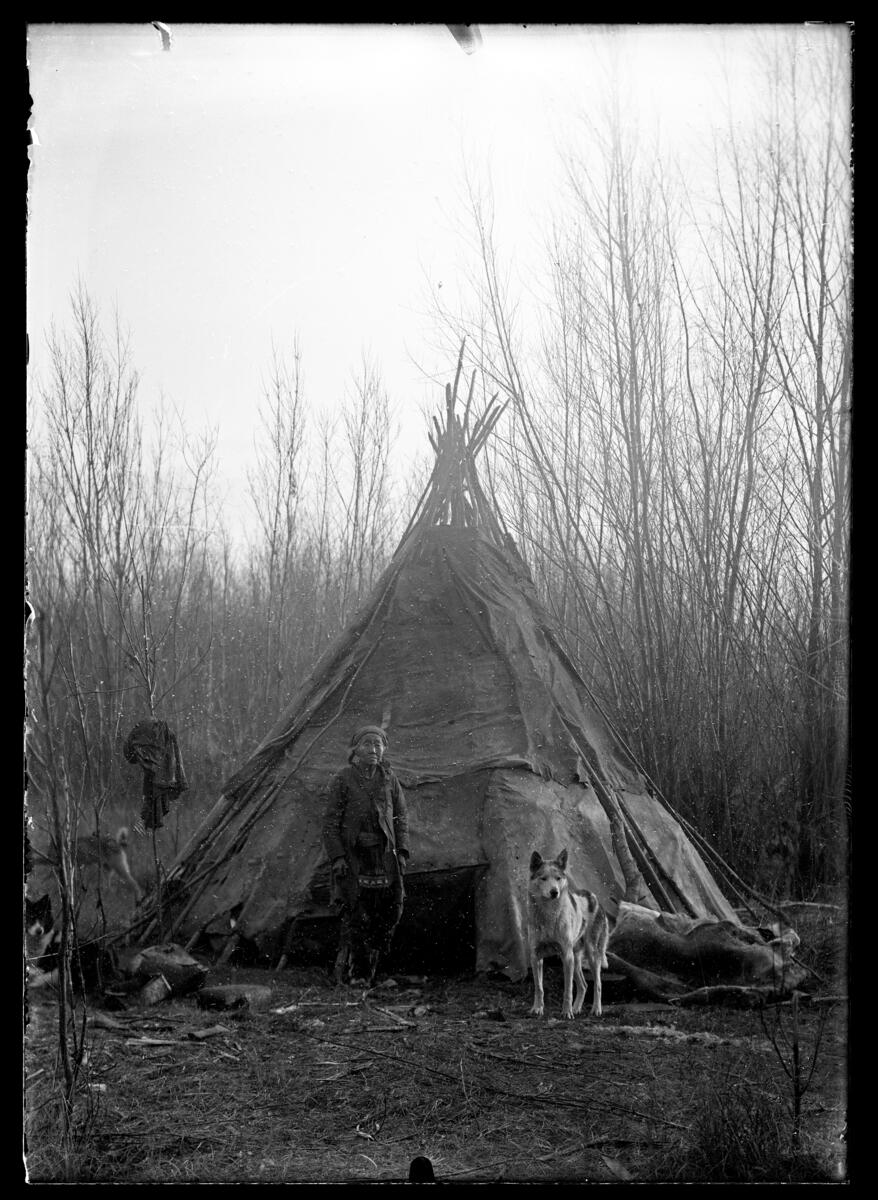
Photo of Yukaghir man with his laika taken by Vladimir Jochelson during the Jesup North Pacific Expedition in 1901

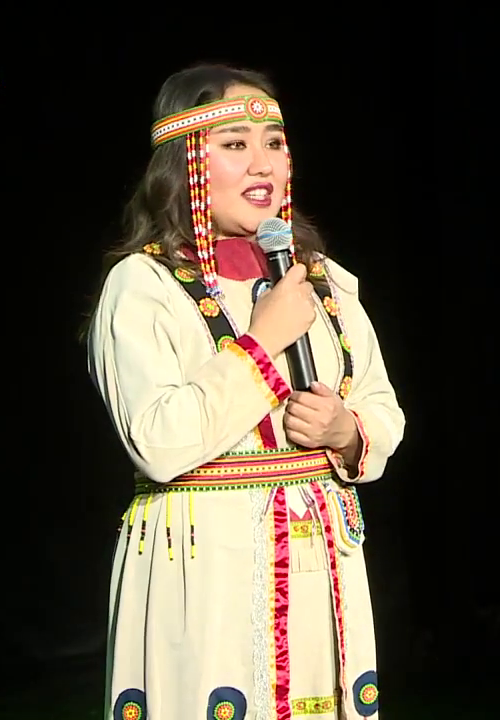
Modern Yukaghir singer Irina Duskulova

The main traditional activity is nomadic and semi-nomadic hunting of deer, moose, wild sheep, and sable, as well as fishing. Reindeer are bred mostly for transportation. Horses are known among the Yukaghir as "domestic reindeer of Yakuts" (Yoqod ile in Tundra Yukaghir or Yaqad āçə in Kolyma Yukaghir). A Yukaghir house is called a chum.

=== Language ===
The Yukaghir languages are a small language family of two closely related languages, Tundra Yukaghir and Kolyma Yukaghir, although there used to be more. They are unclassified languages: their origin and relation to other languages are unknown; some scholars consider them distantly related to the Uralic languages, but this classification is not accepted by the majority of specialists in Uralic linguistics. The languages are regarded as moribund, since less than 370 people can speak either Yukaghir language. Most Yukaghirs today speak Yakut and Russian.

=== Religion ===
Alongside Russian Orthodox beliefs, Yukaghirs practice shamanism. The dominant cults are ancestral spirits, the spirits of Fire, Sun (Pugu), Hunting, Earth, and Water, which can act as protectors or as enemies of people. The most important is the cult of Pugu, the Sun, who is the highest judge in all disputes. The spirits of the dead go to a place called Aibidzi. Every clan had a shaman called an alma. After death every alma was treated as a deity, and the body of the dead alma was dismembered and kept by the clan as relics. The Yukaghir still continue traditions stemming from their origins as nomadic reindeer-hunters: they practice dog sacrifice and have an epic poem based around crows. The animal cult was especially strong in the elk cult. There was a number of rituals and taboos connected with elk and deer hunting.

== See also ==
- Paleosiberian languages
- Uralic–Yukaghir languages
- Yukaghir birch-bark carvings
