= Tundra Yukaghir language =

Yukaghir language of northeastern Russia

Tundra Yukaghir
- Northern Yukaghir
- Вадул аруу Wadul aruu
- Native to: Russia
- Region: Sakha
- Ethnicity: 1,800 all Yukaghir (2020 census)
- Native speakers: (75 cited 1993)
- Language family: Yukaghir: Tundra Yukaghir
- Writing system: Cyrillic

Language codes
- ISO 639-3: ykg
- Glottolog: nort2745
- ELP: Tundra Yukagir
- Pre-contact distribution of Tundra Yukaghir (green) and other Yukaghir languages

- Tundra Yukaghir is classified as Critically Endangered by the UNESCO Atlas of the World's Languages in Danger.

The Tundra Yukaghir language (also known as Northern Yukaghir; self-designation: Вадул аруу (Wadul aruu)) is one of only two extant Yukaghir languages. Last spoken in the tundra belt extending between the lower Indigirka to the lower Kolyma basin (69°N 154°E), Tundra Yukaghir was formerly spoken in a much wider area extending west to the Lena basin.

== Classification ==
The relationship of the Yukaghir languages with other language families is uncertain, though it has been suggested that they are distantly related to the Uralic languages, thus forming the putative Uralic–Yukaghir language family.

Tundra and Kolyma Yukaghir are the only two remnants of what used to be one of the dominant languages/language families of northeastern Siberia, spreading from the River Anadyr in the east to the River Lena in the west. On the basis of the evidence of early sources, it can be assumed that there existed a Yukaghir dialect continuum, with what is today Tundra Yukaghir and Kolyma Yukaghir at the extremes. Tundra Yukaghir and Kolyma Yukaghir are not mutually intelligible today.

== Phonology ==
=== Vowels ===
	Front				Central		Back	
	unrounded		rounded		Central		Back	
	short	long	short	long	short	long	short	long
Close	i	iː					u	uː
Mid	e	eː	ø	øː			o	oː
Open					a	aː		

The long mid vowels /eː øː oː/ are realized as diphthongs when stressed: they are [ie uø uo], respectively.

=== Consonants ===
		Bilabial	Alveolar	Palatal	Velar	Uvular
Nasal		m	n	nʲ	ŋ	
Plosive	voiceless	p	t	tʲ	k	q
Plosive	voiced	b	d	dʲ	ɡ	ʁ ~ ɢ
Fricative			s			ʁ ~ ɢ
Approximant	median			j	w	
Approximant	lateral		l	lʲ		
Trill			r			

- /ʁ/ is realized as a plosive [ɢ] after /ŋ/.

=== Phonotactics ===
Syllable structure is CVC, i.e. up to one consonant can occur at the beginning or end of a word and up to two in the middle.

== Orthography ==
In the first Yukagir primer for the Tundra Yukaghir language, an orthography close to that of Yakut was used:

А а	Б б	В в	Г г	Ҕ ҕ	Д д	Дь дь	Е е	Ё ё	Ж ж
З з	И и	Й й	К к	Л л	Ль ль	М м	Н н	Нь нь	Ҥ ҥ
О о	Ө ө	П п	Р р	С с	Т т	У у	Ф ф	Х х	Ц ц
Ч ч	Ш ш	Щ щ	Ъ ъ	Ы ы	Ь ь	Э э	Ю ю	Я я

Some editions also use the letter Ԝ ԝ in replacement of В в. The books published in St. Petersburg use an alphabet similar to the "Yakut" version, but instead of the letters Ҕ ҕ and Ҥ ҥ, Ӷ ӷ and Ӈ ӈ are used, respectively.

== Grammar ==
Both Yukaghir languages have residual vowel harmony and a complex phonotactics of consonants, rich agglutinative morphology and are strictly head-final. They have practically no finite subordination and very few coordinate structures. Yukaghir has a split intransitive alignment system based on discourse-pragmatic features. In absence of narrow focus, the system is organised on a nominative–accusative basis; when focused, direct objects and subjects of intransitive verbs are co-aligned (special focus case, special focus agreement).

Tundra Yukaghir is largely head-final and dependent-marking: the default position for the verb is at the end of the clause, nouns are marked for case, adjectives precede nouns and relative clauses precede main clauses.

Case assignment for core participants behaves in a broadly split-intransitive manner, though actual assignment is very complex, involving semantic role, focus, relative animacy of the participants (first or second person versus third), and nature of the noun itself. The assigned cases are primary (used for focused or high animacy nominative arguments), neutral (for low animacy nominative arguments and high animacy accusative ones), and focus case (most focused accusative arguments). Indexation of arguments on the verb is similarly conditioned by focus and animacy as well as mood.

Oblique cases include dative, instrumental, comitative, locative, ablative, prolative, and transformative, the latter indicating the intended use or function of an argument.

There is limited incorporation, used in reflexive constructions.

Tundra Yukaghir verbs are marked for switch reference. Besides indicating whether the verb of a following clause shares the same subject, the switch-reference markers also describe the temporal relationship between clauses, the connection between the actions involved, and in the case of different subjects, the person (first or second versus third) and number of the subject.

== Bibliography ==
- Maslova, Elena (2003). Tundra Yukaghir. Munich: LINCOM GmbH. ISBN 3-89586-792-6.
