= Verkhnekolymsky District =

Verkhnekolymsky District Верхнеколымский улус (Russian)
- District

Other transcription(s)
  - Sakha: Үөһээ Халыма улууhа
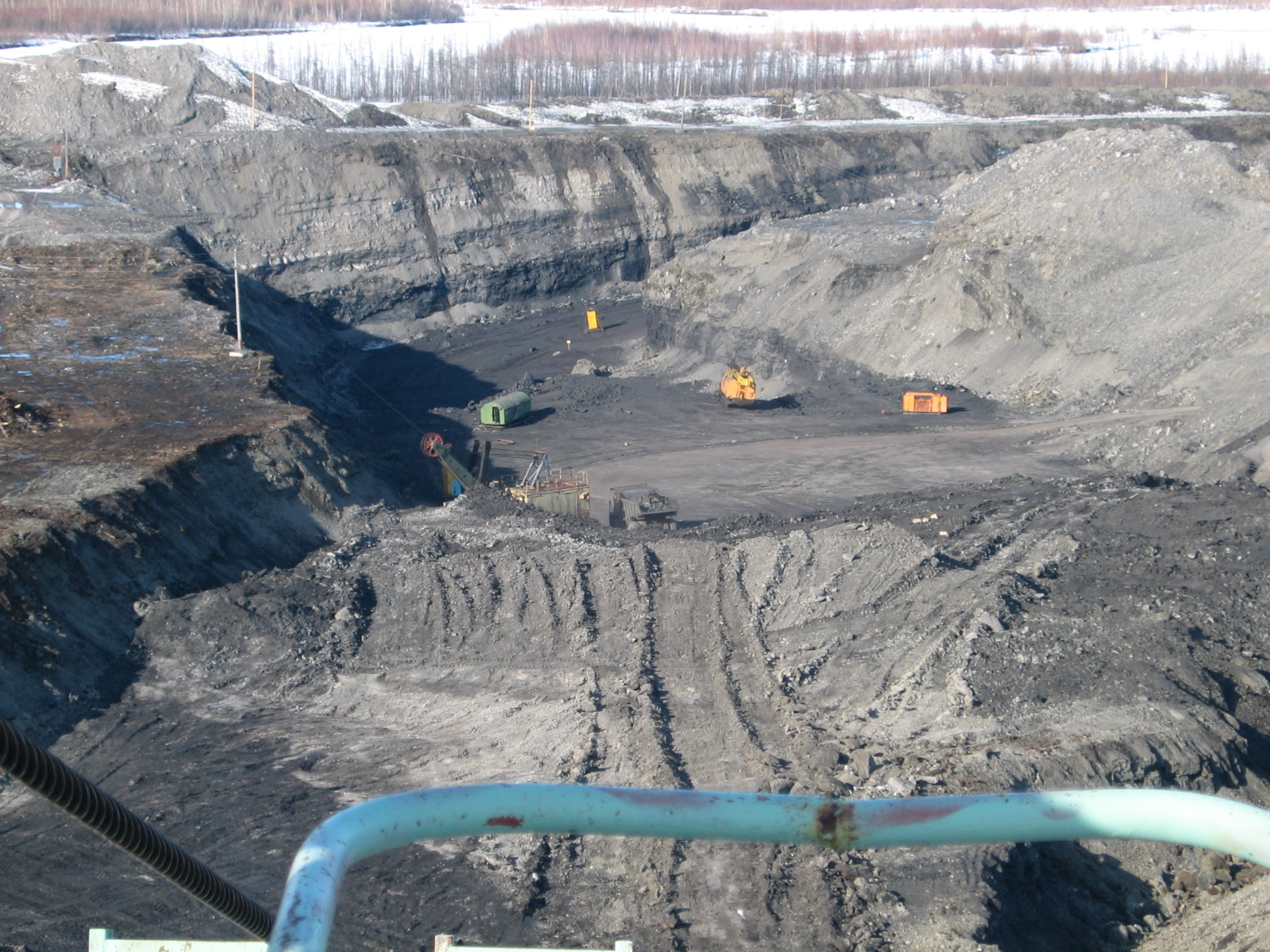
- Zyriansky Coal Mine, Verkhnekolymsky District

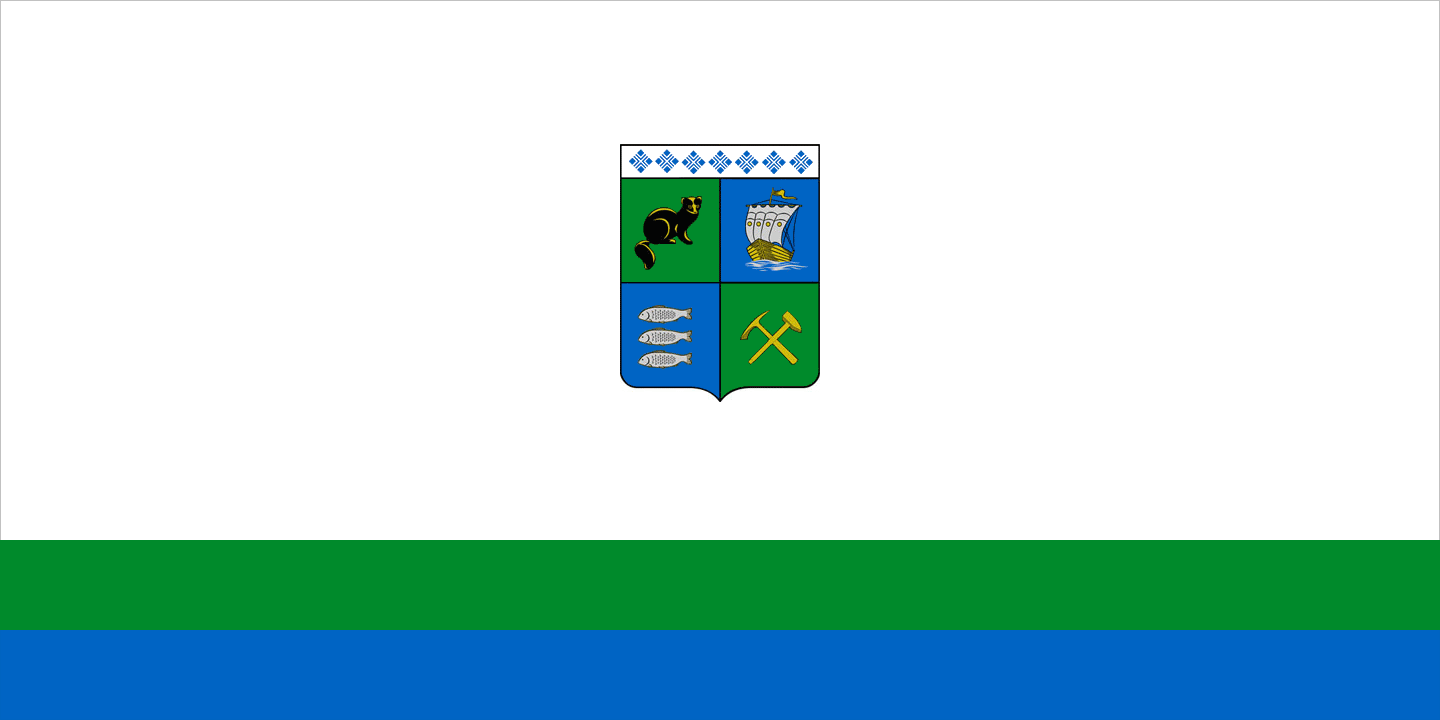
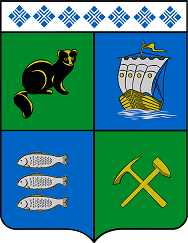
- Flag Coat of arms
- Location of Verkhnekolymsky District in the Sakha Republic
- Coordinates: 65°44′N 150°54′E
- Country: Russia
- Federal subject: Sakha Republic
- Established: April 30, 1954
- Administrative center: Zyryanka

Area
  - Total: 67,800 km^{2} (26,200 sq mi)

Population (2010 Census)
  - Total: 4,723
  - Density: 0.0697/km^{2} (0.180/sq mi)
  - Urban: 67.1%
  - Rural: 32.9%

Administrative structure
  - Administrative divisions: 1 Settlements, 5 Rural okrugs
  - Inhabited localities: 1 urban-type settlements, 5 rural localities

Municipal structure
  - Municipally incorporated as: Verkhnekolymsky Municipal District
  - Municipal divisions: 1 urban settlements, 5 rural settlements
- Time zone: UTC+
- OKTMO ID: 98615000
- Website: http://v-kol.ru/

Verkhnekolymsky District (Russian: Верхнеколы́мский улу́с; Yakut: Үөһээ Халыма улууһа, romanized: Üöhee Xalıma uluuha, Yakut pronunciation: [ˈyøheː xalɯma uluːha]) is an administrative and municipal district (raion, or ulus), one of the thirty-four in the Sakha Republic, Russia. It is located in the northeast of the republic and borders with Srednekolymsky District in the north and northeast, Srednekansky District and Susumansky District of Magadan Oblast in the east and south, Momsky District in the west, and with Abyysky District in the northwest. The area of the district is 67,800 square kilometers (26,200 sq mi). Its administrative center is the urban locality (a settlement) of Zyryanka. Population: 4,723 (2010 census); 5,653 (2002 Census); 10,072 (1989 Soviet census). The population of Zyryanka accounts for 67.1% of the district's total population.

== Geography ==
The main rivers of the district are the Kolyma River and its tributaries. Most of the territory of the district is part of the Kolyma lowland. The Yukaghir Plateau, reaching a maximum height of 1,128 m (3,701 ft) at Mount Chubukulakh, rises in the east and some eastern foothills of the Chersky Range to the west, such as the Arga-Tas in the southwest and the Osalin Range in the northwest.

=== Climate ===
Average January temperature is −38 °C (−36 °F) and average July temperature ranges from +12 °C (54 °F) to +14 °C (57 °F). Annual precipitation ranges from 250 to 400 millimeters (9.8 to 15.7 in).

== History ==
The district was established on April 30, 1954.

== Demographics ==
As of the 2021 Census, the ethnic composition was as follows:

- Russians: 45.6%
- Yakuts: 29.1%
- Evens: 8.7%
- Yukaghirs: 8.3%
- Ukrainians: 2.1%
- Tajiks: 1.4%
- other ethnicities: 4.8%

== Inhabited localities ==
Municipal composition
Towns	Population	Male	Female	Inhabited localities in jurisdiction
Zyryanka (Зырянка)	3528	1668 (47.3%)	1860 (52.7%)	Urban-type settlement of Zyryanka (administrative center of the district)
Rural settlements	Population	Male	Female	Rural localities in jurisdiction*
Arylakhsky Nasleg (Арылахский наслег)	499	254 (50.9%)	245 (49.1%)	**selo of Usun-Kyuyol**
Verkhnekolymsky Nasleg (Верхнеколымский наслег)	365	166 (45.5%)	199 (54.5%)	**selo of Verkhnekolymsk**
Nelemninsky National Nasleg (Нелемнинский национальный наслег)	262	145 (55.3%)	117 (44.7%)	**selo of Nelemnoye**
Ugolninsky Nasleg (Угольнинский наслег)	329	176 (53.5%)	153 (46.5%)	**selo of Ugolnoye**
Utainsky Nasleg (Утаинский наслег)	98	57 (58.2%)	41 (41.8%)	**selo of Utaya**

Divisional source:
Population source:
*Administrative centers are shown in bold
