= Zyryanka =

Urban-type settlement in Russia

Zyryanka Зырянка
- Urban-type settlement

Other transcription(s)
  - Yakut: Зырянка
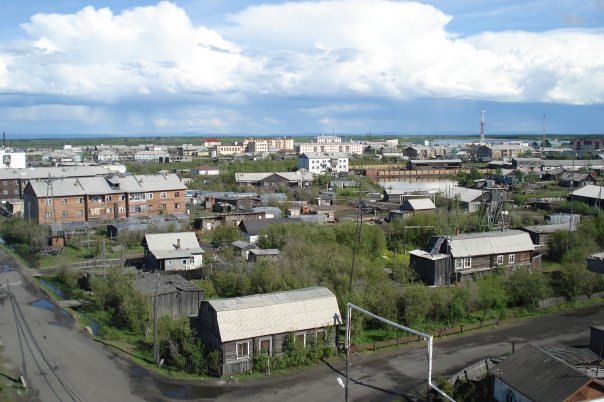
- Aerial view of Zyryanka

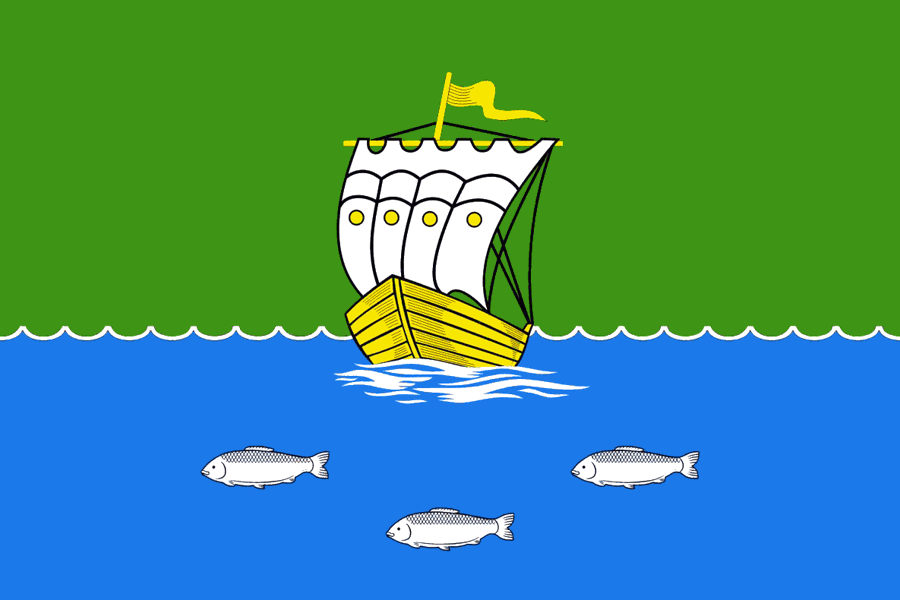
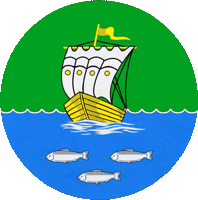
- Flag Coat of arms
- Interactive map of Zyryanka
- Location of Zyryanka Zyryanka (Sakha Republic)
- Coordinates: 65°45′N 150°54′E
- Country: Russia
- Federal subject: Sakha Republic
- Administrative district: Verkhnekolymsky District
- SettlementSelsoviet: Settlement of Zyryanka
- Founded: 1937
- Urban-type settlement status since: 1940

Population (2010 Census)
  - Total: 3,170
  - Estimate (2023): 2,455 (−22.6%)

Administrative status
  - Capital of: Verkhnekolymsky District, Settlement of Zyryanka

Municipal status
  - Municipal district: Verkhnekolymsky Municipal District
  - Urban settlement: Zyryanka Urban Settlement
  - Capital of: Verkhnekolymsky Municipal District, Zyryanka Urban Settlement
- Time zone: UTC+
- Postal codes: 678769, 678770
- OKTMO ID: 98615151051

Zyryanka population
- 2010 Census: 3,170
- 2002 Census: 3,749
- 1989 Census: 6,687
- 1979 Census: 5,749

Zyryanka (Russian: Зыря́нка; Yakut: Зырянка, Zıryanka) is an urban locality (an urban-type settlement) and the administrative center of Verkhnekolymsky District in the Sakha Republic, Russia, on the left bank of the Kolyma River. As of the 2010 Census, its population was 3,170.

== History ==
It was founded in 1937 in connection with the development of coal deposits and was granted urban-type settlement status in 1940.

== Administrative and municipal status ==
Within the framework of administrative divisions, the urban-type settlement of Zyryanka serves as the administrative center of Verkhnekolymsky District. As an administrative division, it is incorporated within Verkhnekolymsky District as the Settlement of Zyryanka. As a municipal division, the Settlement of Zyryanka is incorporated within Verkhnekolymsky Municipal District as Zyryanka Urban Settlement.

== Economy ==
Coal mining is central to the economy of the region. Zyryanka is home to OAO Kolyma Shipping Company, which is engaged in coal transportation and importation of industrial goods and foodstuffs.

=== Transportation ===
Zyryanka is served by the Zyryanka Airport (main) and the Zyryanka West Airport (secondary).

== Climate ==
Zyryanka has a subarctic climate (Köppen Dfc), with extremely cold winters and mild summers. Precipitation is highest in the summer and lowest in late winter or spring.

Climate data for Zyryanka
| Month | Jan | Feb | Mar | Apr | May | Jun | Jul | Aug | Sep | Oct | Nov | Dec | Year |
|---|---|---|---|---|---|---|---|---|---|---|---|---|---|
| Record high °C (°F) | −8.2 (17.2) | −4.9 (23.2) | 4.0 (39.2) | 13.7 (56.7) | 27.5 (81.5) | 33.8 (92.8) | 36.8 (98.2) | 33.0 (91.4) | 26.5 (79.7) | 15.0 (59.0) | 0.4 (32.7) | −4.7 (23.5) | 36.8 (98.2) |
| Mean daily maximum °C (°F) | −32.8 (−27.0) | −28.8 (−19.8) | −17.2 (1.0) | −4.0 (24.8) | 9.5 (49.1) | 19.9 (67.8) | 22.0 (71.6) | 17.4 (63.3) | 8.8 (47.8) | −6.2 (20.8) | −21.9 (−7.4) | −31.3 (−24.3) | −5.4 (22.3) |
| Daily mean °C (°F) | −36.1 (−33.0) | −33.2 (−27.8) | −23.5 (−10.3) | −10.3 (13.5) | 4.2 (39.6) | 13.9 (57.0) | 16.3 (61.3) | 12.2 (54.0) | 4.6 (40.3) | −9.4 (15.1) | −24.9 (−12.8) | −34.2 (−29.6) | −10.0 (13.9) |
| Mean daily minimum °C (°F) | −39.4 (−38.9) | −37.4 (−35.3) | −29.8 (−21.6) | −17.4 (0.7) | −0.9 (30.4) | 8.7 (47.7) | 11.4 (52.5) | 7.8 (46.0) | 1.2 (34.2) | −12.6 (9.3) | −28.2 (−18.8) | −37.4 (−35.3) | −14.5 (5.9) |
| Record low °C (°F) | −55.6 (−68.1) | −54.8 (−66.6) | −51.9 (−61.4) | −40.6 (−41.1) | −26.4 (−15.5) | −7.2 (19.0) | −0.2 (31.6) | −4.3 (24.3) | −12.3 (9.9) | −34.8 (−30.6) | −50.2 (−58.4) | −54.4 (−65.9) | −55.6 (−68.1) |
| Average precipitation mm (inches) | 14 (0.6) | 14 (0.6) | 12 (0.5) | 10 (0.4) | 17 (0.7) | 37 (1.5) | 53 (2.1) | 51 (2.0) | 39 (1.5) | 27 (1.1) | 27 (1.1) | 18 (0.7) | 319 (12.6) |
| Average precipitation days (≥ 0.1 mm) | 16.6 | 16.4 | 16.6 | 9.1 | 8.5 | 11.4 | 11.5 | 13.1 | 13.7 | 18.7 | 18.2 | 18.7 | 172.5 |
| Average relative humidity (%) | 81.1 | 81.0 | 76.9 | 72.1 | 66.2 | 67.7 | 71.7 | 79.3 | 80.5 | 85.3 | 85.4 | 82.4 | 77.5 |
| Mean monthly sunshine hours | 6.2 | 70.0 | 189.1 | 315.0 | 300.7 | 312.0 | 322.4 | 207.7 | 138.0 | 71.3 | 33.0 | 0.0 | 1,965.4 |
Source 1: climatebase.ru (1936-2012)
Source 2: NOAA (precipitation only, 1961–1990)
