= Birch bark letters from Siberia =

Messages from victims of Soviet deportations

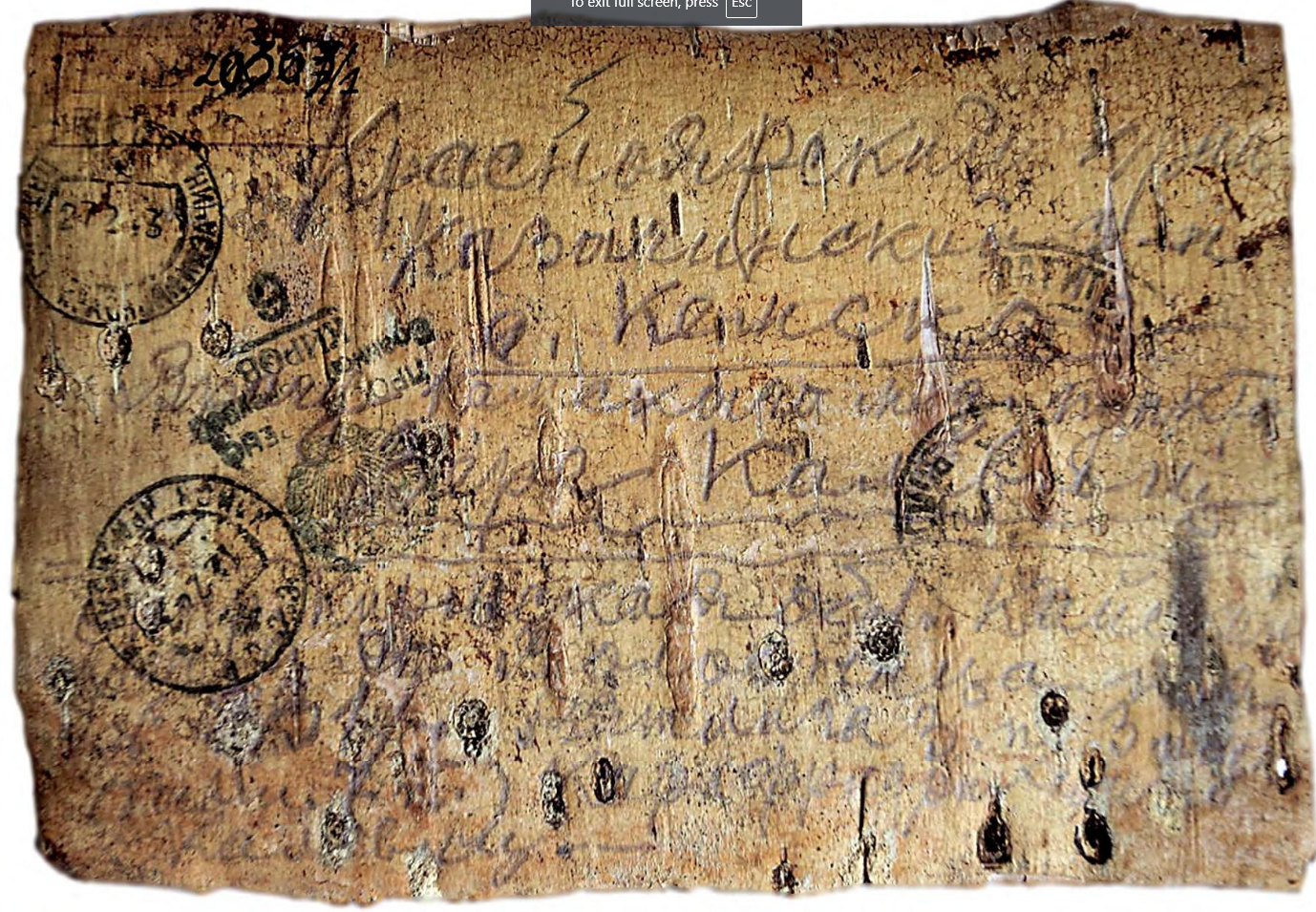
Birch bark letter from Siberia by Kārlis Roberts Kalevics (1877–1945)

Birch bark letters from Siberia were written by people deported to Soviet Gulag labor camps. Often they had only birch bark for writing letters, especially during the World War II when paper was scarce everywhere. In 2023 Estonia, Latvia, Lithuania, Poland and Ukraine, submitted a joint application to include birch bark letters from Siberia (1945–1965) in the UNESCO "Memory of the World" Register. The application presents 148 items, including letters and other documents on birch bark.

The preparations for this submission were started in 2015 by representatives of the three Baltic States.

== Estonia ==
In Estonia, they are kept in the Vabamu Museum of Occupations and Freedom and in the Estonian History Museum.

== Latvia ==
In 2009, the collection "Letters written in Siberia on birch bark" (Sibīrijā rakstītas vēstules uz bērza tāss) was included in the Latvian national register of the UNESCO Memory of the World Programme. It consists of 45 letters written in prisons and camps between 1941 and 1965.

They are kept in eleven museums in Latvia, including the Tukums Museum, Aizkraukle History and Art Museum, Daugava Museum, Museum of the Occupation of Latvia, Madona Local Lore and Art Museum (Madonas novadpētniecības un mākslas muzejs), Riga Museum of Literature and Music (Rakstniecības un mūzikas muzejs), Talsi County Museum, Latvian Museum of National History.

Agrita Ozola, head of the Tukums Museum, published the book Sibīrijā vēstules (Siberian Letters).

== Lithuania ==
On May 21, 2015, together with other objects, birch bark letters kept in the Museum of Occupations and Freedom Fights were entered into the Lithuania's national register of the Memory of the World. Other places in Lithuania that preserve birch bark letters are the Martynas Mažvydas National Library of Lithuania, the Directorate of the State Kernavė Cultural Reserve, the Biržai Region Museum "Sėla", a branch of the Gargždai Region Museum, the Special Archives of Lithuania, the Panevėžys Local Lore Museum, Salomėja Nėris Memorial Museum, branch of the Maironis Lithuanian Literature Museum, Šiauliai "Aušra" Museum, Wroblewski Library of the Lithuanian Academy of Sciences, and Kaunas Ninth Fort Museum.

== Poland ==
In Poland, they are preserved in Museum of Rev. Józef Jarzębowski in Licheń Stary and in the Museum of the Second World War in Gdańsk. In 2023, the Institute of National Remembrance received a diary made of birch bark written in Siberian exile. In 2023, Archiwum Kresowe in Zielona Góra received photographs of a similar diary from a private archive.

== Ukraine ==
In Ukraine, they are preserved in the National Museum of the History of Ukraine in the Second World War, the Museum of Totalitarian Regimes "Territory of Terror" and the Ternopil Regional Museum of Local Lore, Ternopil.

== Library of Congress ==
In the U.S. Library of Congress, the letters are kept in the collection "Siberian Letters on Birch Bark".

== See also ==
- Birch bark manuscript
- Memory of the World Register – Europe and North America
- Population transfer in the Soviet Union
