= Pulp and paper industry in India =

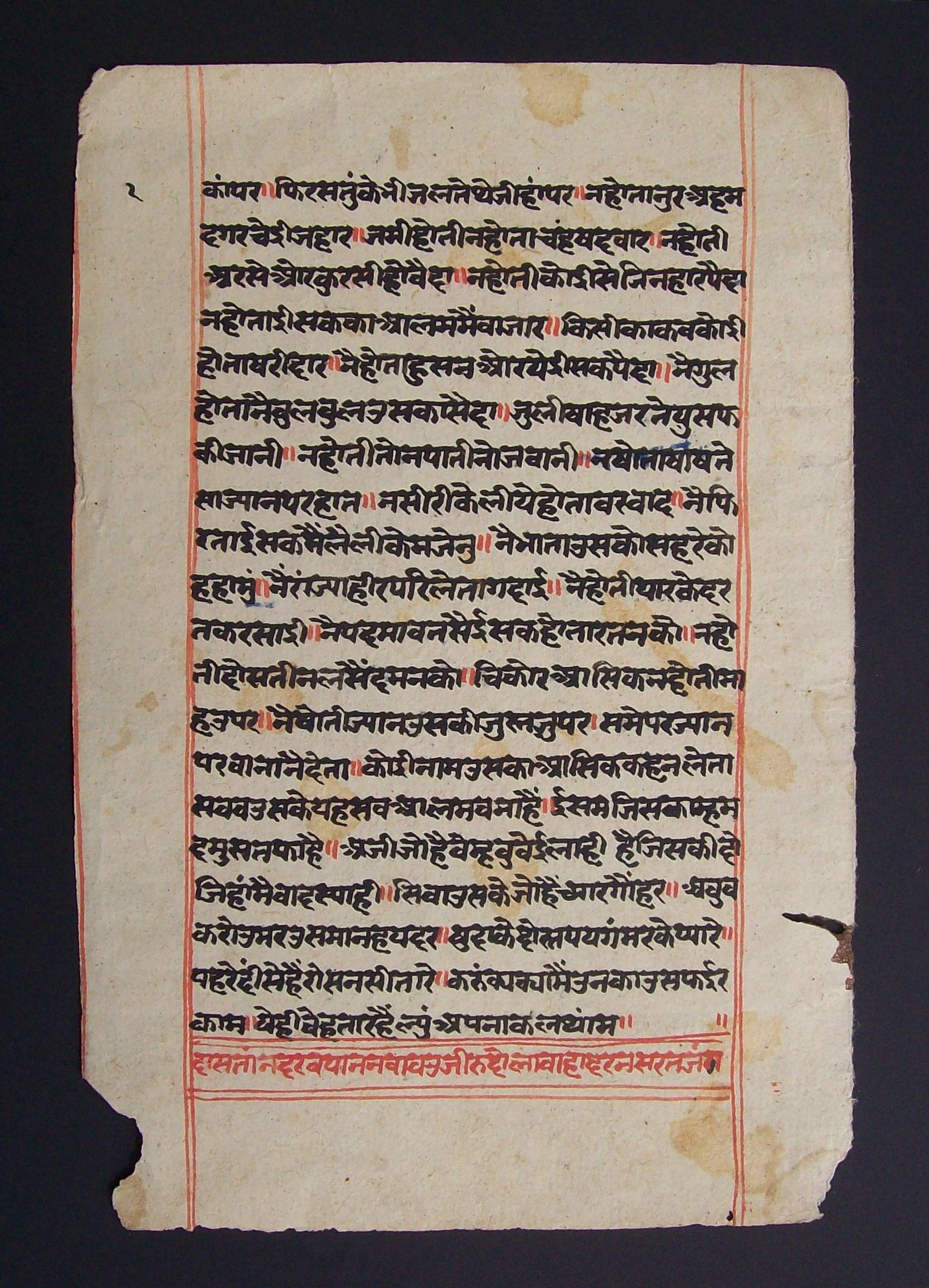
Ancient Sanskrit on hemp based paper. Hemp fiber was commonly used in the production of paper from 200 BCE to the late 1800s.

The pulp and paper industry in India is the 5th largest industrial sector in India. India accounts for approximately 5% of global paper production and ranks 15th globally in terms of total output. The industry provides 0.5 million direct and 1.5 million indirect employment. Its estimated turnover was ₹80,000 crore in 2024. There are 900 paper mills in India, with most of them being located in Gujarat, Maharashtra and Uttar Pradesh.

It produces a wide range of products including writing and printing paper, newsprint, packaging board and specialty paper. The sector plays a key role in supporting education, information circulation and packaging. Production capacity is around 25–26 million tonnes annually, with installed capacity at about 30-32 million tonnes. Per capita paper consumption is relatively low: about 15–17 kg per year.

== History ==
Long before paper was invented, ancient Hindus in India used two types of writing materials - hard materials like stone, metals, conch-shell, earthenware, terracotta and soft materials like wooden board, birch bark, palm leaf manuscripts and well beaten cotton clothes. Many Hindu religious texts have been written on palm leaf pamphlets.

The traditional paper manufacturing in India dates back to the 14th century. It produced handmade indigenous paper of high quality. But over time, with increasing demand, handmade paper became too expensive for mass printing applications.

The printing industry in India dramatically expanded after the 1860s but was heavily dependent on imported paper. Most of the printing presses in India were importing paper from Europe and the indigenous paper manufacturing industry was rapidly declining. Workshops to produce papers in the English style were set up in the 1850s but were closed down due to high costs and low quality outputs. By the 1860s, the manufacturing was revived with outlets at Girgaum, Mahim and Mumbai.

Calcutta was the printing capital of India since the 1790s. In 1830s, mechanised paper was first manufactured at Serampore near Calcutta. It was started by the Christian Missionaries and had just one machine. Known as the "Serampore Paper", the mill produced white paper of middling quality. It was renamed as Bally Paper Mills in 1870 and got closed down by the end of the century due to the lack of investment and upgradation.

The Titagarh Paper Mills was the first large scale paper manufacturing plant built in India. It was built at a cost of ₹7 lakh and had about 700 employees working within 6 years of its inauguration. Located in Titagarh, on the banks of Hooghly river, it was set up by "Reinhold & Co." in 1882 but started its operations only after it was acquired by FW "Heighlers & Co." in 1884. After few initial obstacles, the mill started producing good quality paper at rates much lower than imported low quality papers.

By 1910, Titagarh Paper Mills overtook Imperial Paper Mills and Bally Paper Mills to become the largest paper factory in India. The paper manufacturing industry slowly developed all across India and more mills developed after the Bamboo Paper Industry (Protection) Act (1925) and Indian Finance (Supplementary and Extending) Act (1931) were introduced. Major mills in other places included the "Girgaum Paper Mills" (Bombay), "Scindia Paper Mills" (Gwalior), "Reay Paper Mills" (Pune), "Bengal Paper Mills" (Ranigunj), and the "Upper India Paper Mills" (Lucknow). The Upper India Couper Paper Mills Company Ltd, was registered as a joint stock company in 1878 and started production in 1882. It was the first mill that was managed by Indians.

== Manufacturing ==
A. Rehman has described the process of traditional papermaking in India. The process to make rough paper was - "Waste paper was torn to pieces, sorted according to colour, moistened with water, taken to the river and pounded with stones, and washed for three days. It was then taken to a cistern about 7ft x 4ftx 4ft deep, half - filled with water. The pulp was thrown into this cistern. When it was thoroughly dissolved, the workman took in both hands the square frame which held the screen serving as a sieve, passed it underwater and drew it slowly and evenly to the surface; such that, as the water passed through, a uniform film of pulp was left on the screen. The screen was then lifted up and turned over, and the film of paper was spread on a rag cushion. When sufficient layers had been heaped on this cushion, about 9-14 inches high, a rag was spread over them and a plank weighted with heavy stones was laid over it. When this pressure had drained the water and some of the moisture out of the stock of paper, two men, see-sawed over the bundle of paper by hand. When it was well pressed the paper was peeled off, layer after layer, and spread to dry either on the walls of the building or on rags laid in the sun. When dried, each sheet was laid on the polished wooden board and rubbed with a shell till it shone."

Rahman also described the process of ancient glazed papermaking in India - "The material was cut into small pieces, moistened with water and pounded by a heavy fixed hammer, the dhegi. Then washed with clean water and moistened with slaked lime and left in a heap on the floor for seven or eight days, then pounded again, heaped and left to lie for four days more. Again washed this material (rag) with plane [sic] water and washed material mixed with khar (impure carbonate of soda, 1 khar:38 pulp)) overnight. This rag was again washed and again mixed with khar (1 khar:40 pulp) and dried in the sun. And again kept in water overnight and again washed. Washed rags were mixed with country soap (1 soap:27 rags) and pounded and dried. Then this pulp was washed again. Then placed into a cement-lined cistern, about 7ft x 4ft x 4ft deep. The rest of the process was similar to the above described technique."

Ray describes other processes of papermaking followed by early Hindus. He mentions in his book - "The old clothes, old tents, the bark of certain shrubs and trees were washed well and soaked in water for few days; these materials were beaten with wooden hammer (dhegi). The pulp was mixed with a little water in a lime-lined (cunam) reservoir, where the beating operation was also carried out. The workman dipped their moulds into the reservoir, and the mixture, when lifted out, would become paper. It was then removed, and each sheet drawn through a second reservoir of water and then hung up to dry in sun. A quantity of gum Arabic was dissolved in water and then the beaten pulp was placed. The water in the second reservoir, through which the sheets were drawn, also contained gum in the form of mucilage, as well as some alum dissolved in it. The moulds or forms used by the workmen were generally made of bamboo. The gum was obtained as an exudation from the babool tree."

Manekji Cursetji Thanewalla in his Gujarati travelogue "Maro Pravas", described the process of paper manufacturing at the "Titagarh Paper Mills". The following is an excerpt from his book - "Firstly, a very large circular vessel is filled with dirty rags, pieces of cloth, bits of hemp rope and other articles of a similar description. Steam is passed through this vessel at very high pressure to soften the material and reduce it to a pulpy state. The rags are softened in this vessel for nearly four hours. Once this process is completed, the pulp is removed from this large vessel and transferred to smaller containers which are open at the top and rotate slowly on a central pivot. Water and alum are added to these containers to clean and bleach the pulp rendering it as white as milk. As the container rotates continuously, the pulp gets uniformly mixed. From here, the mixture is transferred to a roller which squeezes out some of the water. It is then taken to a papermaking loom which is similar to a textile loom. The mixture is poured into this loom which converts it into a long stretch of paper, about 40 inches in width and 100 yards in length. The freshly made paper is rolled onto a spindle which also rotates slowly. Once the roll is full, it is transferred to another department where the paper is cut into the required sizes."

== Raw materials ==
There are around 900 paper mills in India, with 553 mills operating at a total operating capacity of around 25.6 million metric tons. Gujarat has the highest number of paper mills (150), followed by Maharashtra (100) and Uttar Pradesh (70).

The sector uses a mix of raw materials including:

- Wood and bamboo fibres
- Agro-residues such as bagasse and wheat straw
- Recycled fibre and wastepaper

In the early years, paper was mostly produced from rags. In 1924, more and more industries started using bamboo as the main raw material. The introduction of wood pulp towards the late 19th century revolutionized the industry. Wood pulp accounts for more than 21% of the raw material used in this industry. The wood is supplied mostly through agro forestry, which covers over 90% of industry needs, while the remainder comes from imports.

== Segments and products ==
The Indian paper industry is commonly segmented into:

- Writing and printing paper
- Newsprint
- Packaging paper and paperboard
- Specialty and tissue papers

Packaging paper and paperboard have increasingly their share in the production, owing to rapid growth in e-commerce, retail and fast-moving consumer goods sectors.

== Government initiatives ==
The "Central Pulp & Paper Research Institute" (CPPRI) was established in 1975. It was formed in light of the UNDP-GOI Project, which was undertaken with an objective to create necessary R&D facilities for evaluation of fibrous raw materials for the Indian paper industry. After the project was completed, the CPRI served as a "National Level Research Institute", dedicated for the assistance to the Indian paper industry.

The 11th Five Year Plan Schemes were mainly dedicated to the principle issues of the paper industry including:

- Conservation & Upgradation of Raw Material
- Quality Improvement
- Energy Management & Environment Management
- Human Resource & Skill Development

== Market dynamics ==
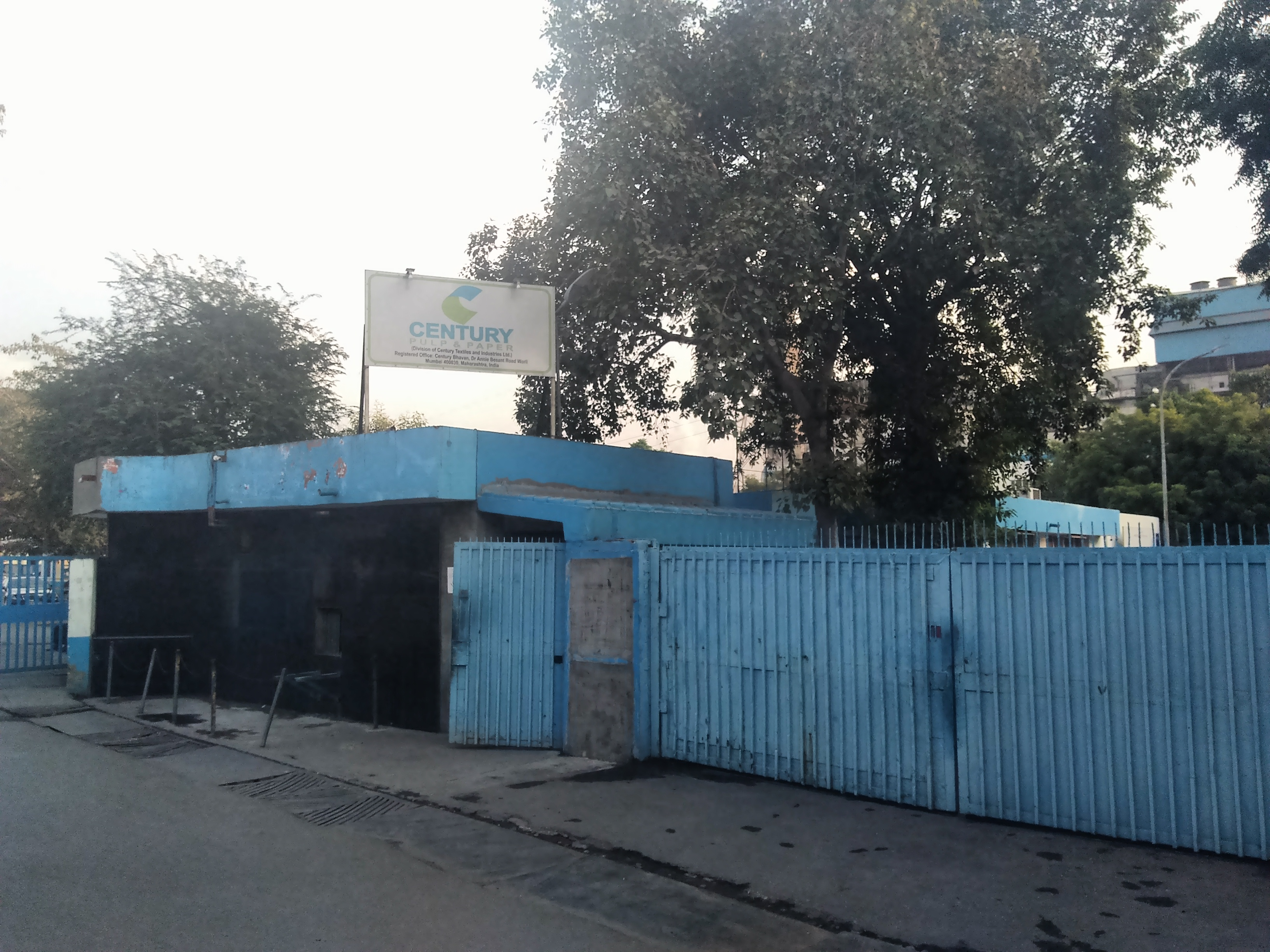
One of the major paper producers in India – Century Pulp and Papers in Nainital, part of the Aditya Birla Group

Although domestic production meets the major portion of internal demand, India also imports paper, paperboard and pulp, particularly specialty grades that are not produced locally. Imports have risen in recent years due to duty-free trade agreements that allow cheaper products from ASEAN (27% of paper imports) and other regions to enter the Indian market. The ASEAN paper imports doubled between 2023 and 2024 from 2.7 lakh tonnes to 5.1 lakh tonnes. The overall paper imports increased by 25% between 2022 and 2023. It surged by 34% between 2023 and 2024 from 14.3 lakh tonnes to 19.3 lakh tonnes.

In 2023, the overall pulp and paper market in India was valued at approximately US$14.75 billion and was projected to grow at a compound annual growth rate (CAGR) of about 13.4% through 2030. Despite positive long-term projections, the industry reported a slower volume growth of 2–5% in FA 2023–24, down from approximately 7% in the previous year.

== Challenges and sustainability ==
Challenges faced by the Indian paper and pulp sector include:

- Raw material supply constraints, especially for wood fibre
- Competition from imported paper
- Environmental concerns related to forestry and waste management
- Balancing cost competitiveness with sustainable practices

To address environmental and sustainability goals, many mills are increasing the use of recycled fibre. The Government has also undertaken various initiatives that aim to promote research, recycling technologies and eco-friendly material development.
