= Birch bark manuscript =

Documents written on the inner layer of birch bark

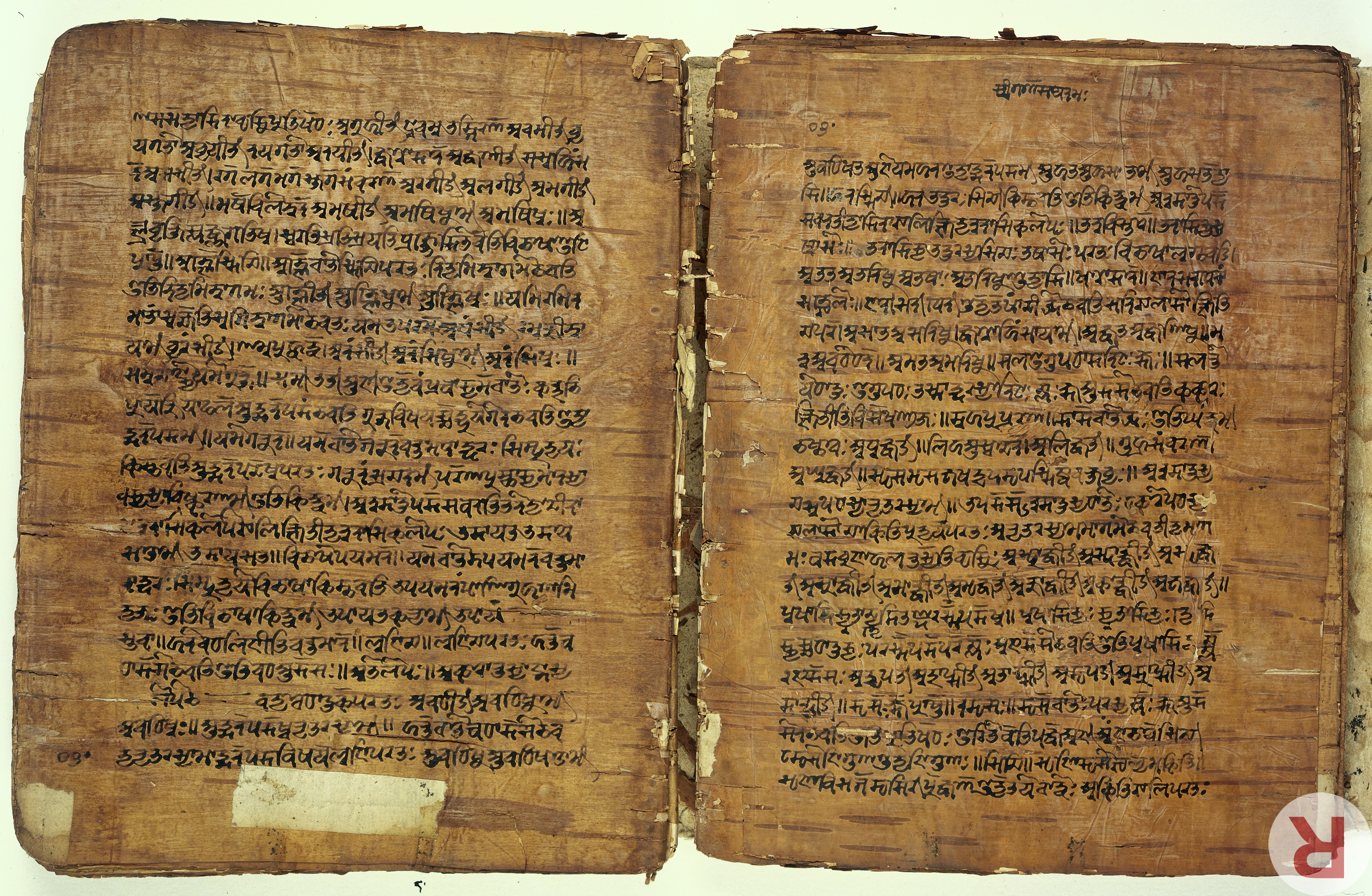
A birch bark manuscript from Kashmir of the Rupavatara, a grammatical textbook based on the Sanskrit grammar of Pāṇini (dated 1663)

A birch bark manuscript is a document written on the outer layer of birch bark, which was commonly used for writing before the mass production of paper. Evidence of birch bark for writing goes back many centuries and appears in various cultures, predominantly in and around the Indian subcontinent and East European Plain. The oldest such manuscripts are the numerous Gandhāran Buddhist texts from approximately the 1st century CE, from what is now Afghanistan. They contain among the earliest known versions of significant Buddhist scriptures, including a Dhammapada, discourses of Buddha that include the Rhinoceros Sutra, Avadanas and Abhidharma texts.

Sanskrit birch bark manuscripts written with Brahmi script have been dated to the first few centuries CE. Several early Sanskrit writers, such as Kālidāsa (c. 4th century CE), Sushruta (c. 3rd century CE), and Varāhamihira (6th century CE) mention its use for manuscripts. The bark of Betula utilis (Himalayan Birch) is still used today in India and Nepal for writing sacred mantras. Russian texts discovered in Veliky Novgorod have been dated to approximately the 11th to 15th centuries CE. Most of those documents are letters written by various people in a local dialect, Old Novgorodian. The Irish language's native writing system, Ogham, sometimes called the "tree alphabet", was traditionally attributed to the god Ogma who wrote a proscription on birch to Lugh, warning him; the text of this proscription can be found in the Book of Ballymote. The first letter of Ogham is beith; beithe means "birch".

== Gandhāran Buddhist manuscripts ==
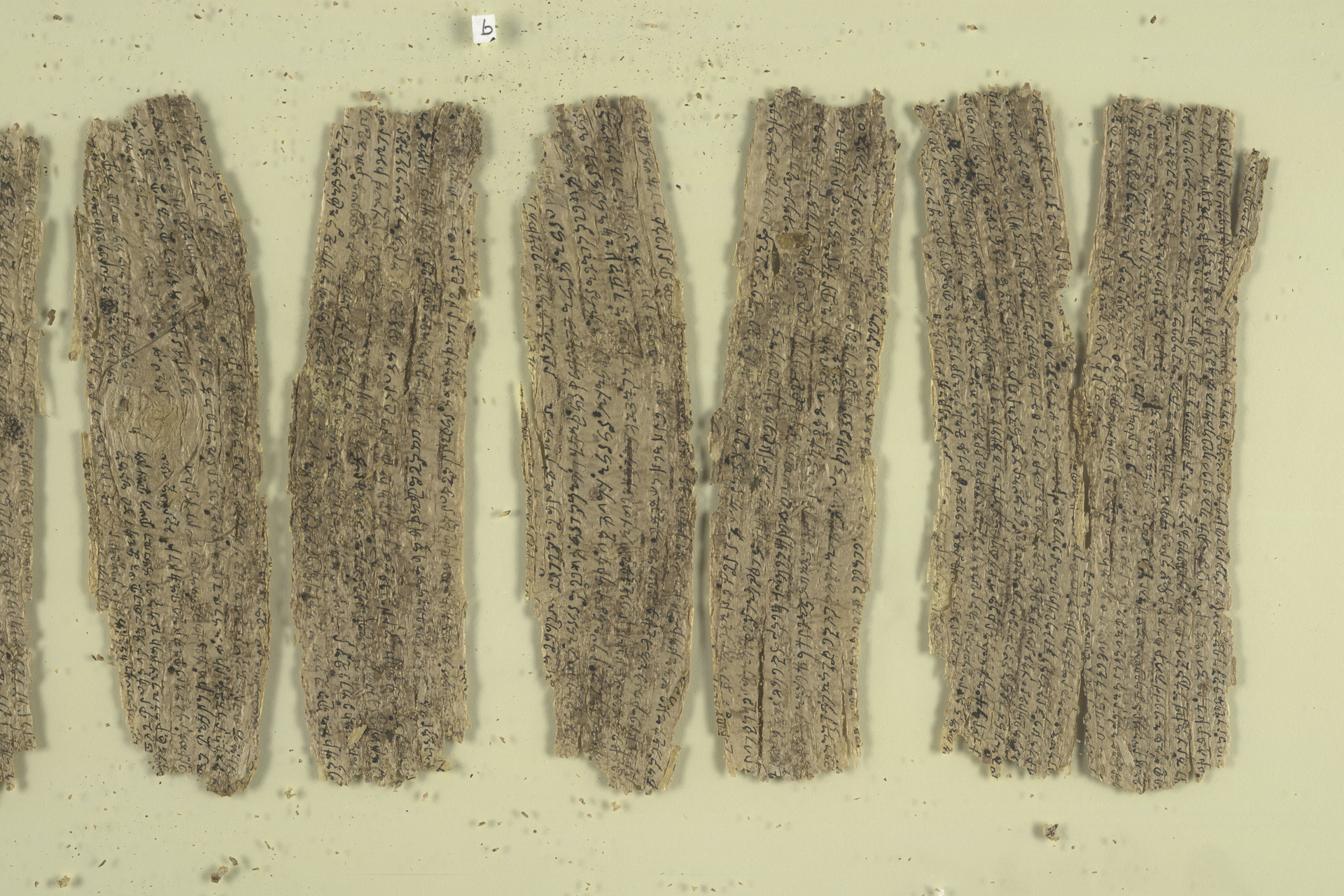
Gandhara birchbark scroll fragments (c. 1st century)

Buddhist manuscripts written in the Gāndhārī language are likely the oldest extant Indic texts, dating to approximately the 1st century CE. They were written on birch bark and stored in clay jars. The British Library acquired them in 1994. They were written in Kharoṣṭhī and were believed to have originated from Afghanistan, because similar birch bark manuscripts had been discovered in eastern Afghanistan. Since 1994, a similar collection of Gāndhārī texts from the same era, called the Senior collection, has also surfaced.

The British Library birch bark manuscripts were in the form of scrolls. They were very fragile and had already been damaged. They measured five to nine inches wide, and consisted of twelve- to eighteen-inch long, overlapping rolls that had been glued together to form longer scrolls. A thread sewn through the edges helped to hold them together. The script was written in black ink. The manuscripts were written on both sides of the scrolls, beginning at the top on one side, continuing with the scroll turned over and upside down, so that the text concluded at the top and back of the scroll. The longest intact scroll from the British Library collection is eighty-four inches long.

The texts were likely compiled by the Dharmaguptaka sect and probably "represent a random but reasonably representative fraction of what was probably a much larger set of texts preserved in the library of a monastery of the Dharmaguptaka sect in Nagarāhāra", according to Richard Salomon. The collection includes a variety of known commentaries and sutras, including a Dhammapada, discourses of Shakyamuni Buddha that include the Rhinoceros Sutra, avadānas, and abhidharma texts.

The condition of the scrolls indicates that they were already in poor condition and fragments by the time they were stored in the clay jars. Scholars concluded that the fragmented scrolls were given a ritual interment, much like Jewish texts stored in a genizah.

== Sanskrit and Brāhmī manuscripts ==
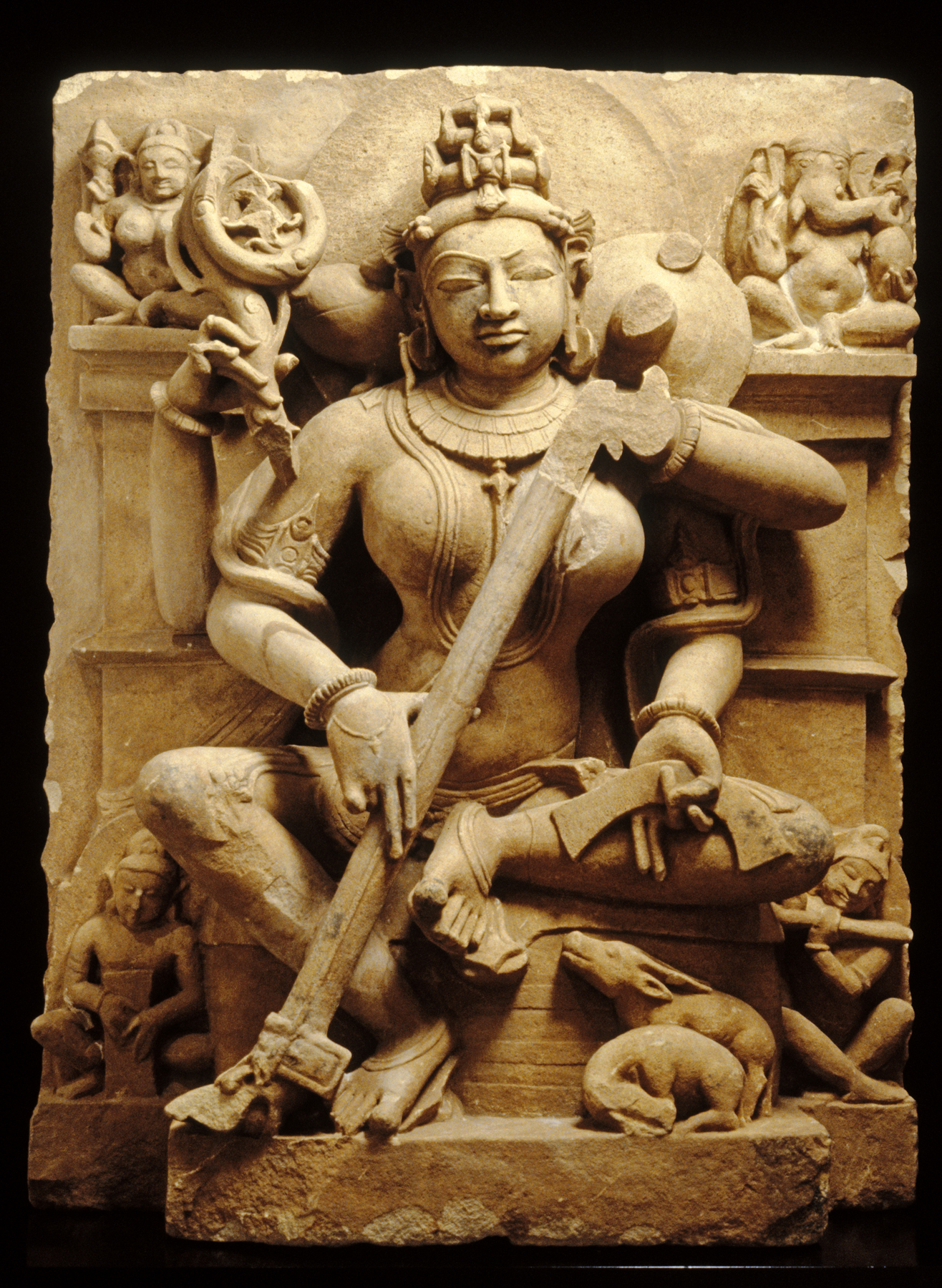
Sarasvati in Walters museum holding a manuscript

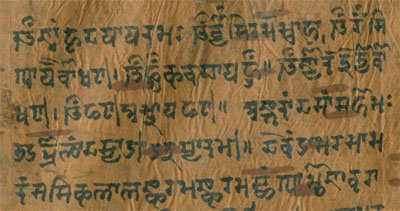
A Kashmiri manuscript on birch bark (c. 17th century)

The bark of Betula utilis (Himalayan Birch) has been used for centuries in India for writing scriptures and texts in various scripts. Its use was especially prevalent in historical Kashmir. Use of bark as paper has been mentioned by early Sanskrit writers such as Kalidasa (c. 4th century CE), Sushruta (c. 3rd century CE), and Varahamihira (6th century CE). In Kashmir, early scholars recounted that all of their books were written on Himalayan birch bark until the 16th century.

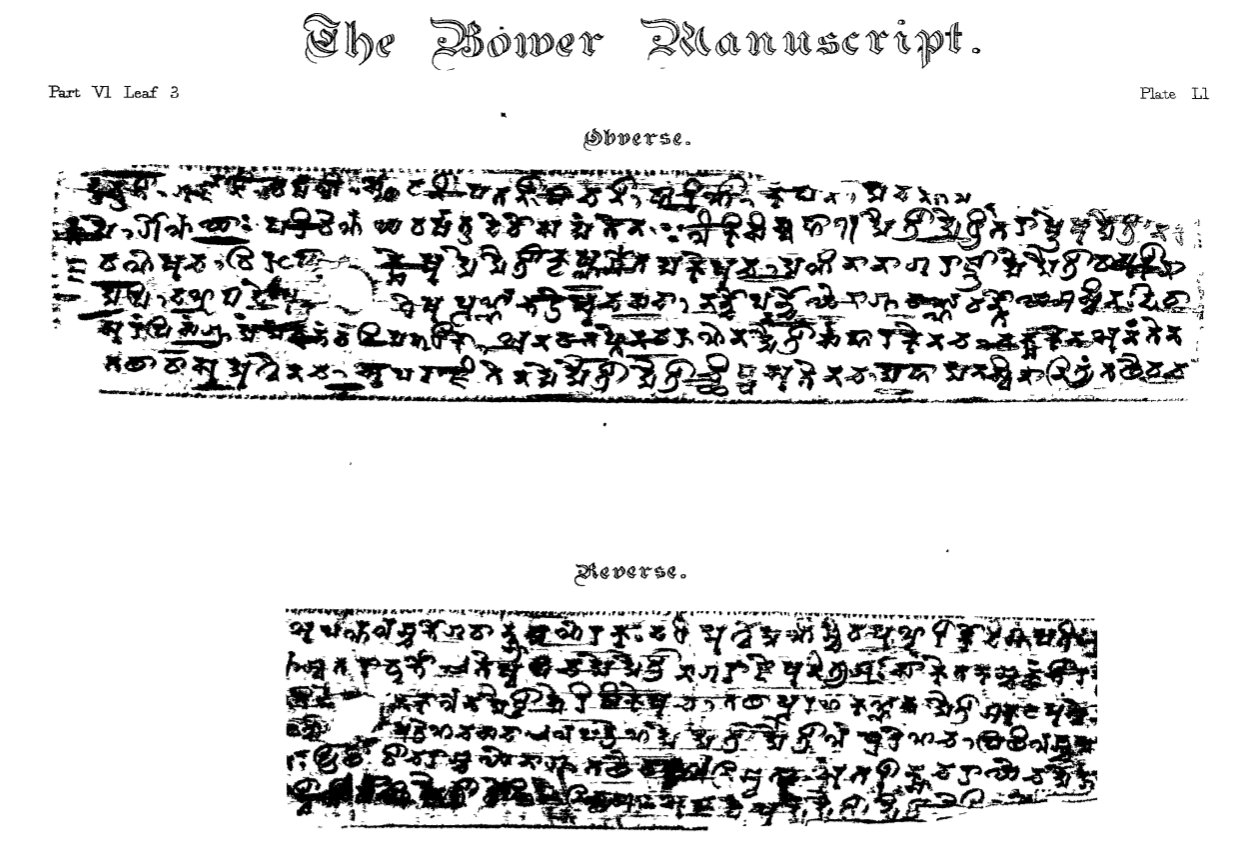
The Bower Manuscript on birch bark (c. 450 CE)

A fragment of a birch bark scroll in Sanskrit, in the Brāhmī script, was part of the British Library Gandhara scroll collection. It is presumed to be from Taxila, dating to sometime during the first few centuries CE. Birch bark manuscripts in Brāhmī script were discovered in an ancient Buddhist monastery in Jaulian, near Taxila in the Punjab in Pakistan, and dated to the 5th century CE.

The Bakhshali manuscript consists of seventy birch bark fragments written in Sanskrit and Prakrit, in the Śāradā script. Based on the language and content, it is estimated to be from the 2nd to 3rd century CE. The text discusses various mathematical techniques.

A large collection of birch bark scrolls were discovered in Afghanistan during the civil war in the late 20th and early 21st centuries, possibly in the Bamiyan Caves. The approximately 3,000 scroll fragments are in Sanskrit or Buddhist Sanskrit, in the Brāhmī script, and date to a period from the 2nd to 8th century CE.

The Bower Manuscript is one of the oldest Sanskrit texts on birch bark in the Brāhmī script. It includes several texts covering subjects including a medical treatise and proverbs. It was discovered in Kucha (currently in Aksu Prefecture in Xinjiang, China), an ancient Buddhist kingdom on the northern Silk Road, and is estimated to be from around 450 CE.

The Gilgit Manuscripts were Buddhist texts discovered in the Gilgit area of Pakistan in 1931 and include various sutras, including the Lotus Sutra, along with folk tales, medicine, and philosophy. They are dated to approximately the 5th to 6th centuries AD, and were written in Buddhist Sanskrit in the Śāradā script.

Manuscripts containing the Devīkavaca text, a hymn praising the goddess Durga, were thought to protect the person who carries them from evil influences like an amulet or charm. An example of one of these texts in Devanagari script from Nepal is held at Cambridge University Library (MS Add. 1578).

Birch bark is still used in some parts of India and Nepal for writing sacred mantras. This practice was first mentioned c. 8th or 9th century CE, in the Lakshmi Tantra.

In Indian sculpture, a birch bark manuscript is easily identified by the droop. A palm leaf manuscript is stiff.

== East Slavic manuscripts ==
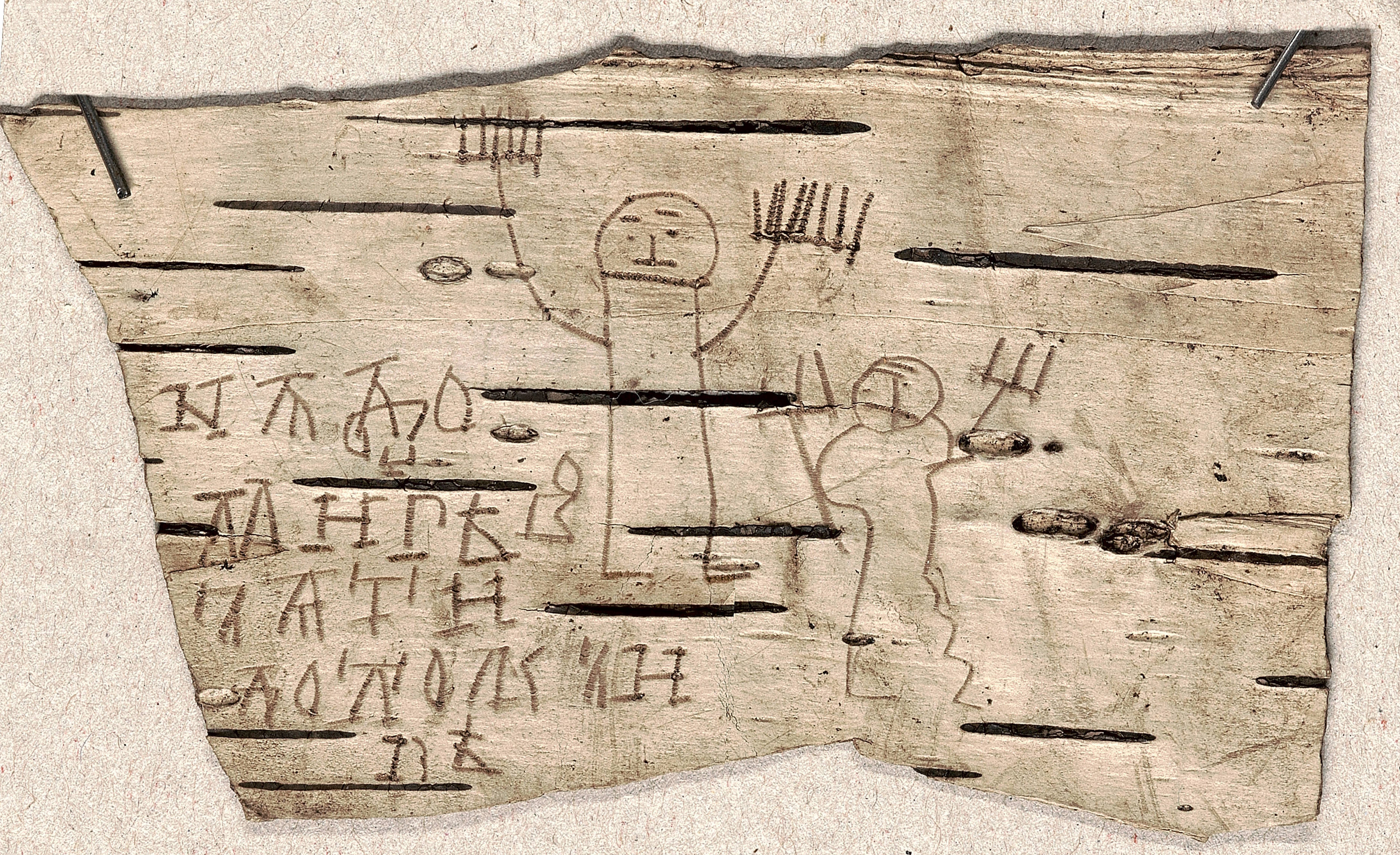
Birch-bark letter no. 202 contains spelling lessons and drawings made by a boy named Onfim; based on craftsmanship, experts estimate his age as between 6 and 7 at the time.

On July 26, 1951, during excavations in Novgorod, Nina Fyodorovna Akulova discovered the first Russian birch bark manuscript in a stratigraphic layer dated to around the year 1400. As of 2018, a total of 1,222 items have been discovered in 12 cities, of which 1,113 were found in Novgorod. In Russia, outside of Novgorod, the others were found in Staraya Russa (49), Torzhok (19), Smolensk (16), Pskov (8), Tver (5), Moscow (4), Ryazan (1), and Vologda (1). Outside of Russia, the rest were found in Mstsislaw (2) and Vitebsk (1) in Belarus, and in Zvenyhorod (3) in Ukraine. Of the birch bark documents unearthed in Russia, 90% were found in Novgorod and 97% were found in the same historic region as Novgorod.

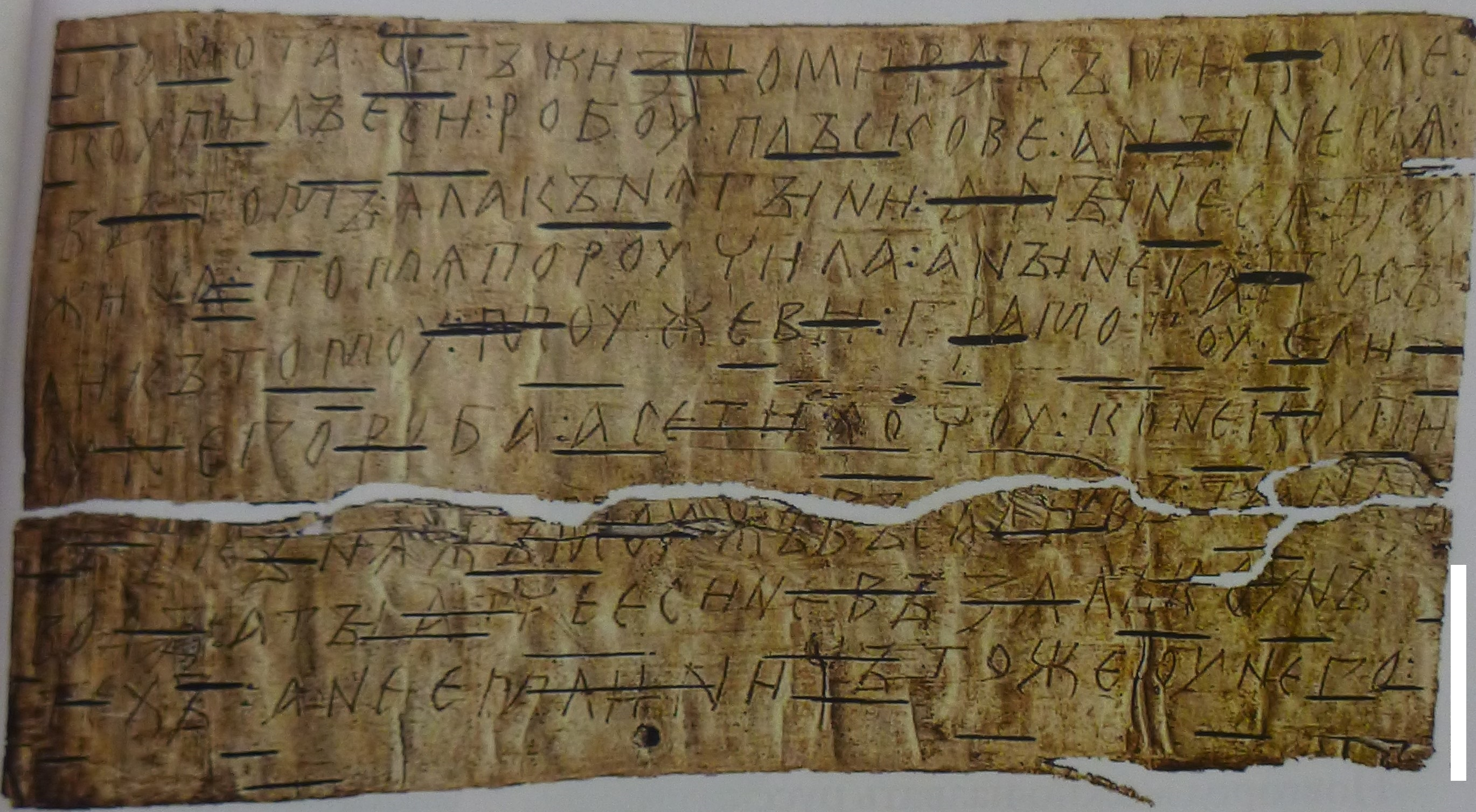
Birch-bark letter no. 109, c. 12th century, Veliky Novgorod; photograph

In Russian, the study of birch bark letters is informally known as berestologiya, from the word beryosta for the outer birch bark. Less than 3% of medieval Novgorod has been systematically excavated, and Valentin Yanin, the head of the Novgorod Archaeological Expedition, estimated that more than 20,000 remain to be discovered in Novgorod alone. Although the birch bark letters do not contain explicit dates, archaeologists have been able to date them with an accuracy of 10 to 15 years using methods including stratigraphy and dendrochronology. They can be dated even more precisely if historical names or events are mentioned.

The late discovery of birch documents, as well as their amazing state of preservation, is explained by a deep culture layer in Novgorod (up to eight meters, or 25 feet) and heavy waterlogged clay soil which prevents the access of oxygen. Serious excavations in Novgorod started only in 1932, although some attempts had been made in the 19th century. The earliest possible mention of their existence comes from authorities cited by Ibn al-Nadim, who described "Russians" writing upon "white wood" and gave an example of a "Russian" system of writing, adding, "I do not know whether these are words or single letters". Over two hundred stylies have also been found, mostly made of iron, some of bone or bronze.

Andrey Zaliznyak distinguished the manuscripts in Novgorod from "supra-dialectal Old Russian". Other manuscripts in Novgorod have also shown distinct north Russian dialect forms. As Church Slavonic was used in liturgical and religious writing, while a supra-regional variety was used for trade, it is unclear to what extent Novgorodians at the time would have considered them to have been separate languages or distinct registers of a single language. In addition, there is some variation in birch bark letters due to a lack of standardization that is seen with modern literary languages. Some texts are also written with a mixture of Church Slavonic and Old Novgorodian, but others are written in a pure vernacular. The language found in the birch bark manuscripts represents the closest approximation to the vernacular Old Russian language.

According to Yanin and Zaliznyak, most documents are ordinary letters by various people written in what is considered to be a vernacular dialect. The letters are of a personal or business character. A few documents include elaborate obscenities. Very few documents are written in Church Slavonic and only one in Old Norse. The school exercises and drawings by a young boy named Onfim have drawn much attention. Since the manuscripts were written by laypeople and consist of casual notes, it has been suggested that there was widespread literacy across large segments of urban society in medieval Russia; according to one estimate, 20% of the urban male population in Russian city-states were literate around the mid-13th century.

The contents of the birch bark writings included not only religious writings but also document death of princes, conclusions of peace, dignitary arrivals, folk verses and local proverbs, even casual doodles. While legal related matters include accusations, witnesses and the procedure of evidence, payments and fines, theft, fraud as well as wife-beating. One mundane personal writing reads "Sell the house and come to Smolensk or Kiev; bread is cheap; if you cannot come, write to me about your health".

One of the smallest birch bark letters found is no. 79, which is no larger than 6 x 1.5cm, while no. 397 is 4.6 x 2.6cm. On the opposite side of the scale, no. 519 is 47.2 x 16cm. Of those where the texts have been preserved in their entirety, most are no more than 20 words long, with a few exceeding 50 words. The longest one, found in Moscow (Moscow 3), contains 52 lines and about 370 words. The second longest, no. 531, is 166 words. The majority of surviving birch bark letters have missing text, with only a quarter of the entire corpus having complete texts.

== Finnic manuscripts ==
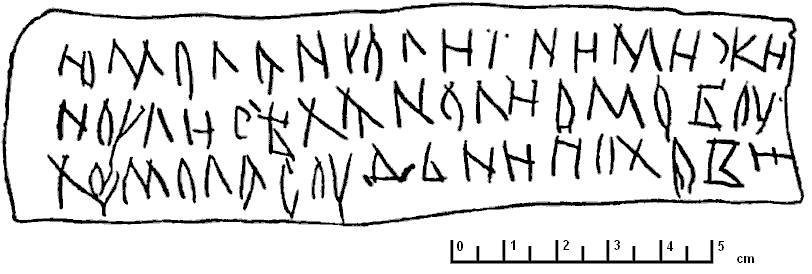
Birch-bark letter no. 292, oldest known Finnic language text (first half of the 13th century)

The birch bark letter no. 292 from the Novgorod excavations (unearthed in 1957) is the oldest known document in any Finnic language. It is dated to the beginning of the 13th century. The language used in the document is thought to be an archaic form of the language spoken in Olonets Karelia, a dialect of the Karelian language.

== Writings made in the Soviet Union ==
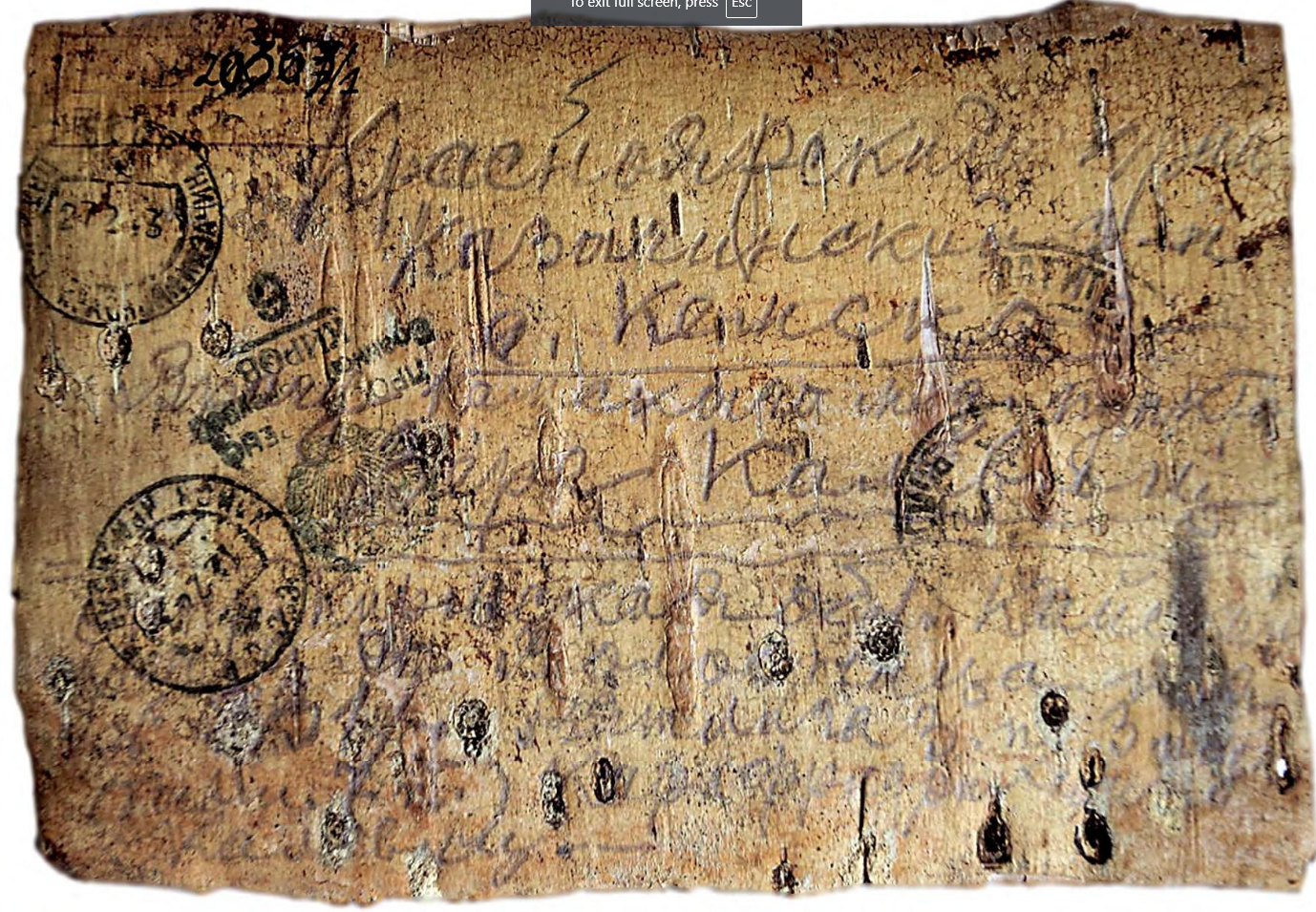
Birch bark letter from Siberia by Kārlis Roberts Kalevics (1877–1945)

There are birch bark letters written in the 20th century, most notably by victims of the repressions of the Soviet Stalinist regime. People in Soviet forced settlements and GULAG camps in Siberia used strips of birch bark to write letters to their loved ones back home, due to inaccessibility of paper. In 2023 Estonia, Latvia, Lithuania, Poland and Ukraine, applied to include birch bark letters from Siberia (1945–1965) in the UNESCO "Memory of the World" register.

During World War II, propaganda newspapers and leaflets published by guerrilla fighters were sometimes printed on birch bark due to shortage of paper.

== Indigenous Americans ==
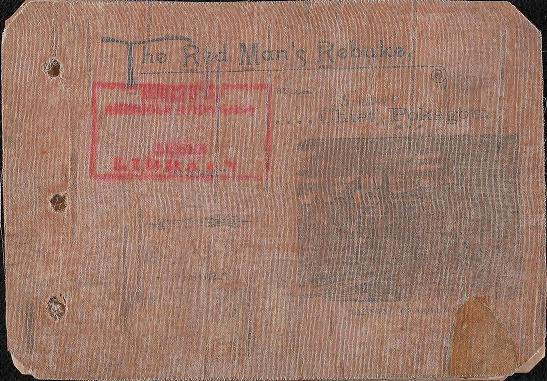
Original birchbark cover of The Red Man's Rebuke by Simon Pokagon

Indigenous peoples of the Great Lakes wrote on birchbark, notably the Mide society's birchbark scrolls. Simon Pokagon (Potawatomi, c. 1830–1899) wrote The Red Man's Rebuke and distributed it at the 1893 World's Columbian Exposition.

== See also ==
- Bryggen inscriptions, documents of the same age found in Bergen, Norway
- List of Russian archaeologists
- Mi'kmaq hieroglyphic writing
- See the Old Novgorod dialect article for samples of some texts
- Onfim – boy from medieval Novgorod, famous for his birch bark drawings
- Palm-leaf manuscript
- Russian archaeology
- Wiigwaasabak – birch bark scrolls of the Ojibwa people
- Yukaghir birch-bark carvings

== Sources ==
- Dekker, Simeon (2018). Old Russian Birchbark Letters: A Pragmatic Approach. Brill. ISBN 978-90-04-36238-3.
- Greenberg, Marc L. (20 January 2017). "Slavic". In Kapović, Mate (ed.). The Indo-European Languages. Taylor & Francis. pp. 519–551. ISBN 978-1-317-39153-1.
- Rakhlin, Natalia; Kornilov, Sergey A.; Grigorenko, Elena L. (12 October 2017). "Learning to Read Russian". Learning to Read across Languages and Writing Systems. Cambridge University Press. ISBN 978-1-107-09588-5.
- Schaeken, Jos (5 November 2018). Voices on Birchbark: Everyday Communication in Medieval Russia. BRILL. ISBN 978-90-04-38942-7.
