= Maironis =

Lithuanian Roman Catholic priest and poet

Jonas Mačiulis
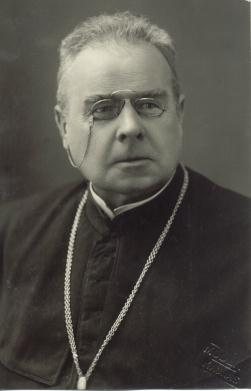
- Born: 2 November 1862; Pasandravys manor, Kaunas Governorate, Russian Empire
- Died: 28 June 1932 (aged 69); Kaunas, Lithuania
- Resting place: Kaunas Cathedral Basilica
- Occupations: Priest, poet, playwright
- Writing career
- Pen name: Maironis
- Genre: Romanticism

Maironis was the pen name of Jonas Mačiulis (2 November 1862 – 28 June 1932), a Lithuanian Roman Catholic priest and one of the most known and influential Lithuanian poets, especially of the period of the Lithuanian press ban. He was called the Bard of Lithuanian National Revival (Tautinio atgimimo dainius).

In his poetry, he expressed the national aspirations of the Lithuanian National Revival and was highly influential in Lithuanian society and poetry. The Maironian school in Lithuanian literature was named after him. Maironis was active in public life. However, the Lithuanian literary historian Juozas Brazaitis writes that Maironis was not.

== Life ==
=== Early years ===
Jonas Mačiulis was born on 2 November [O.S. 21 October] 1862 in Pasandravys manor, Šiluva county, Raseiniai district, in the former Grand Duchy of Lithuania, which was almost wholly annexed by the Russian Empire during the Partitions of the Polish–Lithuanian Commonwealth. Maironis' parents were free peasants who maintained close relations with the polonized Lithuanian nobility. Such a social environment formed the basis of Maironis' personality, leading to his deep religiosity and loyalty to tradition, free from atheistic or liberal influences. Socially, Maironis was uninvolved in the tensions between nobles and peasants, the rich and the poor, and did not become a representative of either side. Maironis was raised with a firm grounding in Lithuanian rural culture and was open to influence of any culture provided that it did not contradict Maironis' love for his land, his people, its past and traditions.

=== Ecclesiastical and academic career ===
During 1873–1883, Maironis was learning in the gymnasium of Kaunas. In sixth class, he began writing verses in Polish. In 1883, he entered the Kiev University to study literature. He only studied there for a single semester. He left the university after the lectures did not satisfy his hopes and the students' stances towards religion were strange to him, so, Maironis returned to Kaunas in 1884 and entered Kaunas Priest Seminary. Maironis studied in the seminary until 1888. In the seminary, Lithuanian culture and the use of the Lithuanian language were encouraged by the priest, then Auxiliary bishop, Antanas Baranauskas. This influenced Maironis to decide in favour of Lithuanianness and to create art in the Lithuanian language, thus leading to him being important in the Lithuanian National Revival.

In 1888-1892, Maironis studied in the Saint Petersburg Roman Catholic Theological Academy, where he mostly studied moral theology and for his work De iustitia et jure, he received a Master's degree. In 1891, Maironis was ordained a priest. From 1892 to 1894, he was professor in Kaunas Priest Seminary, where he taught the dogmatic theology and catechism.

==== In Saint Petersburg ====
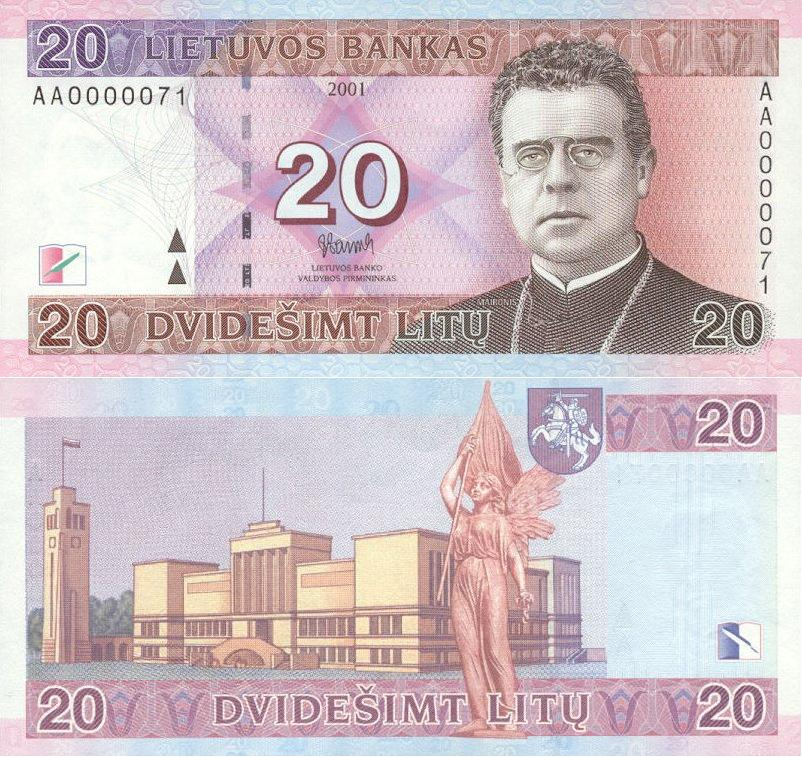
Maironis on 20 Lithuanian litas banknote (2001)

From 1894 to 1909, he was Theology Professor in Saint Petersburg Roman Catholic Theological Academy and was made the academic inspector in 1900. For a few years, he was also the prefect and spiritual father. In 1903, he received the degree of Doctor of Theology. In the Academy, the Department of Sociology was established at the insistence of Maironis. Around 1900, Maironis was one of the founders of the Lithuanian Language Rights' Restoration Union (Lithuanian: Lietuvių kalbos teisių atkūrimo sąjunga).

Maironis' presence in academia had indirect influence on Lithuanian culture in Saint Petersburg, as the presence of a Lithuanian poet in the functions of an inspector raised patriotic pride amongst the Lithuanian students and allowed the entry of more Lithuanians into professorship. Moreover, this allowed Maironis to authoritatively support the works of Lithuanians in the Imperial Russian capital, for example, the Lithuanian newspaper Lietuvių laikraštis of Antanas Smilga. This newspaper was the first legally-printed Lithuanian newspaper in the Russian Empire following the end of Lithuanian press ban in 1904. In 1905, Maironis was a member of the Commission formed by the Minister of Education of the Russian Empire to prepare a Lithuanian language program for Lithuanian schools. Together with others, he prepared a draft program of the Christian Democratic Party for the Great Seimas of Vilnius of 1905.

==== In Lithuania ====
From 1908, Maironis was member of the Lithuanian Scientific Society in Vilnius. In 1909, he was invited as rector of the Kaunas Priest Seminary. In his first public speech, he spoke in Lithuanian, breaking with the tradition of speaking either in Latin or Polish. This was a breakthrough moment for Lithuanianness in the seminary. Outside of the seminary, Maironis was important to show that Lithuanians had their own intellectual high ecclesiastical figures, as Maironis was Mogilev's honorary canon since 1902 and later also the prelate of the Samogitian Capitula from 1912. He aided Roman Catholic Lithuanian cultural organisations by allowing them to establish their headquarters in the former Pac Palace, which Maironis had bought. Maironis remained the seminary's rector until his death in 1932, except when the seminary was closed during World War I. Maironis left Kaunas only during short breaks during summer when he went to Palanga or when the seminary was closed during World War I.

=== World War I ===
During the First World War, Maironis lived in several places such as Krekenava, Upytė and others. He was persuaded to travel with the Lithuanian delegation to the Conference of Bern in 1917, which was one of the Lithuanian conferences during World War I.

=== Interwar ===
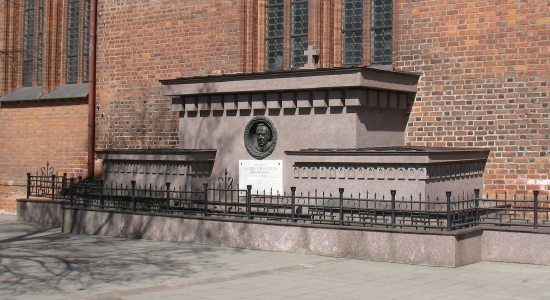
Maironis' tomb monument at Kaunas Cathedral

Maironis was rejoicing at the re-establishment of Lithuanian independence, but he was disappointed with certain social ills he witnessed with the rebellious wave following independence. He disapproved of the Interwar Land reform in Lithuania as it was contrary to his deep social conservativism. In this respect, the Tautininkai were closer to him than the Christian Democrats. His political leanings were partly also because of personal relations. While avoiding the public spotlight, Maironis preferred to frequent the intellectual artist circles, where poetry, song and music predominated.

In 1922, Maironis was elected the Professor of Moral Theology in the Faculty of Theology-Philosophy of the newly-founded University of Lithuania. For a short time, he taught courses on general and Lithuanian literature. The students were impressed by the clarity and simplicity of the teaching, looking at the substance of the question rather than the rhetoric. Later that year, Maironis was elected the honorary professor of the University of Lithuania on 15 December 1922. A decade later, the same institution gave him the degree of honorary doctor of literature on 29 January 1932.

== Works ==
Maironis wrote numerous poems. Some of them are contained in his most famous collection of poems, Pavasario balsai (The Voices of Spring). Maironis's works also include: poems Lietuva (1888), Tarp skausmų į garbę (1893), Znad Biruty (1904), Jaunoji Lietuva (1907), Raseinių Magdė (1909), Mūsų vargai (1913), three historical dramas: Kęstučio mirtis (1921), Vytautas pas kryžiuočius (1925), Didysis Vytautas - Karalius (1930), as well as works from the fields of theology, history (Apsakymai apie Lietuvos praeiga, 1886), sociology, literature and journalistic texts. Znad Biruty is the only surviving work by Maironis written in Polish.

== Death and legacy ==
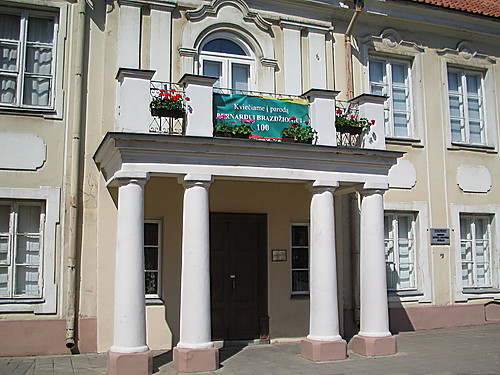
Maironis's former house; now the Maironis Lithuanian Literature Museum in Kaunas

He died in Kaunas in 1932, aged 69. He was buried in a tomb monument constructed outside the Kaunas Cathedral Basilica. He personally chose the sentence on his tomb ("Kaip man gaila to balto senelio...", which means "How sorry I am for that white grandfather ...") from his poem Raseinių Magdė. His former house in Kaunas is now the Maironis Lithuanian Literature Museum.

== Bibliography ==
- Brazaitis, Juozas (1959). "Maironis-Mačiulis". Lietuvių enciklopedija (in Lithuanian). Vol. 17. Boston. pp. 111–116.
- Zaborskaitė, Vanda (2022). "Maironis". Visuotinė lietuvių enciklopedija (in Lithuanian). Archived from the original on 23 March 2022.
- Unknown (2022). "Maironis (Jonas Mačiulis)". Žemaičių žemė (in Lithuanian).
