= Onfim =

13th-century Russian child artist

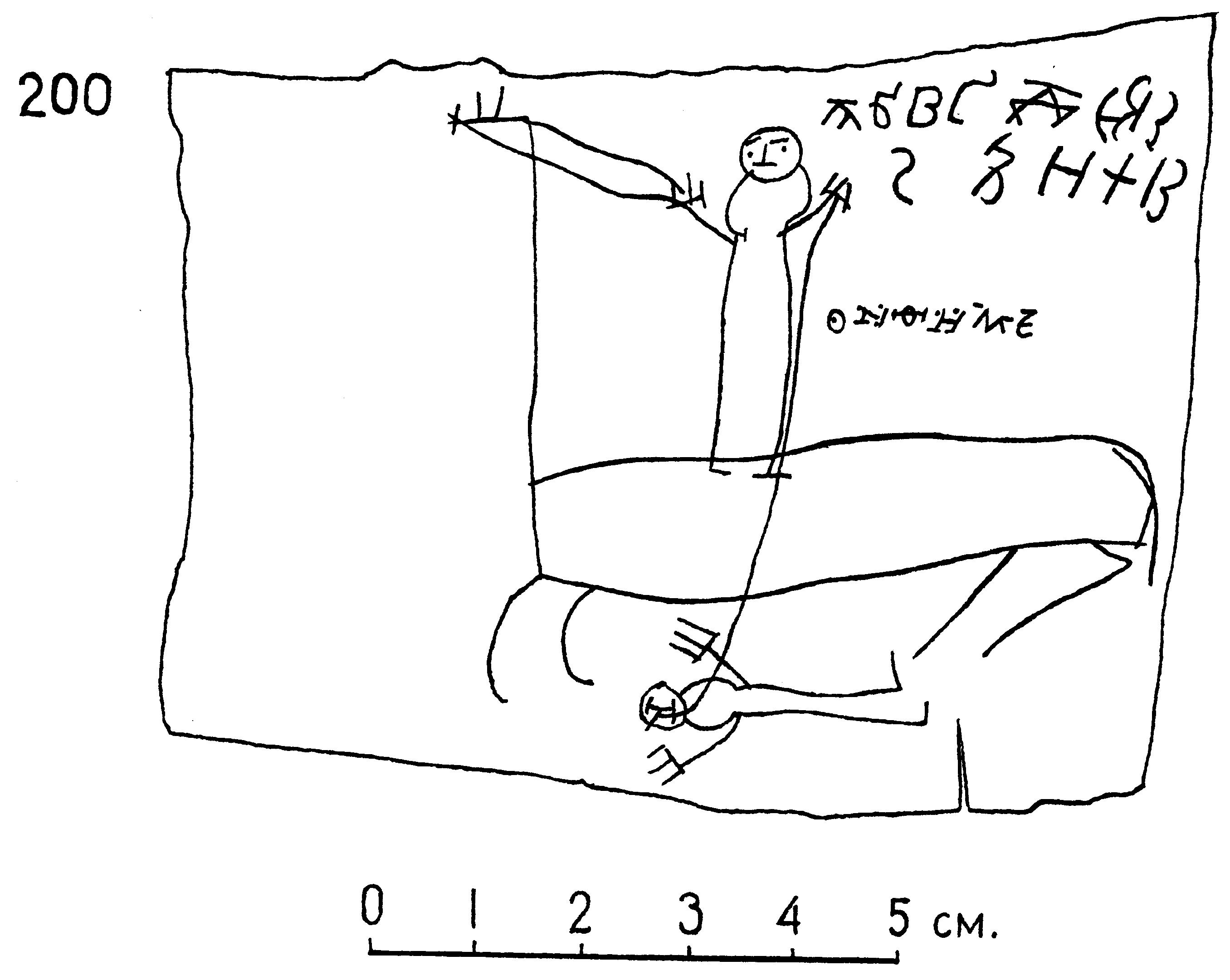
One of Onfim's schoolwork doodles (no. 200), depicting himself as a horseman slaying a person. (Note: Note his own name (Онѳиме) written beside the rider, along with the Cyrillic letters ⟨А⟩ to ⟨К⟩.)

Onfim (Russian: Онфим; Old Novgorodian: Онѳимє, romanized: Onthime) was a 13th-century Russian boy who lived in the city of Novgorod. He left his notes and homework exercises scratched in soft birch bark, which was preserved in the clay soil of Novgorod. They are dated to the mid-13th century.

Onfim, who was most likely six or seven at the time, wrote in the Old Novgorod dialect, a historical variety of Russian. Besides letters and syllables, he drew "battle scenes and drawings of himself and his teacher."

== Background ==
Novgorod, officially Veliky Novgorod, is the administrative center of Novgorod Oblast, Russia. At the time Onfim lived, it was the capital of the Novgorod Republic, a powerful city-state that formally became independent in the 12th century. Novgorod was also a former capital of medieval Russia. As a result, it is viewed as the birthplace of various aspects of Russian culture and art.

Scholars believe that the Novgorod Republic had an unusually high level of literacy for its time, with literacy apparently widespread across social classes and among both sexes. More broadly, the evidence suggests that literacy was relatively common in medieval Russian urban society; according to one estimate, 20% of the urban male population in Russian city-states was literate around the mid-13th century. Before the discovery of the birch bark manuscripts in Novgorod, most scholars tended to believe that the population of medieval Russia was almost entirely illiterate; it was assumed that only the wealthiest urban circles, particularly the clergy, were literate. Since then, scholars have revised this view.

Some 200 kilometres (120 mi) south of Saint Petersburg, the city is surrounded by birch forests, whose bark was used for centuries by the locals for writing since it was soft and easily scratched. Following World War II, the city was subject to systematic archaeological excavation. Since 1951, more than 1,100 pieces of birch bark with writing on it have been found, and more continue to be discovered. Novgorod is therefore one of the most important archaeological sites in Europe. Onfim's writings (nos. 199–208, 210) were first found at the Nerevsky excavation site in 1956. Another letter (no. 331) was later found in an adjacent area and added to the collection.

In Russian, a birch bark manuscript is called beresta (береста, 'birch bark', pl. берёсты, beryosty), and the academic field that studies them is called berestology (берестология, berestologiya). The great number of beryosty is indicative of a high rate of literacy among the population, as is the large number of styluses.

== Onfim's writings ==
Onfim left seventeen known birch bark items dating to the mid-13th century. Twelve of those have illustrations, five only text. One of the drawings features a knight on a horse, with Onfim's name written next to him, stabbing someone on the ground with a lance, with scholars speculating that Onfim pictured himself as the knight. The writings are clearly learning exercises: Onfim practiced by writing out the alphabet, repeating syllables, and writing psalms—texts that were presumably familiar to him. His writing includes phrases such as "Lord, help your servant Onfim" and fragments from Psalms 6:2 and 27:3. Most of Onfim's writing consists of citations from the Book of Psalms.

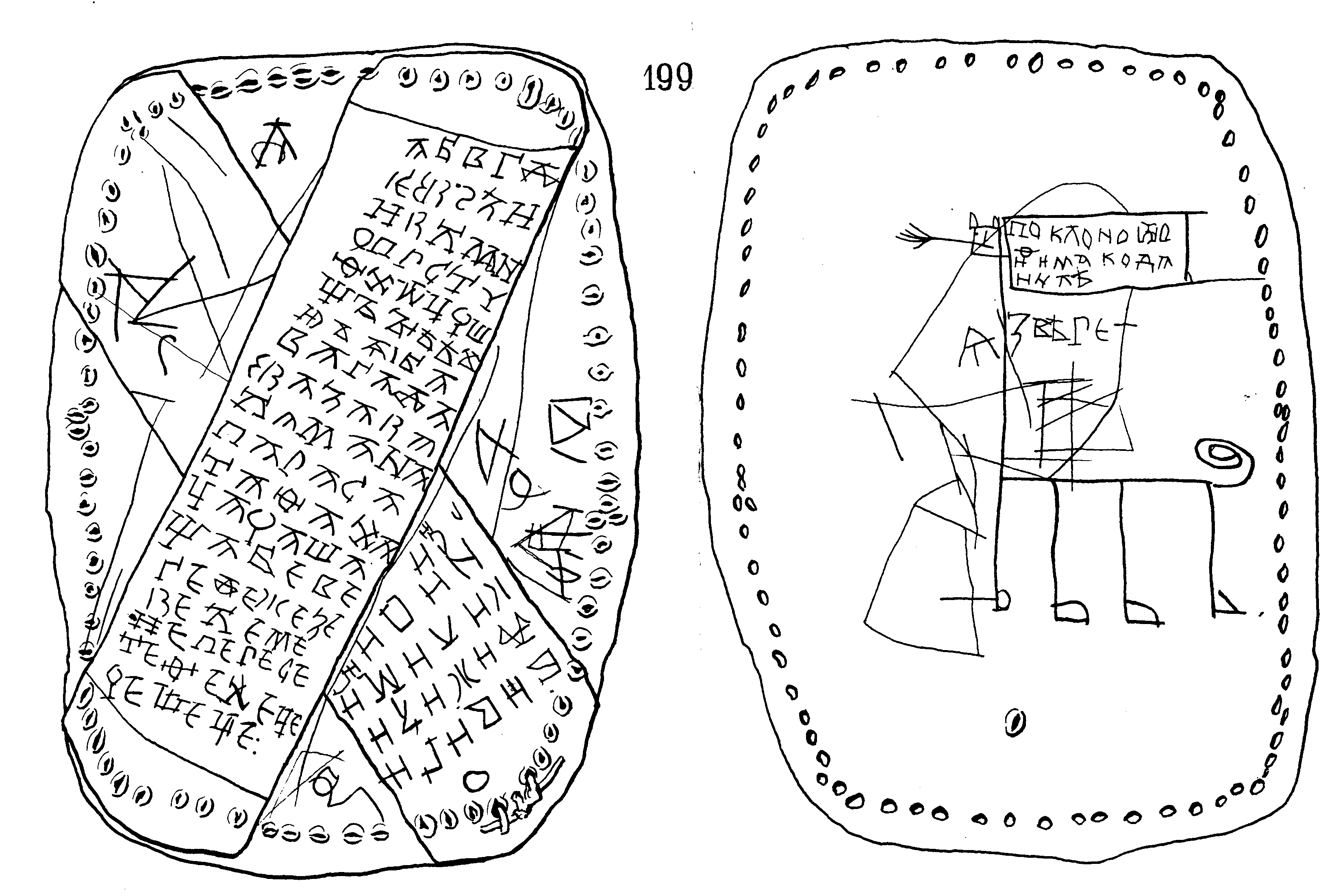
Onfim's homework exercises and "I am a wild beast," c. 1260 (no. 199).

Onfim's illustrations include pictures of knights, horses, arrows, and slain enemies. One image, "a portrait of himself, disguised as a fantastic animal," is found on item no. 199 (pictured; it was originally the bottom of a basket made of birch bark), which contains a picture of a four-legged beast with a long neck, pointy ears, and a curly tail. The beast either has an arrow with feathers in its mouth or is spewing fire; one of the accompanying texts says "I am a wild beast". Another text says "Greetings from Onfim to Danilo," most likely a friend or classmate of Onfim. The number of fingers on the pictured people's hands varies from three to eight; Onfim had yet to learn how to count.

The rows of five letters each on the other side of 199 are an alphabet exercise. On item no. 205 (not pictured in this article), Onfim wrote the Cyrillic alphabet and added "On[f]," for his name, in the middle; below that alphabet is what some researchers see as a boat with oars. Item no. 206 contains alphabetic exercises and "'portraits' of little Onfim and his friends." Interestingly, Onfim did not use the yers (ъ ь), and instead replaced them with О and Е; for instances, in item no. 199, Onfim wrote поклоно (poklono; "bow [in supplication] (lit.); greetings, regards (fig.)") (cf. Russian поклонъ; as spelt before the 1918 spelling reform) and ꙁвѣре (zvěre, "wild beast"; cf. Russian звѣрь and зверь; as spelt before and after the 1918 spelling reform, respectively).

In one of the birch bark items, no. 206, a sequence of four letters with a titlo on top was interpreted as a number and therefore as the current year in which he was carrying out his exercises, in this case, the year 1263. This was seen as plausible as it corresponded to the age of the birch bark (c. 1240–1260). However, this interpretation remained the subject of debate for decades. A new interpretation, viewed as more plausible, suggests that the letters refer to the first words of the six-o'clock troparion lže v šestу den' že i čas [...] ("Who on the sixth day and hour [...]"), and Onfim used to practice his writing by reproducing liturgical texts.

== Gallery ==
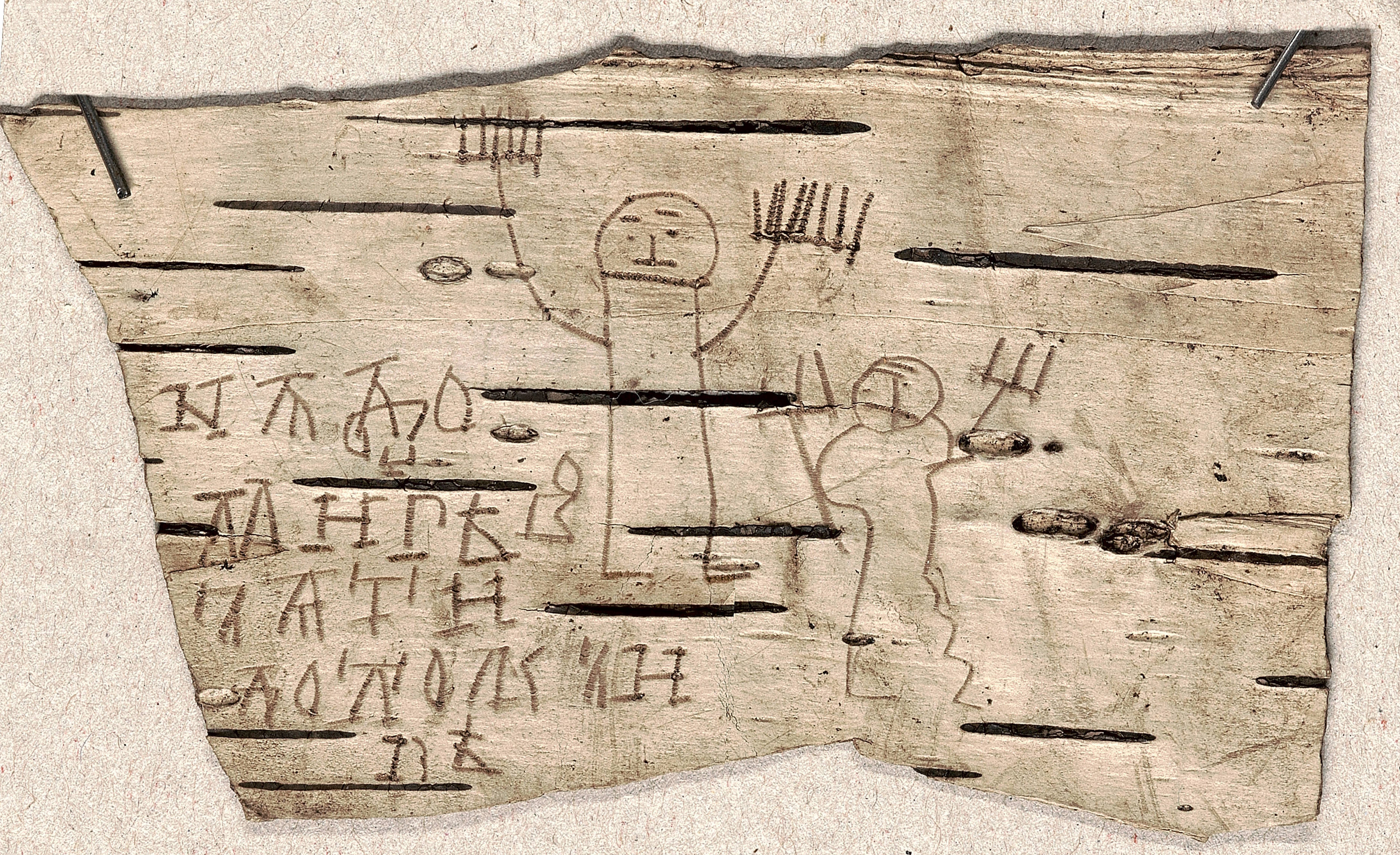
Birch-bark letter no. 202: spelling lessons and drawings.

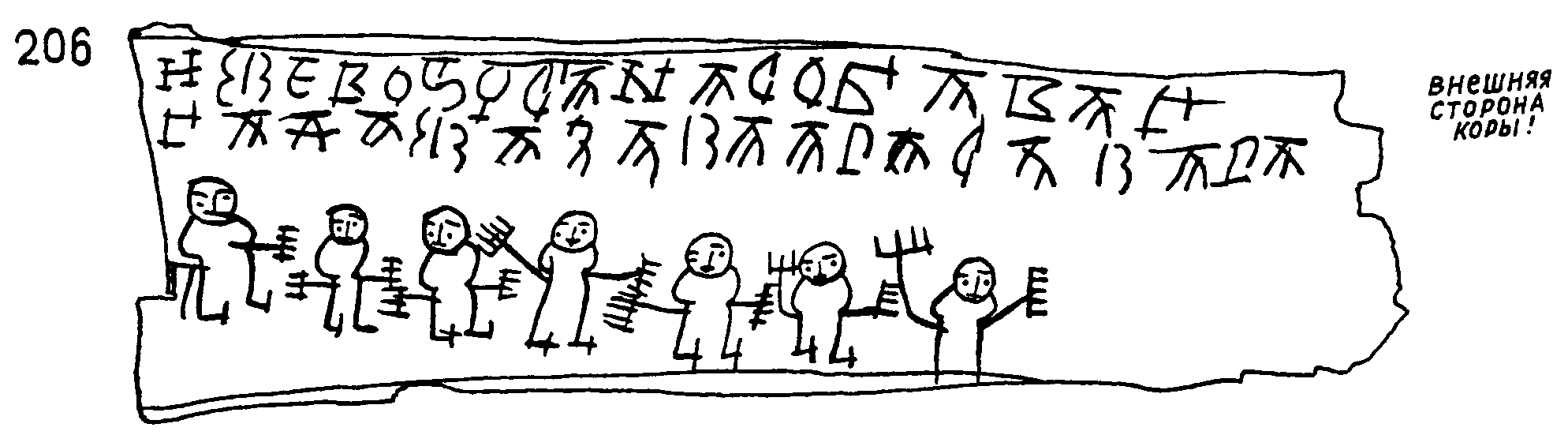
Item no. 206: "Now when the sixth hour," a series of syllables, and portraits.

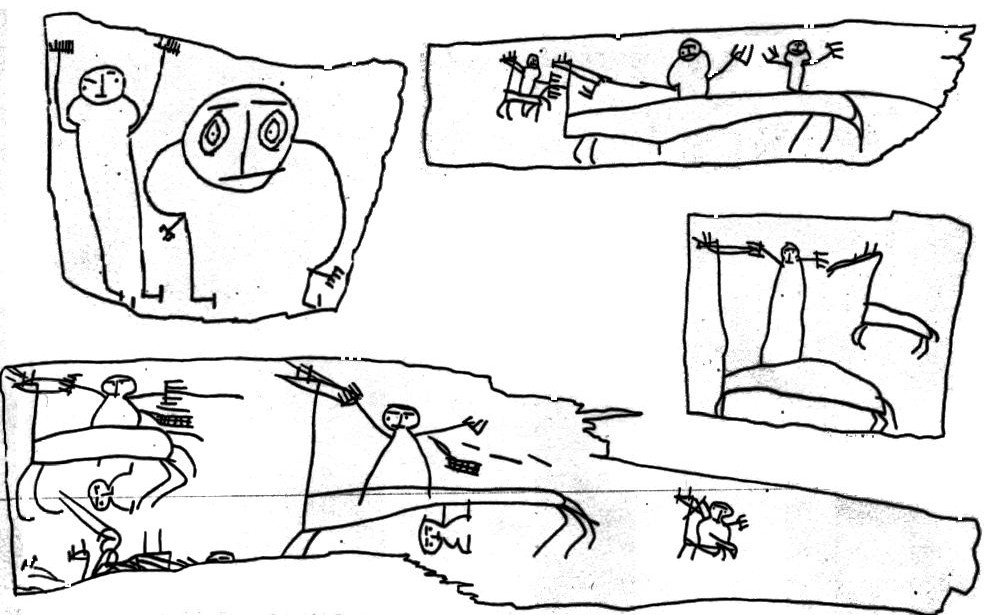
Various drawings.

== Bibliography ==
- Baldy, René; Fabre, Daniel (2009). "Des enfants dessinateurs au Moyen Âge" [Children who were artists in the Middle Ages]. Gradhiva (in French). 9: 152–163. doi:10.4000/gradhiva.1440. ISSN 0764-8928.
- Chambers, John H. (16 October 2008). Everyone's History. Xlibris. ISBN 978-1-4628-2167-9.
- Dekker, Simeon (19 February 2018). Old Russian Birchbark Letters: A Pragmatic Approach. BRILL. ISBN 978-90-04-35320-6.
- Feldbrugge, Ferdinand J. M. (2 October 2017). "Novgorod Birch-Bark Documents". A History of Russian Law: From Ancient Times to the Council Code (Ulozhenie) of Tsar Aleksei Mikhailovich of 1649. BRILL. pp. 288–290. ISBN 978-90-04-35214-8.
- Franklin, Simon (2010). Writing, Society and Culture in Early Rus, c. 950 –1300. Cambridge University Press. ISBN 978-1-139-43454-6.
- Freeze, Gregory (28 March 2002). Russia: A History, New Edition (2nd ed.). Oxford: Oxford University Press. ISBN 0-19-860511-0.
- Kent, Allen; Lancour, Harold; Daily, Jay E. (1979). "Slavic Paleography". Encyclopedia of Library and Information Science. Vol. 27. CRC. ISBN 978-0-8247-2027-8.
- Lifschutz-Loseff, Lev (1977). "Children's literature, Russian". In Weber, Harry Butler; Rollberg, P. (eds.). The Modern Encyclopedia of East Slavic, Baltic, and Eurasian Literatures. Academic International Press. pp. 71–87. ISBN 978-0-87569-070-4.
- Tobin, Daniel Bird; Bird, S. Elizabeth (December 2018). "Theatrical Performance and the Archaeological Imagination: A Transformational Journey". Anthropology and Humanism. 43 (2): 196–210. doi:10.1111/anhu.12215.
- Rakhlin, Natalia; Kornilov, Sergey A.; Grigorenko, Elena L. (12 October 2017). "Learning to Read Russian". Learning to Read across Languages and Writing Systems. Cambridge University Press. ISBN 978-1-107-09588-5.
- Rybina, Elena Aleksandrovna (1 December 2018). "Берестяная грамота № 206 мальчика Онфима. История интерпретации" [Birch bark manuscript no. 206 by the boy Onfim: a history of its interpretation]. Сибирские исторические исследования (in Russian) (4). Moscow State University: 130–145. doi:10.17223/2312461x/22/7.
- Schaeken, Jos (2012). Stemmen Op Berkenbast: Berichten Uit Middeleeuws Rusland: Dagelijks Leven en Communicatie [Voices on birch bark: messages from medieval Russia — daily life and communication] (in Dutch). Amsterdam University Press. ISBN 9789087281618.
- Schaeken, Jos (2017). "Comments on birchbark documents found in the twenty-first century" Замечания к берестяным грамотам, найденным в XXI веке. Russian Linguistics. 41 (2). Springer: 123–149. ISSN 0304-3487.
- Schaeken, Jos (5 November 2018). Voices on Birchbark: Everyday Communication in Medieval Russia. BRILL. ISBN 978-90-04-38942-7.
- Thorpe, Deborah Ellen (31 December 2016). "Young hands, old books: Drawings by children in a fourteenth-century manuscript, LJS MS. 361". Cogent Arts & Humanities. 3 (1) 1196864. doi:10.1080/23311983.2016.1196864. PMC 4978464.
- Yanin, Valentin L. (2006). "Medieval Novgorod". The Cambridge History of Russia: Volume 1: From Early Rus' to 1689. Cambridge University Press. pp. 188–210. doi:10.1017/CHOL9780521812276.009. ISBN 978-1-139-05410-2.
- Yanin, Valentin L. (2009) [1969]. "The Dig at Novgorod". In Thomas Riha (ed.). Readings in Russian Civilization, Volume 1: Russia Before Peter the Great, 900–1700 (2nd ed.). University of Chicago Press. pp. 47–59. ISBN 978-0-226-71843-9.
