= Maironis Lithuanian Literature Museum =

Museum in Kaunas, Lithuania

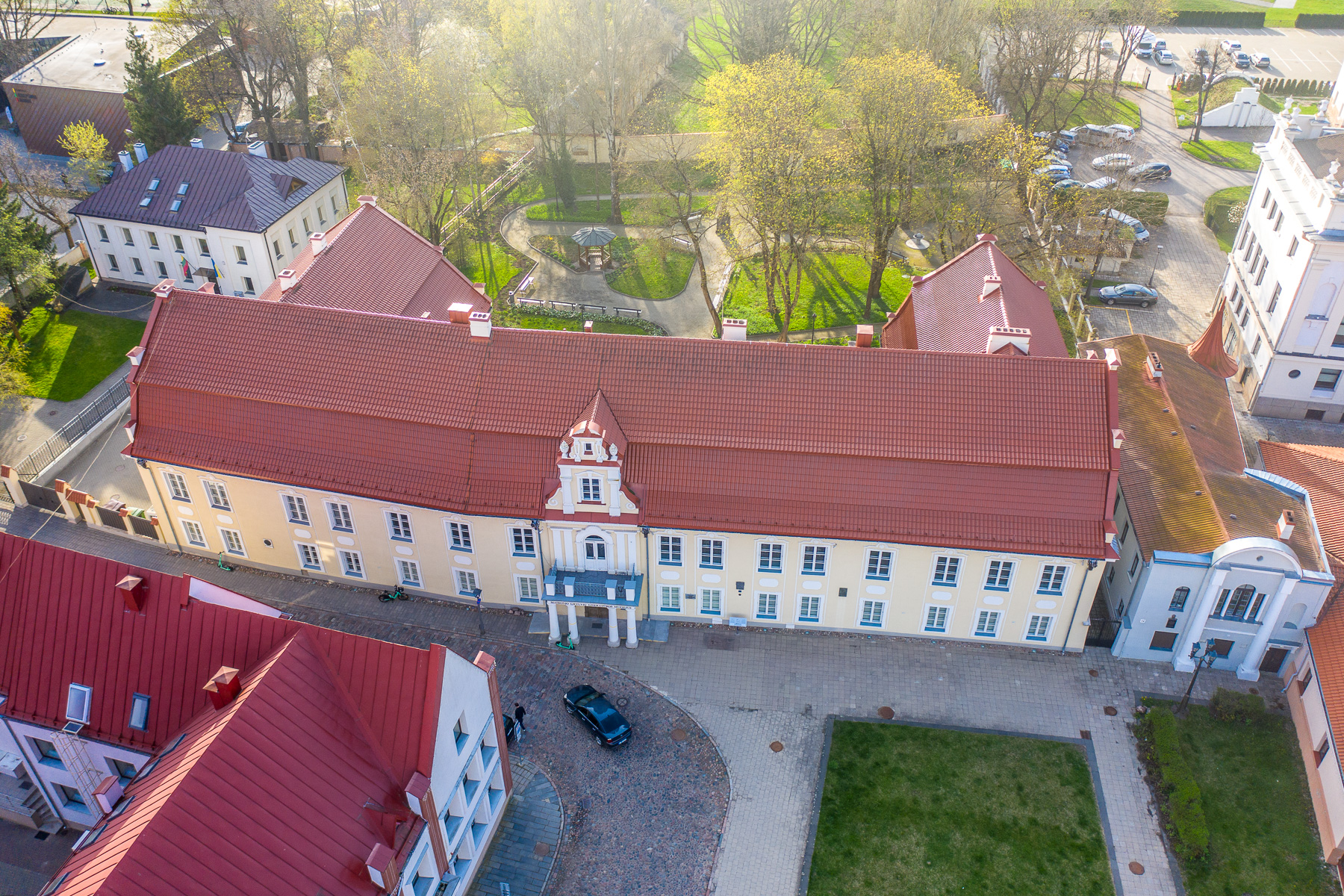
Maironis Lithuanian Literature Museum, located in the late Baroque Siručiai Palace

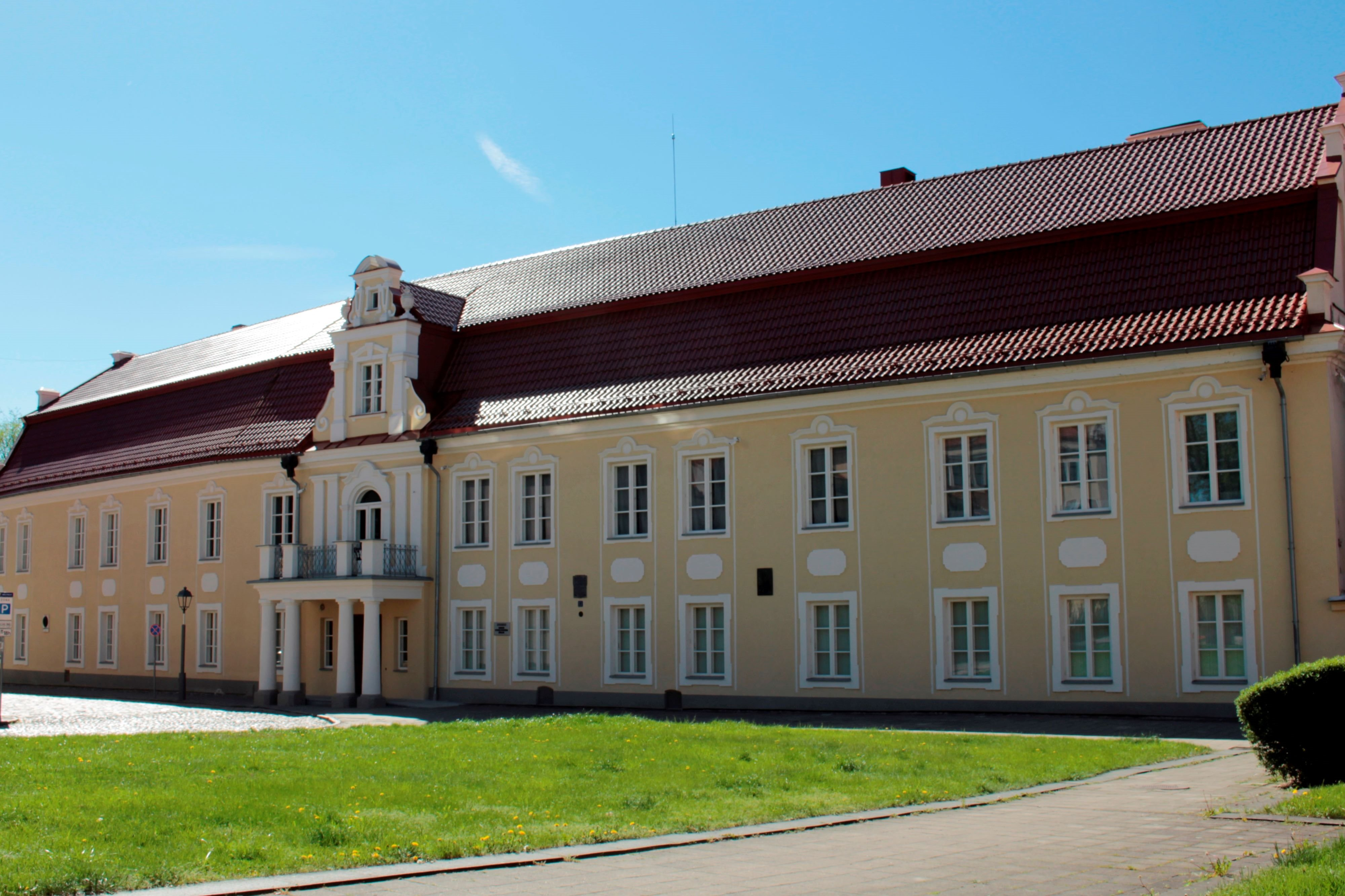
Museum in 2018

The Maironis Lithuanian Literature Museum (Lithuanian: Maironio lietuvių literatūros muziejus) is located in the Siručiai Palace of Kaunas, Lithuania. It contains the former home of Lithuanian priest and poet Jonas Mačiulis-Maironis, who purchased the building in 1909. The museum opened in 1936. It contains the fully renovated living quarters of the poet, complete with his belongings and furniture.

== History ==
The Maironis Lithuanian Literature Museum is located in the Siručiai Palace of Kaunas, Lithuania. The building where it is established was built in 1742 by Kaunas city court foreman Simonas Sirutis and was purchased by Lithuanian priest and poet Jonas Mačiulis-Maironis in 1909. The building has previously been built as three separate houses, then joined together and used as a grand mansion, later turned into a hospital and a Russian barracks. The vaults in the basement are 15th and 16th century and are some of the oldest in the city. They were at one time used as a prison.

Having renovated the building somewhat, Maironis turned the second floor into an apartment and living quarters for himself, and leaving the rest of the mansion for use of Lithuanian cultural organizations. A number of cultural organizations established themselves in the building including the first Lithuanian library-athenaeum in Kaunas, the Catholic Women's Association, a craft school, the editorial offices of the magazine Garnys, and a publisher.

== Museum ==
The museum was opened as the Maironis Museum in 1936, four years after the death of Maironis. The literature museum includes the fully renovated flat, which is still furnished with all Maironis's belongings, and retains the original wall and ceiling decorations of the interwar period.

== See also ==
- List of music museums
