= Birch bark =

Tree bark

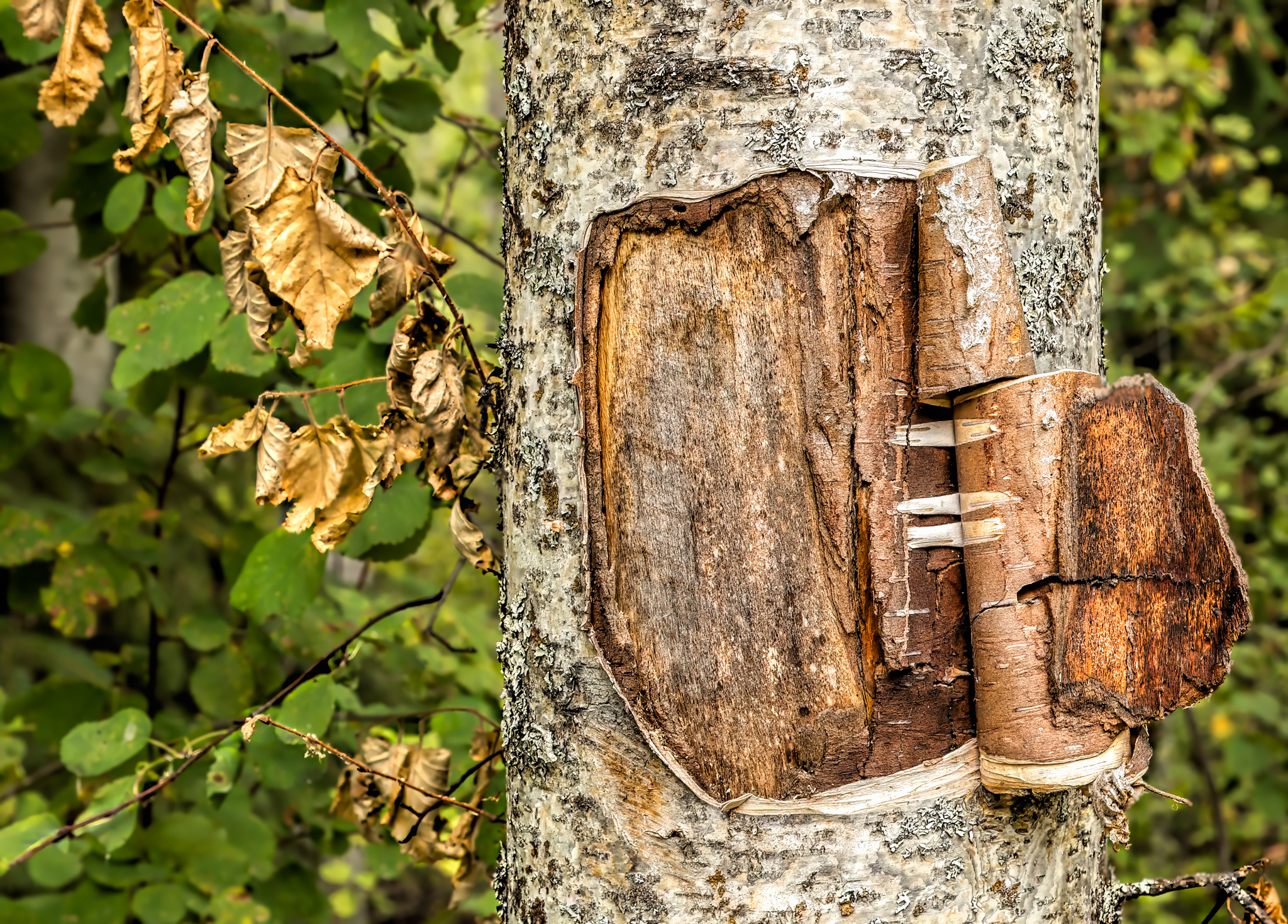
A trunk of a birch, with part of bark cut out

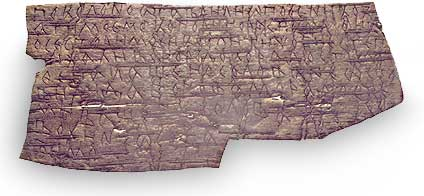
A Russian birch bark letter from the 14th century

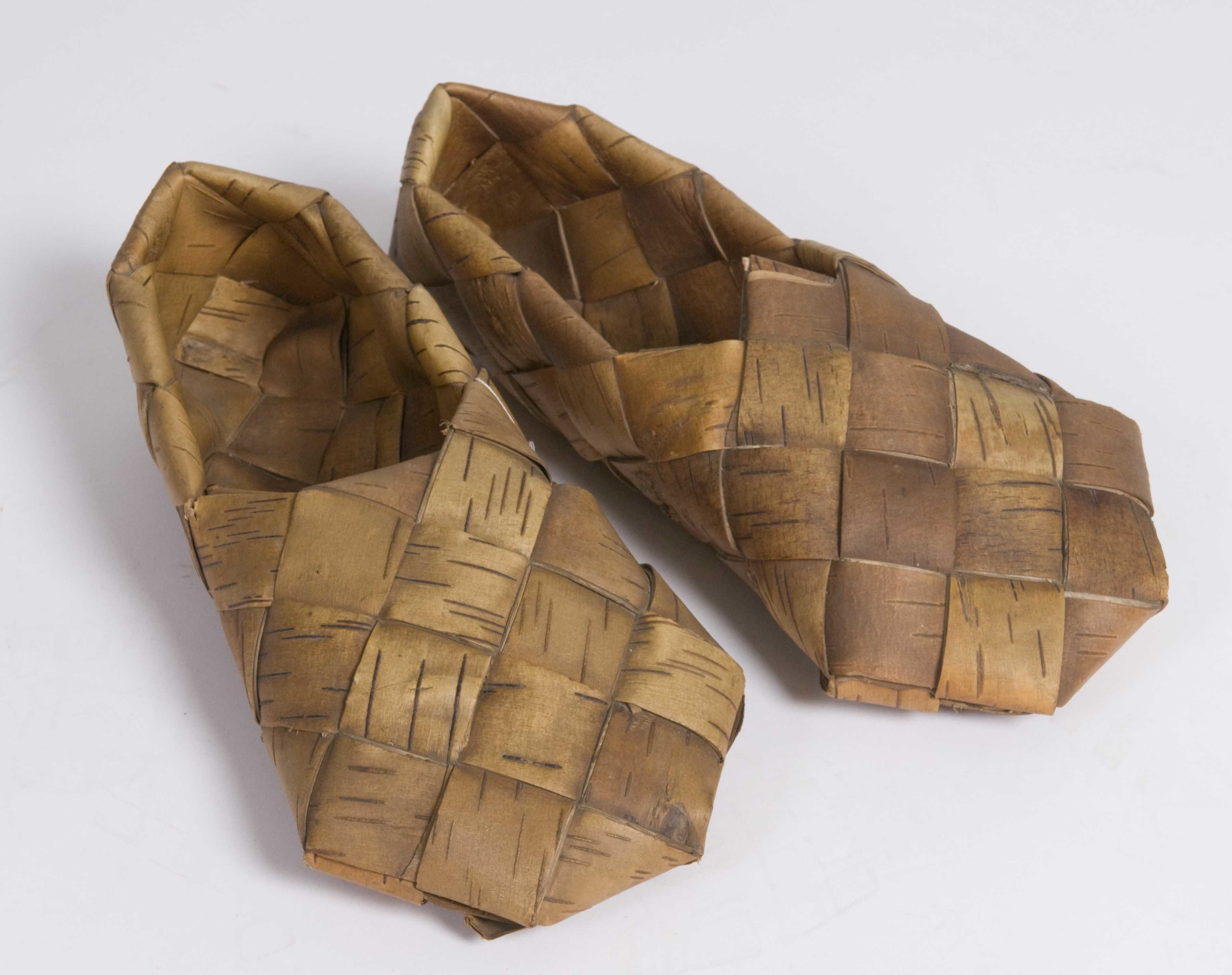
Birchbark shoes

Birch bark or birchbark is the bark of several Eurasian and North American birch trees of the genus Betula.

For all practical purposes, birch bark's main layers are the outer dense layer, white on the outside, and the inner porous layer (cambium). For vast majority of crafts, the outer bark is used. In many languages it has a separate name. For example, in Russian "birch bark" is beryozovaya kora, while the outer birch bark is beresta or beryosta.

The strong and water-resistant cardboard-like outer bark can be easily cut, bent, and sewn, which has made it a valuable building, crafting, and writing material, since pre-historic times. Today, birch bark remains a popular type of wood for various handicrafts and arts.

Birch bark also contains substances of medicinal and chemical interest. Some of those products (such as betulin) also have fungicidal properties that help preserve bark artifacts, as well as food preserved in bark containers.

== Collection and storage ==
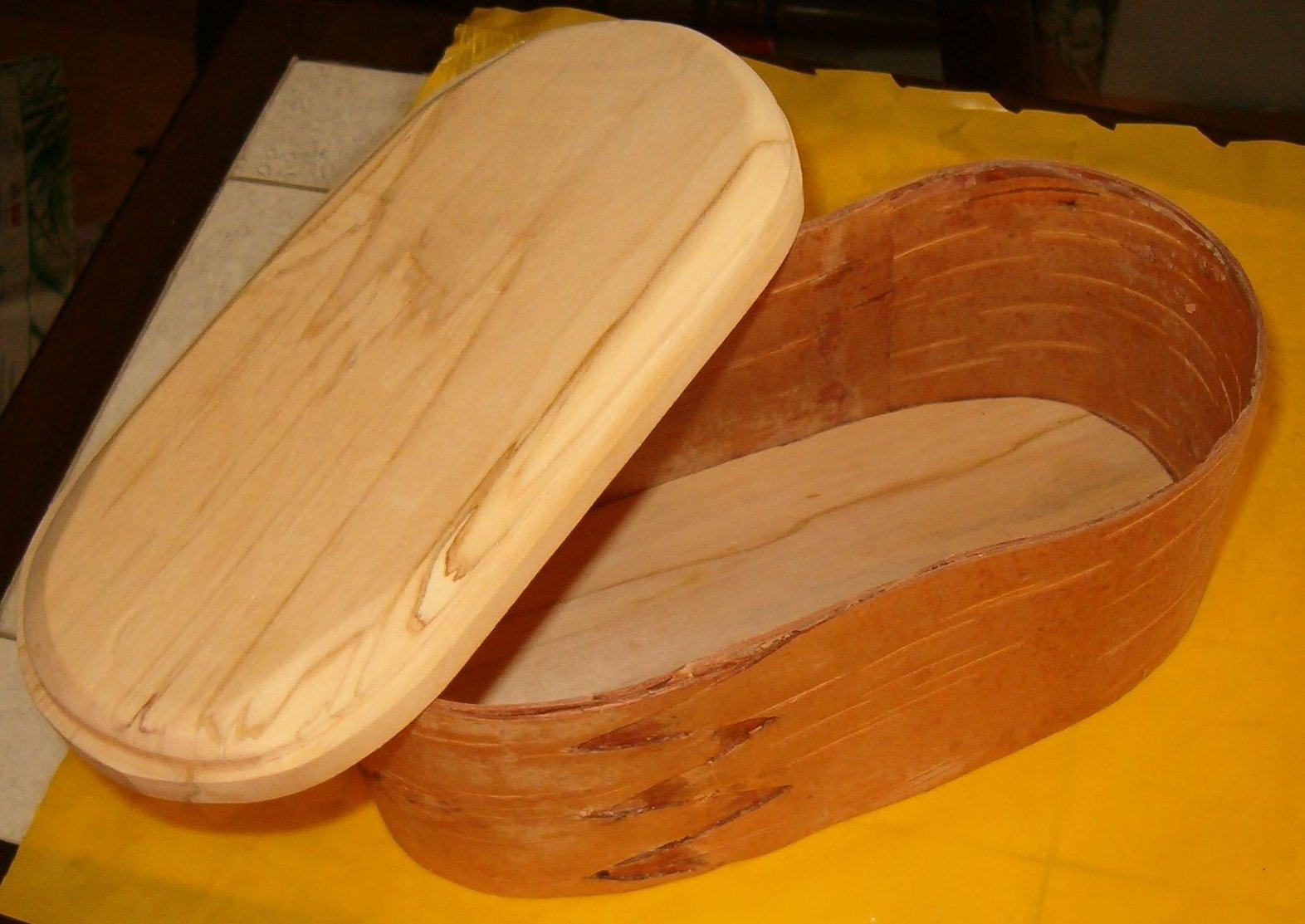
Birchbark box with lid and bottom of birch wood

Removing birch bark from live trees requires care. Removing the inner bark can be fatal to the tree. Preferably, it can be removed fairly easily from the trunk or branches of dead wood by cutting a slit lengthwise through the bark and pulling or prying it away from the wood. The best time for collection is spring or early summer, as the bark is of better quality and most easily removed.

Removing the outer (light) layer of bark from the trunk of a living tree may not kill it, but probably weakens it and makes it more prone to infections. Removal of the inner (dark) layer, the phloem, kills the tree by preventing the flow of sap to the roots.

== Uses ==
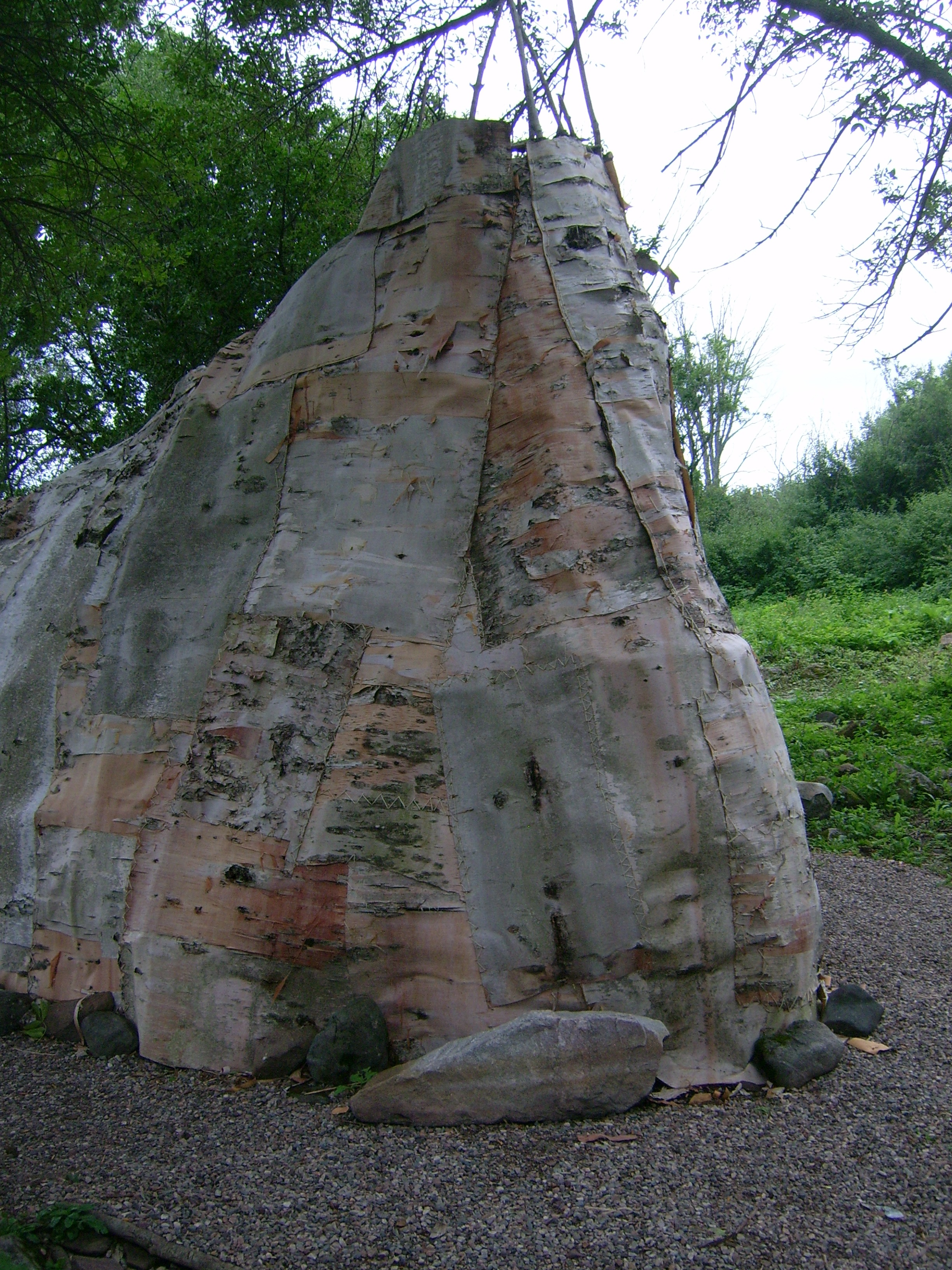
A birch bark longhouse on Whitefish Island in Canada

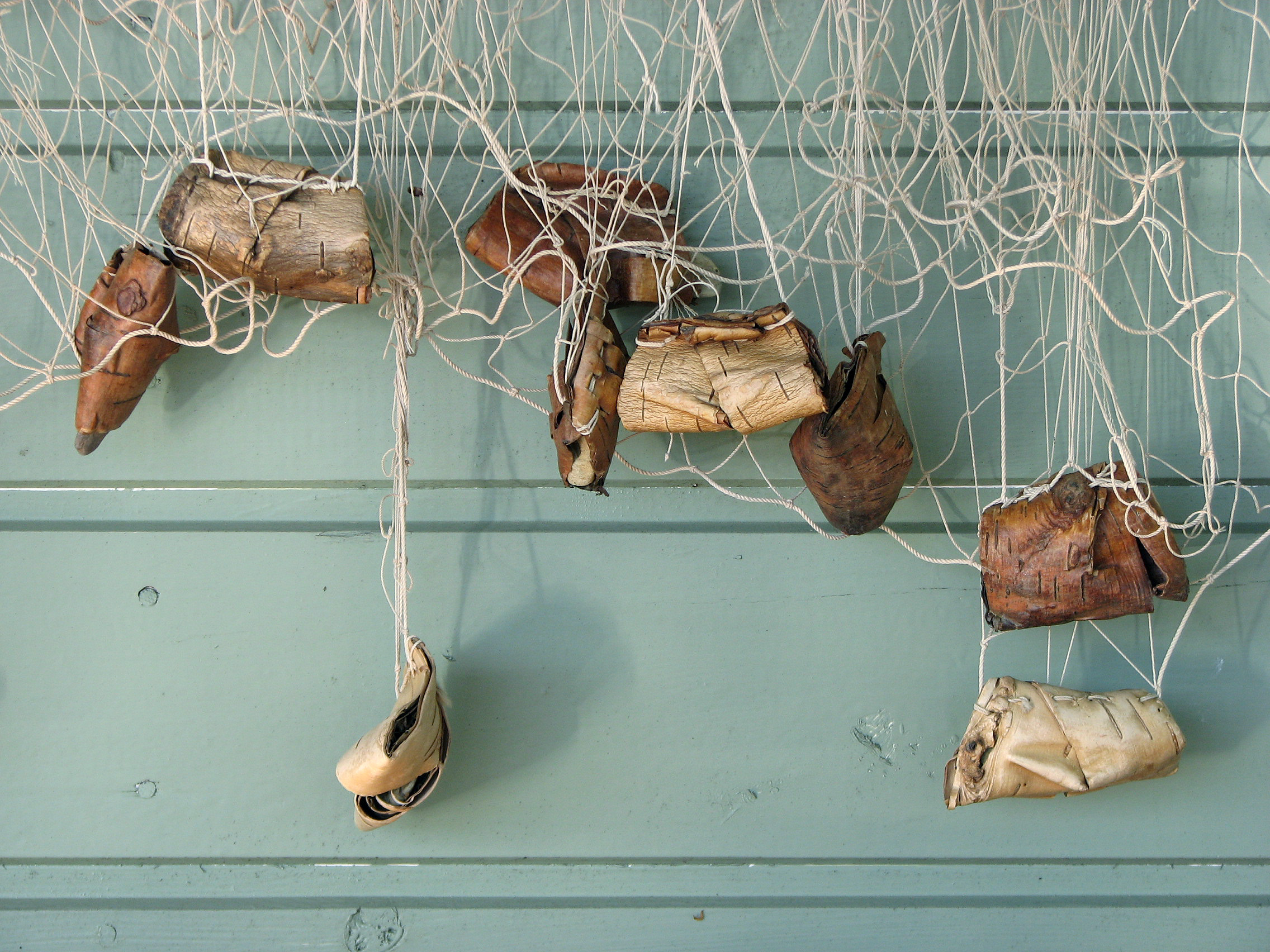
Finnish fishing net weights made out of birch bark and stones

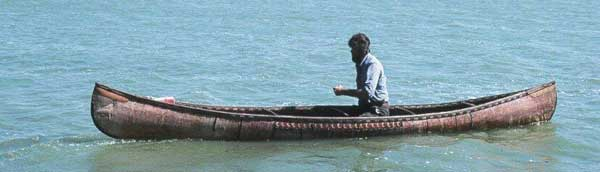
North American birchbark canoe

Birch bark can be used in a wide variety of applications, from writing to building and even to make clothing. It's a valuable construction material in any part of the world where birch trees were available. Containers such as wrappings, bags, baskets, boxes, or quivers were made by most societies well before pottery was invented. Other uses include:

- In various Asian countries (including Siberia) birch bark was used to make storage boxes, paper, tinder, canoes, roof coverings, tents, and waterproof covering for composite bows, such as the Mongol bow, the Chinese bow, Korean bow, Turkish bows, Assyrian bow, the Perso-Parthian bow. It is still being used. More than one variety of birch is used.
- In North America, the native population used birch bark for canoes, wigwams, scrolls, ritual art (birch bark biting), maps (including the oldest maps of North America), torches, fans, musical instruments, clothing, and more.
- In Scandinavia and Finland, it was used as the substratum of sod roofs and birch-bark roofs, for making boxes, casks and buckets, fishing implements, and shoes (as used by the Egtved Girl) similar to bast shoes.
- In Russia, many birch bark manuscripts have survived from the Middle Ages.
- In India, birch-bark, along with dried palm leaves, were the primary writing supports before the widespread advent of paper in the second millennium CE. The oldest known Buddhist manuscripts (some of the Gandharan Buddhist Texts), from Afghanistan, were written on birch bark.
- Neanderthals used birch bark to make a tar adhesive through the process of dry or destructive distillation.

Outer birch bark also makes an outstanding tinder, as it does not soak up water.

=== Medical uses ===
Filsuvez is a topical medication with birch bark extract as its active ingredient. It is used to treat two types of epidermolysis bullosa, dystrophic and junctional, targeting partial-thickness skin wounds. Common side effects include wound complications, skin reactions, infections, itching, and allergic reactions. Filsuvez was approved in the European Union in June 2022 and in the United States in December 2023. It is considered a first-in-class medication by the US Food and Drug Administration.

== See also ==
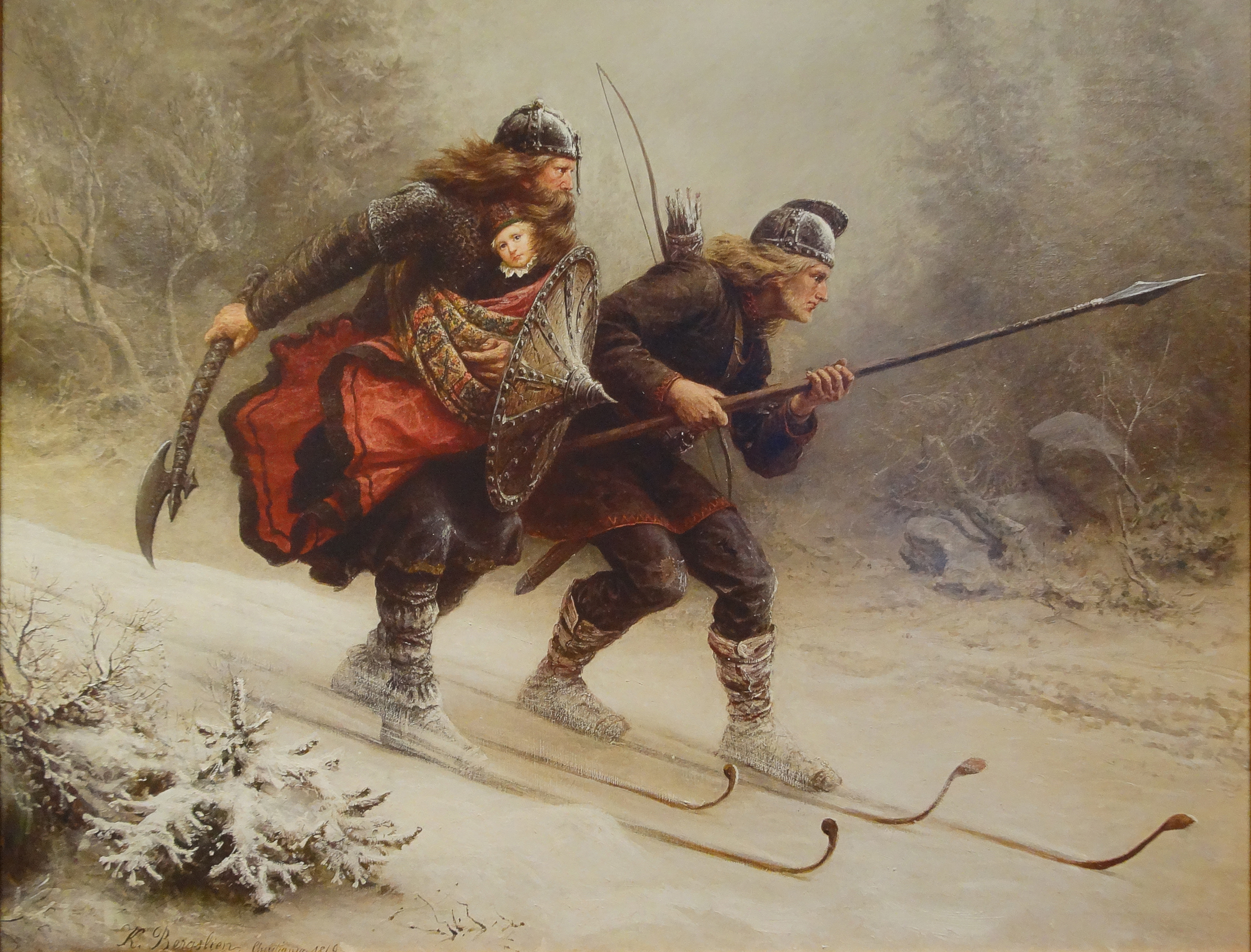
Birkebeiner wearing birch bark shoes and birch bark leg wraps

- Mazinibaganjigan – Indigenous Great Lakes art form
- Wiigwaasabak – Birch bark scrolls for ceremonial use by the Ojibwa (Anishinaabe) people of North America
- Wiigwaasi-makak – Box made from birch bark
- Magewappa – Japanese wood craft
- Lapti – Traditional bast fiber footwear of Europe
- Yukaghir birch-bark carvings – Carvings by a Siberian people for mapping, record-keeping and party games
