= Bolshevik (inhabited locality) =

Bolshevik (Russian: Большевик) is the name of several inhabited localities in Russia.

Urban localities

- Bolshevik, Magadan Oblast, an urban-type settlement in Susumansky District of Magadan Oblast

Rural localities

- Bolshevik, Altai Krai, a settlement in Pospelikhinsky Selsoviet of Pospelikhinsky District of Altai Krai
- Bolshevik, Bryansky District, Bryansk Oblast, a settlement in Chernetovsky Selsoviet of Bryansky District of Bryansk Oblast
- Bolshevik, Rognedinsky District, Bryansk Oblast, a settlement in Tyuninsky Selsoviet of Rognedinsky District of Bryansk Oblast
- Bolshevik, Chelyabinsk Oblast, a settlement in Novouralsky Selsoviet of Varnensky District of Chelyabinsk Oblast
- Bolshevik, Kaluga Oblast, a selo in Sukhinichsky District of Kaluga Oblast
- Bolshevik, Karachay-Cherkess Republic, a khutor in Urupsky District of the Karachay-Cherkess Republic
- Bolshevik, Kirov Oblast, a settlement in Bolshevistsky Rural Okrug of Sunsky District of Kirov Oblast
- Bolshevik, Novokubansky District, Krasnodar Krai, a khutor in Verkhnekubansky Rural Okrug of Novokubansky District of Krasnodar Krai
- Bolshevik, Tikhoretsky District, Krasnodar Krai, a settlement in Yugo-Severny Rural Okrug of Tikhoretsky District of Krasnodar Krai
- Bolshevik, Timashyovsky District, Krasnodar Krai, a khutor in Medvedovsky Rural Okrug of Timashyovsky District of Krasnodar Krai
- Bolshevik, Yeysky District, Krasnodar Krai, a settlement in Trudovoy Rural Okrug of Yeysky District of Krasnodar Krai
- Bolshevik, Republic of Mordovia, a settlement in Starosindrovsky Selsoviet of Krasnoslobodsky District of the Republic of Mordovia
- Bolshevik, Moscow Oblast, a settlement in Kalinovskoye Rural Settlement of Serpukhovsky District of Moscow Oblast
- Bolshevik, Nizhny Novgorod Oblast, a settlement in Novoslobodsky Selsoviet of Bolsheboldinsky District of Nizhny Novgorod Oblast
- Bolshevik, Orenburg Oblast, a selo in Uralsky Selsoviet of Kvarkensky District of Orenburg Oblast
- Bolshevik, Orlovsky District, Oryol Oblast, a settlement in Zhilyayevsky Selsoviet of Orlovsky District of Oryol Oblast
- Bolshevik, Uritsky District, Oryol Oblast, a settlement in Kotovsky Selsoviet of Uritsky District of Oryol Oblast
- Bolshevik, Azovsky District, Rostov Oblast, a khutor in Kalinovskoye Rural Settlement of Azovsky District of Rostov Oblast
- Bolshevik, Orlovsky District, Rostov Oblast, a khutor in Ostrovyanskoye Rural Settlement of Orlovsky District of Rostov Oblast
- Bolshevik, Blagodarnensky District, Stavropol Krai, a khutor in Blagodarnensky District, Stavropol Krai
- Bolshevik, Ipatovsky District, Stavropol Krai, a settlement in Bolshevistsky Selsoviet of Ipatovsky District of Stavropol Krai
- Bolshevik, Vladimir Oblast, a settlement in Kolchuginsky District of Vladimir Oblast
- Bolshevik, Alexeyevsky District, Volgograd Oblast, a khutor in Krasnooktyabrsky Selsoviet of Alexeyevsky District of Volgograd Oblast
- Bolshevik, Yelansky District, Volgograd Oblast, a settlement in Bolshevistsky Selsoviet of Yelansky District of Volgograd Oblast
- Bolshevik, Voronezh Oblast, a settlement under the administrative jurisdiction of Novokhopyorsk Urban Settlement in Novokhopyorsky District of Voronezh Oblast
- Bolshevik, Zabaykalsky Krai, a selo in Ononsky District of Zabaykalsky Krai

== See also ==
- Balshavik, places in Belarus named Bolshevik in Russian
