= Urta-Khargana =

Urta-Khargana Урта-Харгана
- Selo
- Location within Zabaykalsky Krai Location within Russia
- Coordinates: 50°23′N 114°45′E
- Country: Russia
- Region: Zabaykalsky Krai
- District: Ononsky District
- Time zone: UTC+9:00

Urta-Khargana (Russian: Урта-Харгана) is a rural locality (a selo) in Ononsky District, Zabaykalsky Krai, Russia. Population: 51 (2021 census); 62 (2010 census); There are 2 streets in this selo.

== Geography ==
This rural locality is located 29 km from Nizhny Tsasuchey (the district's administrative centre), 203 km from Chita (capital of Zabaykalsky Krai) and 5,501 km from Moscow. Kubukhay is the nearest rural locality.
