= Kadykchan =

Kadykchan Кадыкчан
- Work settlement
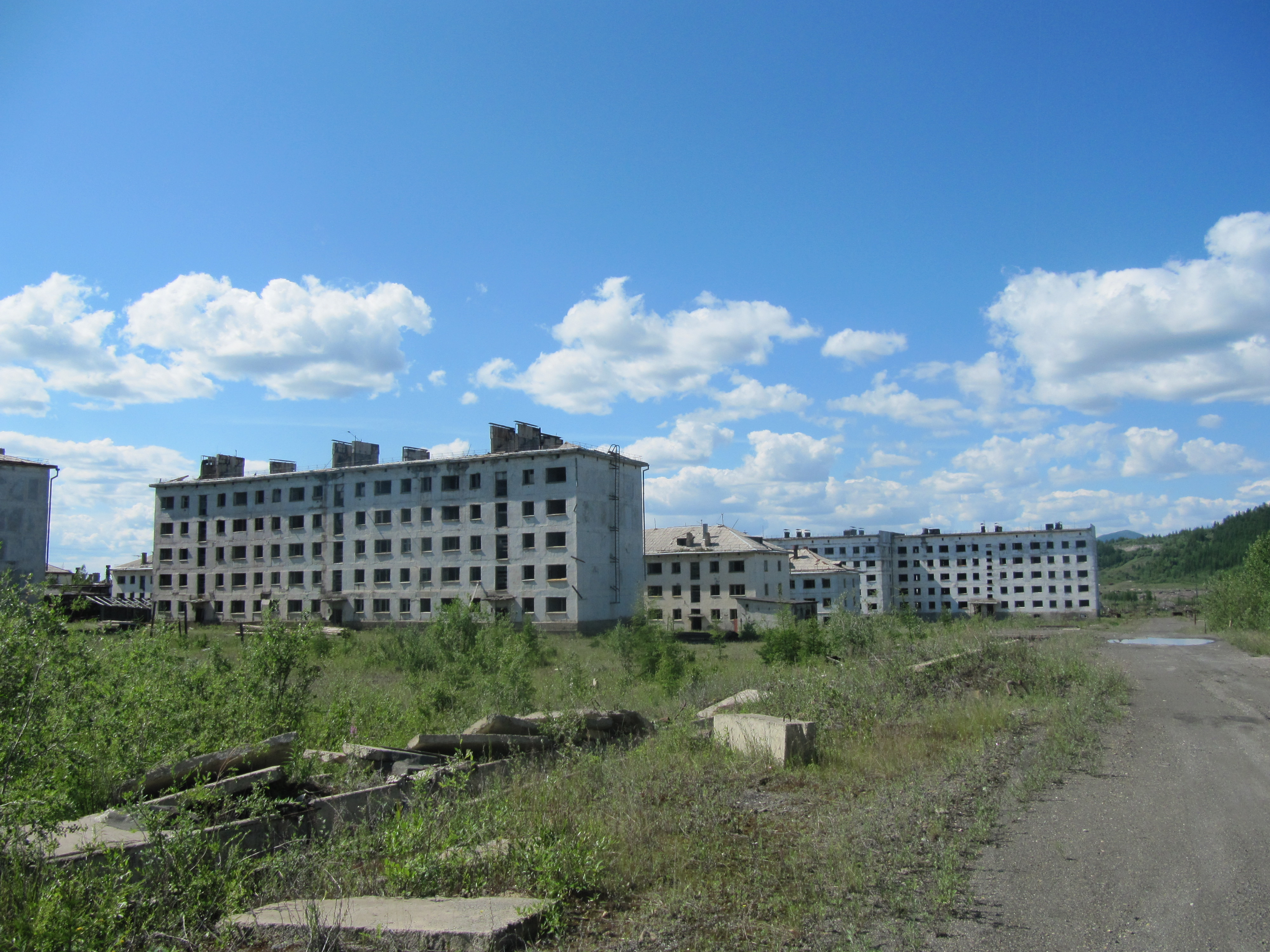
- Abandoned apartment buildings in Kadykchan, 2011
- Interactive map of Kadykchan
- Location of Kadykchan Kadykchan (Magadan Oblast) Kadykchan (Asia)
- Coordinates: 63°05′N 147°03′E
- Country: Russia
- Federal subject: Magadan Oblast
- Administrative district: Susumansky District
- Founded: 1940s

Population
  - Estimate (2023): 0 )
- Time zone: UTC+11 (MSK+8)
- Postal code: 686350
- OKTMO ID: 44713000076

Kadykchan (Russian: Кадыкча́н; Even: Кадагчан) is a depopulated urban locality (a work settlement) in Susumansky District of Magadan Oblast, Russia. It is located in the Upper Kolyma Highlands, in the basin of the Ayan-Yuryakh River, 65 kilometers (40 mi) northwest of Susuman, the administrative center of the district. As of the 2010 Census, it had no recorded population.

== Etymology ==
The settlement's name comes from the indigenous Even language word meaning "small gorge" or "ravine".

== History ==
Kadykchan was built by gulag prisoners during World War II for the purposes of coal extraction. Later it accommodated miners at two local coal mines which supplied Arkagalinskaya electric power station. The depth of mines was about 400 meters (1,300 ft).

After the dissolution of the Soviet Union, coal mining in the area became increasingly unprofitable. One mine closed in 1992, and an explosion at the other in 1996 which killed six people led to a decision to close it also and for the government to subsidize residents to move elsewhere. Major buildings were blown up. As of 2010, the settlement was officially completely depopulated.

== Population history ==
1970	1979	1986	1989	2002	2007	2010	2023
3,378	4,764	10,270	5,794	875	227	0	0
