= Ust-Liska =

Ust-Liska Усть-Лиска
- Selo
- Location within Zabaykalsky Krai Location within Russia
- Coordinates: 50°25′N 114°34′E
- Country: Russia
- Region: Zabaykalsky Krai
- District: Ononsky District
- Time zone: UTC+9:00

Ust-Liska (Russian: Усть-Лиска) is a rural locality (a selo) in Ononsky District, Zabaykalsky Krai, Russia. Population: 83 (2021 census); 110 (2010 census); There are 2 streets in this selo.

== Geography ==
This rural locality is located 40 km from Nizhny Tsasuchey (the district's administrative centre), 194 km from Chita (capital of Zabaykalsky Krai) and 5,484 km from Moscow. Bolsehvik is the nearest rural locality.
