= Kholodny (inhabited locality) =

Kholodny (Russian: Холо́дный; masculine), Kholodnaya (Холо́дная; feminine), or Kholodnoye (Холо́дное; neuter) is the name of several inhabited localities in Russia.

Urban localities

- Kholodny, Magadan Oblast, an urban-type settlement in Susumansky District of Magadan Oblast

Rural localities

- Kholodny, Rostov Oblast, a khutor in Ryabichevskoye Rural Settlement of Volgodonskoy District in Rostov Oblast
- Kholodnoye, Korochansky District, Belgorod Oblast, a khutor in Korochansky District of Belgorod Oblast
- Kholodnoye, Prokhorovsky District, Belgorod Oblast, a selo in Prokhorovsky District of Belgorod Oblast
- Kholodnoye, Novosibirsk Oblast, a village in Suzunsky District of Novosibirsk Oblast
- Kholodnaya (rural locality), a settlement in Kindigirsky evenkiysky Selsoviet of Severo-Baykalsky District in the Republic of Buryatia
