= Susuman (disambiguation) =

Susuman is a town in Susumansky District of Magadan Oblast, Russia.

Susuman may also refer to:

- Susuman Urban Settlement, a municipal formation which the town of Susuman in Susumansky District of Magadan Oblast, Russia is incorporated as
- Susuman Airport, an airport in Magadan Oblast, Russia
- Susuman River, a river in Magadan Oblast, Russia
