= Kulusutay =

Kulusutay Кулусутай
- Selo
- Location within Zabaykalsky Krai Location within Russia
- Coordinates: 50°14′N 115°41′E
- Country: Russia
- Region: Zabaykalsky Krai
- District: Ononsky District
- Time zone: UTC+9:00

Kulusutay (Russian: Кулусутай) is a rural locality (a selo) in Ononsky District, Zabaykalsky Krai, Russia. Population: 555 (2021 census); 689 (2010 census); 924 (2002 census); There are 10 streets in this selo.

== Geography ==
This rural locality is located 50 km from Nizhny Tsasuchey (the district's administrative centre), 253 km from Chita (capital of Zabaykalsky Krai) and 5,586 km from Moscow. Novaya Zarya is the nearest rural locality.
