= Ikaral =

Ikaral Икарал
- Selo
- Location within Zabaykalsky Krai Location within Russia
- Coordinates: 50°32′N 115°17′E
- Country: Russia
- Region: Zabaykalsky Krai
- District: Ononsky District
- Time zone: UTC+9:00

Ikaral (Russian: Икарал) is a rural locality (a selo) in Ononsky District, Zabaykalsky Krai, Russia. Population: 141 (2021 census); 157 (2010 census); 183 (2002 census); There is 1 street in this selo.

== Geography ==
This rural locality is located 12 km from Nizhny Tsasuchey (the district's administrative centre), 209 km from Chita (capital of Zabaykalsky Krai) and 5,520 km from Moscow. Chindant 1-y is the nearest rural locality.
