= Kuranzha =

Kuranzha Куранжа
- Selo
- Location within Zabaykalsky Krai Location within Russia
- Coordinates: 50°26′N 114°02′E
- Country: Russia
- Region: Zabaykalsky Krai
- District: Ononsky District
- Time zone: UTC+9:00

Kuranzha (Russian: Куранжа) is a rural locality (a selo) in Ononsky District, Zabaykalsky Krai, Russia. Population: 116 (2021 census); 138 (2010 census); 176 (2002 census); There is 1 street in this selo.

== Geography ==
This rural locality is located 77 km from Nizhny Tsasuchey (the district's administrative centre), 181 km from Chita (capital of Zabaykalsky Krai) and 5,444 km from Moscow. Tut-Khaltuy is the nearest rural locality.
