= Bolshevik (disambiguation) =

Bolsheviks were a faction of the Russian Social-Democratic Labor Party which eventually took power in Russia.

Bolshevik or Bolsheviks may also refer to:

== Places ==
- Balshavik, several inhabited localities in Belarus called 'Bolshevik' in Russian
- Bolshevik (inhabited locality), several inhabited localities in Russia
- Bolshevik Island, the southernmost island of the Severnaya Zemlya group
- Bolshevik, former name of St. Anastasia Island in the Black Sea

== Other ==
- Bolshevik (journal), monthly theoretical magazine of the Communist Party of the Soviet Union
- Bolshevik Factory, name of the Obukhov State Plant between 1922 and 1992
- The Bolsheviks, a professional wrestling tag team
