= Kholodny =

Kholodny (masculine), Kholodnaya/Kholodna (feminine), or Kholodnoye/Kholodne (neuter) may refer to:

- Kholodny (surname)
- Kholodny (inhabited locality) (Kholodnaya, Kholodnoye), several inhabited localities in Russia
- Kholodnaya River (Tatarstan), a river in Tatarstan, Russia; a tributary of Menzelya River
- Kholodne, Donetsk Raion, Donetsk Oblast, Ukraine

== See also ==
- Kolodny, a surname
