= Kolodny =

Kolodny, also spelled Kolodney and Kolodnyi, is a surname. Notable people with the surname include:

- Annette Kolodny (1941–2019), American literary critic and activist
- Avinoam Kolodny (fl. 1970s–2020s), Israeli professor
- Daniella Kolodny (fl. 2000s–2020s), Israeli rabbi
- Debra Kolodny (fl. 1980s–2020s), American activist
- Lauren Kolodny (fl. 2010s–2020s), American entrepreneur and venture capitalist
- Moshe Kol (1911–1989), Israeli politician and activist, born Moshe Kolodny
- Robert C. Kolodny (born 1944), American author
- Robert Kolodny (filmmaker) (fl. 2010s–2020s), American film maker
- William Kolodney (1899–1976), American cultural educator

== Fictional characters ==
- Corporal Kolodny, a character in Catch-22
- Rose Kolodny, a character in the writings of William Gibson
- The Kolodny Brothers, characters mentioned (not seen) in the film The Adventures of Buckaroo Bonzai

== See also ==
- Kholodny (disambiguation)
