= Ust-Borzya =

Ust-Borzya Усть-Борзя
- Selo
- Location within Zabaykalsky Krai Location within Russia
- Coordinates: 50°36′N 115°40′E
- Country: Russia
- Region: Zabaykalsky Krai
- District: Ononsky District
- Time zone: UTC+9:00

Ust-Borzya (Russian: Усть-Борзя) is a rural locality (a selo) in Ononsky District, Zabaykalsky Krai, Russia. Population: 224 (2021 census); 338 (2010 census); There are 9 streets in this selo.

== Geography ==
This rural locality is located 41 km from Nizhny Tsasuchey (the district's administrative centre), 221 km from Chita (capital of Zabaykalsky Krai) and 5,539 km from Moscow. Stary Chindant is the nearest rural locality.
