= Kubukhay =

Kubukhay Кубухай
- Selo
- Location within Zabaykalsky Krai Location within Russia
- Coordinates: 50°29′N 114°49′E
- Country: Russia
- Region: Zabaykalsky Krai
- District: Ononsky District
- Time zone: UTC+9:00

Kubukhay (Russian: Кубухай) is a rural locality (a selo) in Ononsky District, Zabaykalsky Krai, Russia. Population: 320 (2021 census); 452 (2010 census); 577 (2002 census); There are 6 streets in this selo.

== Geography ==
This rural locality is located 22 km from Nizhny Tsasuchey (the district's administrative centre), 195 km from Chita (capital of Zabaykalsky Krai) and 5,492 km from Moscow. Budulan is the nearest rural locality.
