= Buylesan =

Buylesan Буйлэсан
- Selo
- Location within Zabaykalsky Krai Location within Russia
- Coordinates: 50°14′N 114°52′E
- Country: Russia
- Region: Zabaykalsky Krai
- District: Ononsky District
- Time zone: UTC+9:00

Buylesan (Russian: Буйлэсан) is a rural locality (a selo) in Ononsky District, Zabaykalsky Krai, Russia. Population: 390 (2021 census); 472 (2010 census); 647 (2002 census); There are 4 streets in this selo.

== Geography ==
This rural locality is located 34 km from Nizhny Tsasuchey (the district's administrative centre), 222 km from Chita (capital of Zabaykalsky Krai) and 5,528 km from Moscow. Arshantuy is the nearest rural locality.
