= Kholodny (surname) =

Kholodny or Cholodny (feminine: Kholodna, Cholodna, Kholodnaya) is a surname. It comes from East Slavic descendants of Proto-Slavic *xoldьnъ ("cool", "cold"). Notable people with the surname include:

- Natalia Liwycka-Chołodna (1902–2005), Ukrainian poet
- Nikolai Cholodny (1882–1953), Soviet microbiologist
- Vera Kholodnaya (1893–1919), Ukrainian-Russian actress
- Petro Cholodny, The Younger (1902–1990), artist and iconographer
