= Galician school (architecture) =

Medieval architectural style

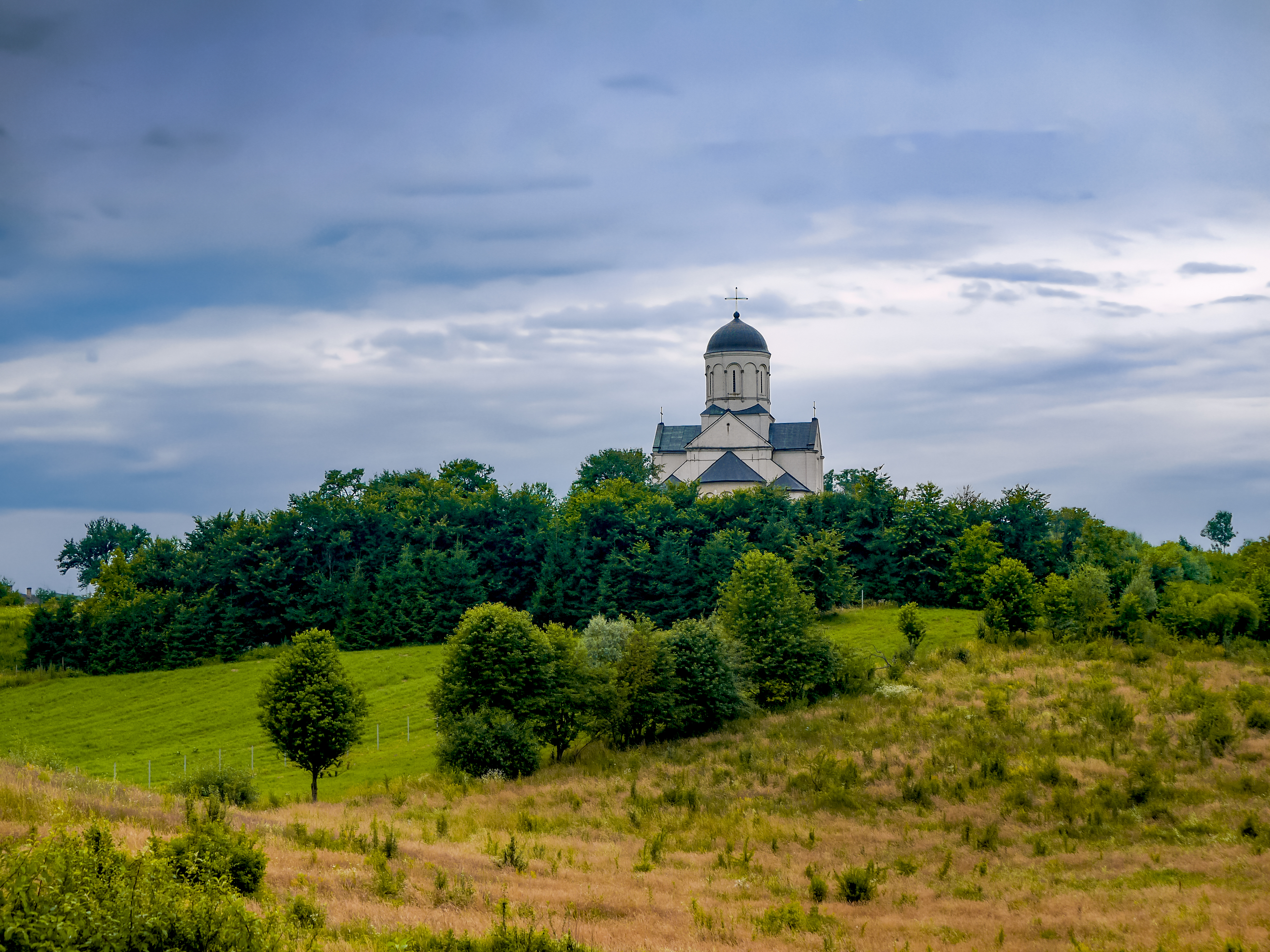
View of the Church of St. Pantaleon in Shevchenkove (near Halych), the only surviving example of the Galician school of architecture

Galician school is a style of Romanesque and Byzantine architecture that developed on the territory of upper Dniester river, during the reign of House of Rostyslaw. It was the main style of monumental, especially sacral, architecture in the Principality of Galicia. The characteristic feature of the style is the use of Romanesque masonry technique of cut white stone blocks to create cross-domed churches of Byzantine type. It is believed that the builders of the Galician school built the first stone churches of the colonized Zalesye, which gave rise to some features of architecture of Rostov-Suzdal Land.

== Definition and research ==
Due to the almost complete loss of the monuments of the Galician school, their research and description were based primarily on archaeological research. First artifacts were discovered in 1881–1885 by Lev Lavretskyi, the parish priest of Halych, who also involved Izydor Szaraniewicz. Architectural analysis and stylistic interpretation of the data were performed by Julian Zachariewicz. The main contribution to the description of the Galician school was done by Yosyp Pelenskyi, who drew attention to the following features: separation of apses in the plan into identical ground parts; the foundations being built from river stone on mortar, while the ground walls being built from cut blocks; and the wide usage of the lime-sand mixture. The plans and descriptions of the monuments of Princely Halych, presented by Pelenskyi in his monograph, have been the main source of analysis of architectural and archaeological monuments of the Principality of Galicia and retain their relevance. During the 20th century, knowledge about the Galician school was significantly expanded by new archaeological discoveries, in particular of the Dormition Cathedral, the main church of Princely Halych. Also the foundation of the Church of John the Baptist in Przemyśl, the first church of the Galician school, and remains of church foundations in Zvenyhorod were found. Further studies continue in independent Ukraine with the use of more advanced methods of archaeological research. In 1998, the Church of Pantaleon, the only surviving monument of the Galician school, was restored.

== Origin ==
The emergence of the Galician school of architecture was the subject of many hypotheses and assumptions, which are presented in a significant number of scientific works. Proponents of the Hungarian hypothesis point to the geographic proximity and close political connection of Galicia and the Kingdom of Hungary, and the rapid development of Romanesque architecture in the latter due to French influence. In particular, Mikhail Karger pointed out the similarities of the usage of stained glass windows, the holy water font, and features of decoration. The Lesser Poland hypothesis put forward by O. Iaonnisyan connects the Galician school with a number of objects in Kraków Land, even though the churches in Lesser Poland were built after the ones in Galicia. The Transcaucasian hypothesis proposed by Ivan Mohytych connects the white stone architecture of Galicia with the influences of Armenian traditions of sacral architecture. The organic conception hypothesis suggests considering the Galician school as a part of the pan-European process of the development of Romanesque architecture, when similar styles arose contemporarily throughout the continent.

== List of notable examples ==
* Surviving
^ Partially surviving
Not surviving

Name	Location	Year built	Description	Image
Cathedral of John the Baptist	Przemyśl	1119–1126	Dismantled in 15th century for the material of the Latin Catholic Cathedral. Underwent archaeological research in 1959–1964.	
Rotunda of St. Nicholas	Przemyśl	11th–12th centuries	Dismantled in 15th century when the Catholic Cathedral was built in its place.	
Princely chambers	Przemyśl	c. 12th century	An earlier chapel-rotunda adjoined the palace building. Entirely ruined in early 17th century.	
Unnamed church	Zvenyhorod	before 1144	Ruined in 13th century.	
Princely chambers	Zvenyhorod	before 1144	Ruined in 13th century. Underwent archaeological research in 1965–1968 by A. A. Ratych.	
Church of the Saviour	Halych	1152	Lost in 1627. According to the excavation data (in 1880s by L. Lavretskyi and I. Sharanevych, and in 1980–1981 by O. M. Ioannesyan) it was a white stone four-pillar three-apsed church.	
Dormition Cathedral	Halych	1140s–1150s	Lost in 14th–16th centuries. According to excavations, it was a majestic white stone four-column three-apsed church, and the second-largest sacral building of Kievan Rus'.	
Church of Cyril and Methodius	Halych	12th to early 13th century	Completely ruined. Underwent archaeological research in 1880s by L. Lavretskyi and I. Sharanevych. It was a white stone three-apsed four-pillar church.	
Church of Saint Pantaleon *	Halych	ca. 1200	Originally a white stone four-pillar three-apsed church. The entire upper part, the vault, and the bathhouse were destroyed when it was rebuilt into a Catholic church in 1611. Restored to its original form in 1998.	
Church of Boris and Gleb in Poberezhzhia tract	Yezupil	12th century	Completely ruined. Underwent archaeological research in 1935 by Yaroslav Pasternak and in 1959 by Mikhail Karger. It was a white stone church in the shape of a quadrifolium.	
Church of Saint Anna (?) in Tsvyntaryska tract	Halych	Late 12th to early 13th century	Completely ruined. Underwent archaeological research in 1880s by L. Lavretskyi and I. Sharanevych. It was a white stone four-pillar church, likely with, three apses.	
Church of Annunciation	Halych	Late 12th to early 13th century	Lost after 1458. Underwent archaeological research in 1884 by L. Lavretskyi and I. Sharanevych. It was a pillarless church with an elongated two-chambered altar.	
Church of Elijah the Prophet	Halych	Late 12th to early 13th century	Dismantled in early 19th century. Remains were studied by Mikhail Karger in 1955. It was a small one-apsed rotunda with a vestibule.	
Church of St. Ivan (?) in Tsarynka tract	Halych	Early 13th century	Completely ruined. Remains found by Y. Lukomskyi in 1990–1992.	
"Polygon" Church	Halych	Middle to late 12th century	Completely ruined. According to excavation data (in 1880s by L. Lavretskyi and I. Sharanevych, and in 1979 by O. M. Ioannesyan) it was a white stone church in the shape of a quadrifolium, 8-sided in the plan.	
Unnamed church (possibly of Vasyl the Great)	Vasyliv	12th–13th centuries	Ruined in 17th century. Rediscovered in 1958–1959 by B. A. Tymoshchuk and H. N. Lohvyn). It was a white stone four-pillar later extensions.	
Church of St. Peter	Przemyśl	12th to early 13th century	Ruined in 14th century. A wooden Catholic church was built in its place, but it was dismantled in 17th century.	
Church of St. Nicholas ^	Lviv	second half of 13th century	Rebuilt in late medieval period. Small parts of original walls remain.	

== See also ==
- Silesian architecture
