= Upper Kolyma Highlands =

Highland area in Magadan Oblast, Russia

- Верхнеколымское нагорье
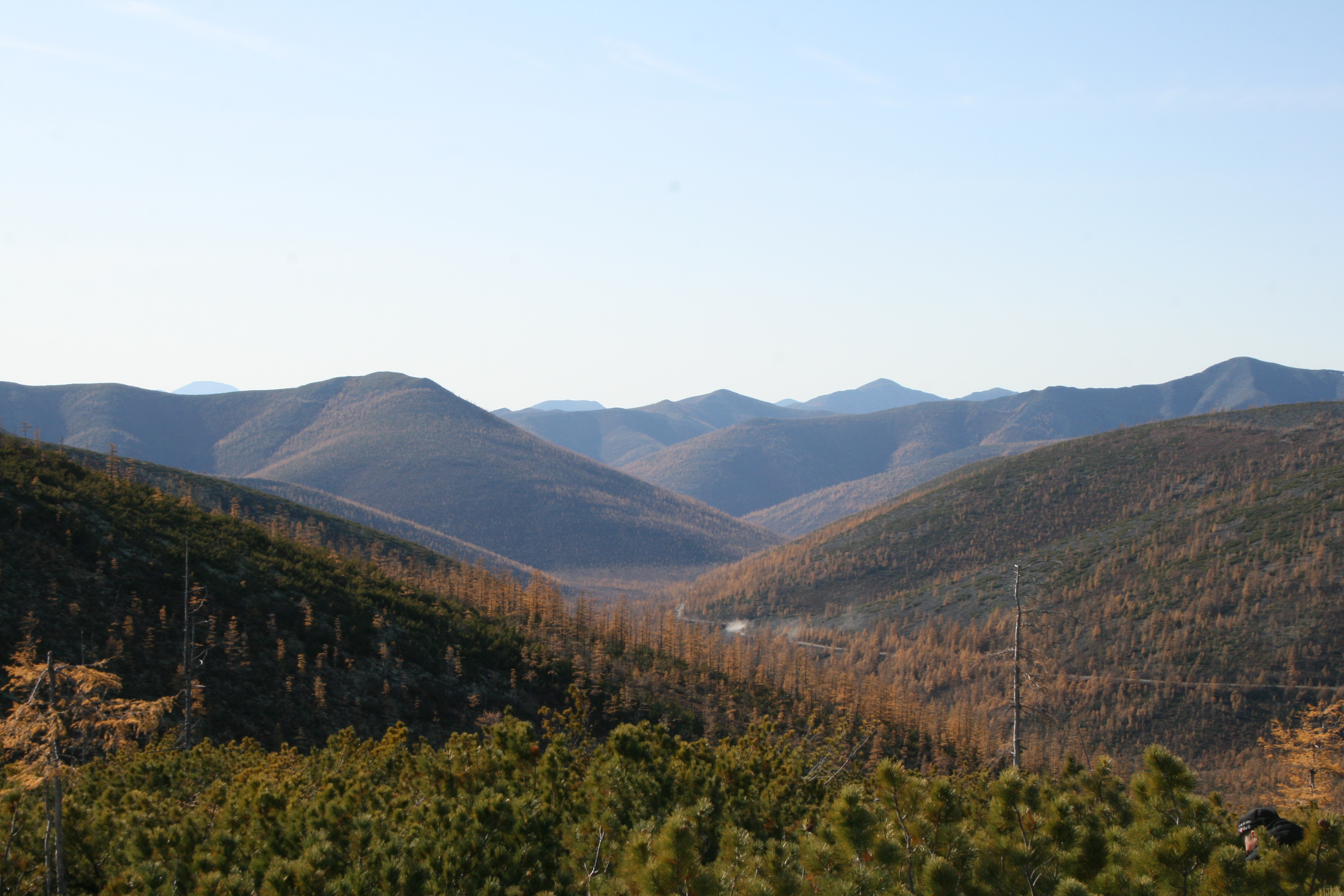
- View of sparse larch forest in the highlands

Highest point
- Peak: Gora Snezhnaya
- Elevation: 2,293 m (7,523 ft)
- Coordinates: 61°59′01″N 149°19′54″E

Geography
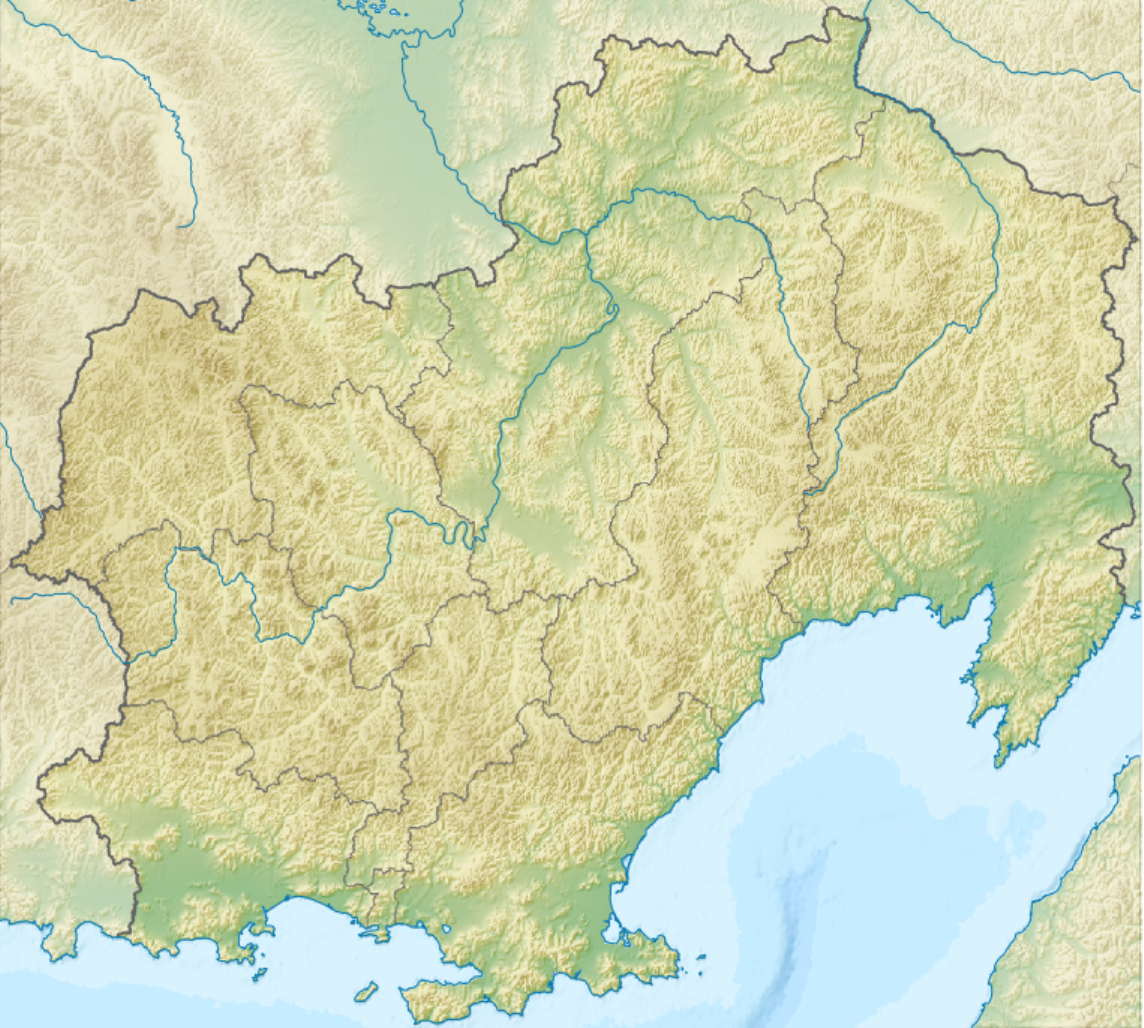
- Location within Magadan Oblast
- Country: Russia
- Federal subject: Magadan Oblast
- Range coordinates: 62°55′N 146°50′E
- Parent range: East Siberian System

Geology
- Rock age(s): Permian and Triassic
- Rock type(s): Sandstone, shale and granite intrusions

The Upper Kolyma Highlands (Russian: Верхнеколымское нагорье, romanized: Verkhnekolymskoye Nagorye) is a highland area in Magadan Oblast, Far Eastern Federal District, Russia. The biggest town in the highlands is Susuman.

There are large deposits of gold, tin and rare metals in the Upper Kolyma Highlands. The area is relatively less desolate than other mountainous zones of Northeastern Siberia, such as the Yukaghir Highlands or the Nera Plateau. However, some of the mining operations were deemed unprofitable following the collapse of the USSR and certain settlements of the Susumansky District lost population. Only a residual population remains in Shiroky, Kholodny and Bolshevik. Other places such as Belichan and Kadykchan have become ghost towns.

The R504 Kolyma Highway crosses the southern part of the highlands.

== Geography ==
The Upper Kolyma Highlands are located in the upper course of the Kolyma. They are bound in the west by the Tas-Kystabyt and Suntar-Khayata ranges and to the east by the Seymchan-Buyunda Depression to the north and the Ola river basin to the south, with the Maymandzhin Range stretching in between. To the northwest lies the Nera Plateau and in the north the highlands merge with the southernmost chains of the Chersky Range. The Seimkan Mountains and the Igandzha Massif rise to the south, among other minor ranges.

The ranges are generally smooth, although some ridges display alpine characteristics. The higher elevations of the ridges are between 1,300 metres (4,300 ft) and 2,000 metres (6,600 ft). The highest point is 2,293 metres (7,523 ft) high Gora Snezhnaya. Another important summit is 2,286 metres (7,500 ft) high Pik Aborigen, both in the Angachak Range.

The main rivers in the highlands are part of the upper basin of the Kolyma River, including rivers Ayan-Yuryakh and Kulu, as well as the Buyunda, Bakhapcha —with the Maltan, Byoryolyokh and Tenka, among others. There are mineral water springs.

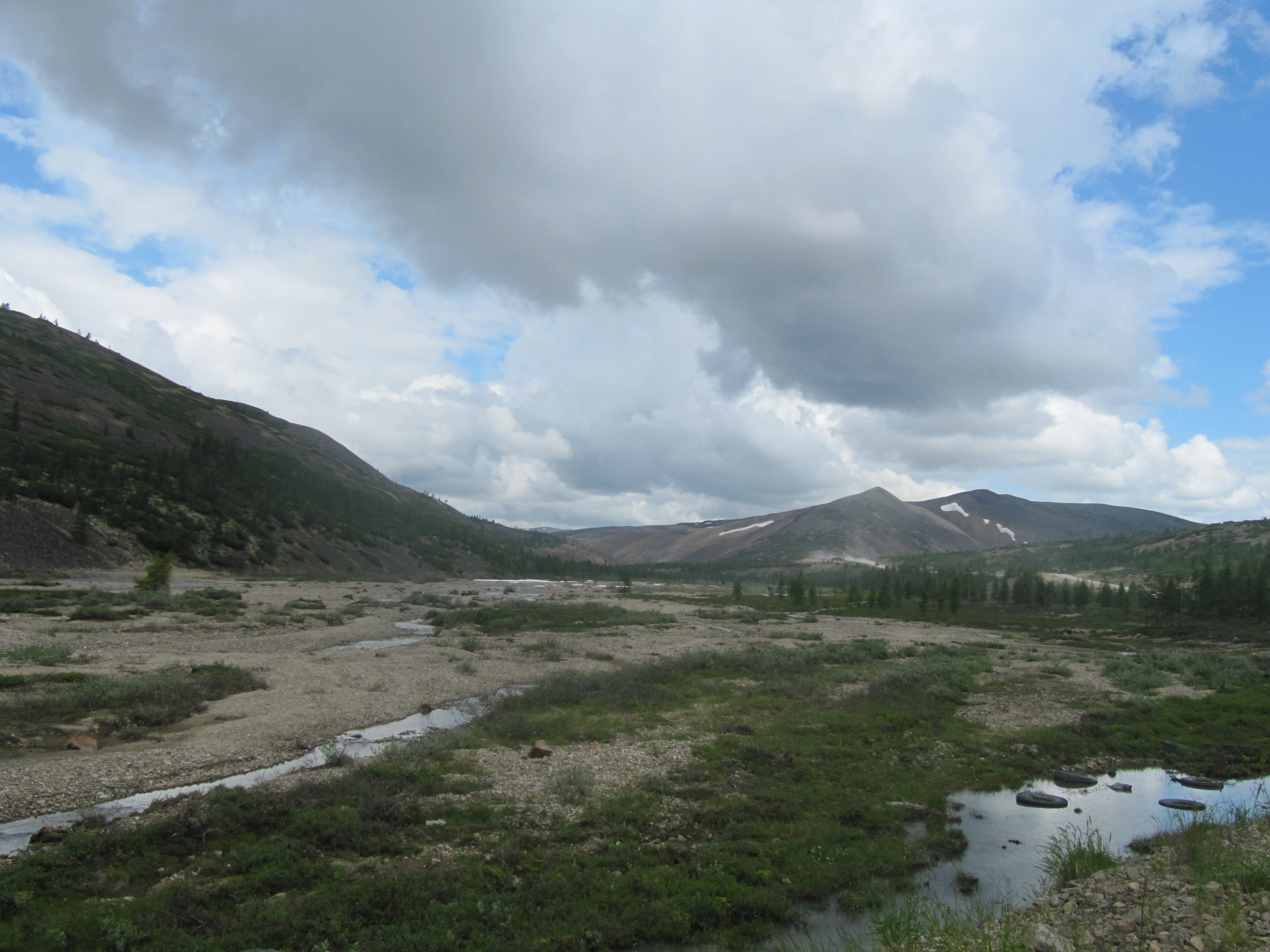
Southern end of the highland area by the Kolyma Highway.

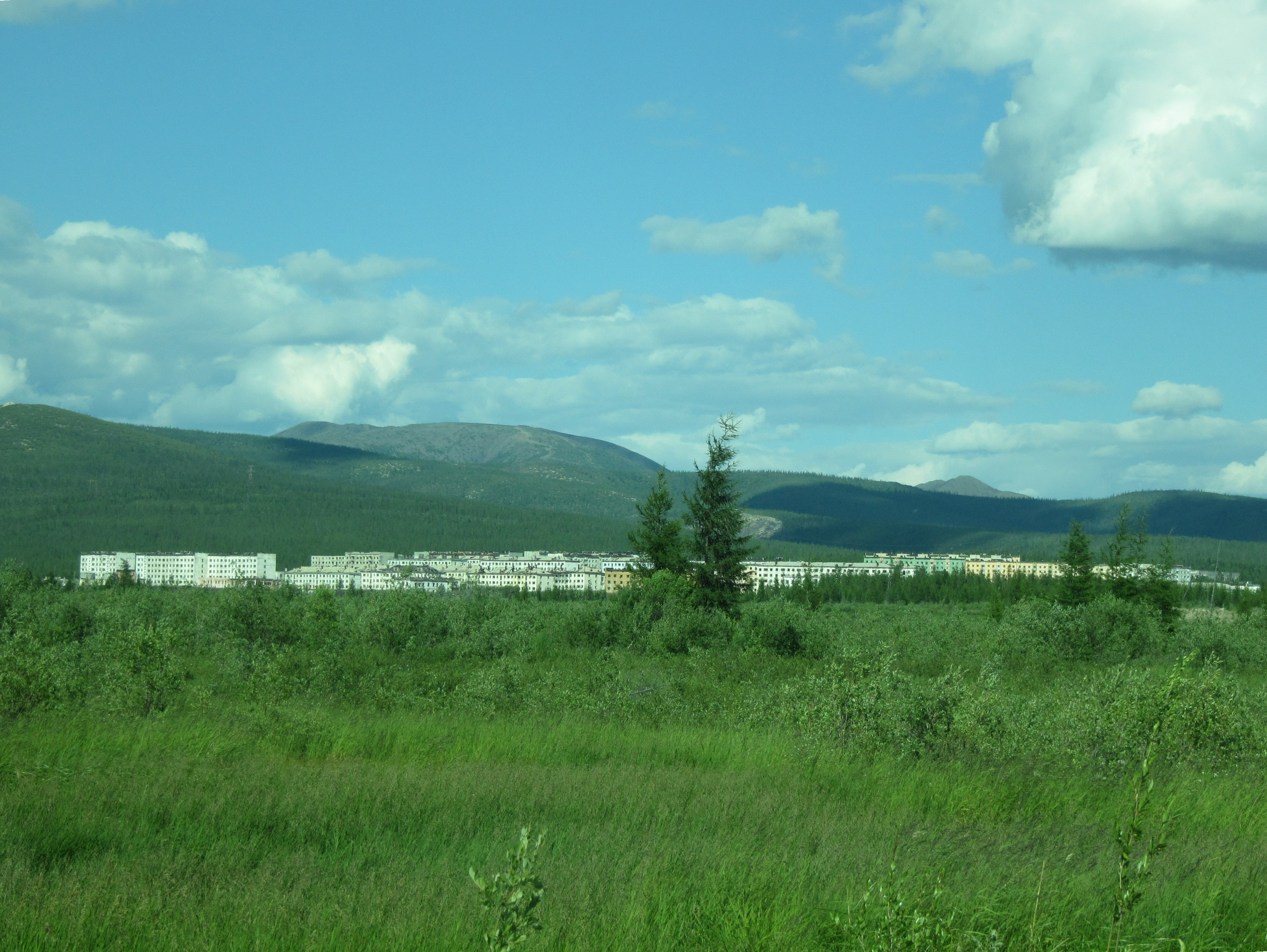
Kadykchan, the abandoned settlement which had a population reaching 10,000 souls in its heyday.

== Flora ==
The valleys of the rivers and their slopes are overgrown with sparse forests of Siberian larch and dwarf cedar. At higher elevations there is mountain tundra up to heights of 1,200 metres (3,900 ft) to 1,800 metres (5,900 ft).

== See also ==
- Kolyma (greater region)
- List of mountains and hills of Russia
