= Belichan =

Belichan Беличан
- Urban-type settlement
- Interactive map of Belichan
- Location of Belichan Belichan (Magadan Oblast)
- Coordinates: 62.8902°N 148.1432°E
- Country: Russia
- Federal subject: Magadan Oblast
- Administrative district: Susumansky District
- Founded: 1950

Population (2010 Census)
  - Total: 0
  - Estimate (2023): 0 )
- Time zone: UTC+11 (MSK+8)
- Postal code: 686320
- OKTMO ID: 44713000066

Belichan (Russian: Беличан) is an urban locality (an urban-type settlement) in Susumansky District of Magadan Oblast, Russia. Population: 0 (2010 census); 32 (2002 census); 1,285 (1989 Soviet census).

== Geography ==
Belichan is located in the Upper Kolyma Highlands by the Byoryolyokh river.
