= Shiroky, Magadan Oblast =

Široky Широкий
- Settlement
- Location within Magadan Oblast Location within Russia
- Coordinates: 63°04′44″N 148°02′09″E
- Country: Russia
- Region: Magadan Oblast
- District: Susumansky District
- Time zone: UTC+11:00

Široky (Russian: Широкий) is a rural locality (a settlement, formerly urban-type settlement from 1957 to 2013) in Susumansky District of Magadan Oblast, Russia. Population: 80 (2010 census); 585 (2002 census); 1,946 (1989 Soviet census).

== Geography ==
Shiroky is located in the Upper Kolyma Highlands by the Byoryolyokh river.
