= Bolshevik, Zabaykalsky Krai =

Selo in Zabaykalsky Krai, Russia

Bolshevik Большевик
- Selo
- Location within Zabaykalsky Krai Location within Russia
- Coordinates: 50°29′N 114°39′E
- Country: Russia
- Region: Zabaykalsky Krai
- District: Ononsky District
- Time zone: UTC+9:00

Bolshevik (Russian: Большевик) is a rural locality (a selo) in Ononsky District, Zabaykalsky Krai, Russia. Population: 397 (2010 census); 471 (2002 census); There are 10 streets in this selo.

== Geography ==
This rural locality is located 33 km from Nizhny Tsasuchey (the district's administrative centre), 191 km from Chita (capital of Zabaykalsky Krai) and 5,482 km from Moscow. Ust-Liska is the nearest rural locality.
