= Kholodny, Magadan Oblast =

Kholodny Холодный
- Urban-type settlement
- Interactive map of Kholodny
- Location of Kholodny Kholodny (Magadan Oblast)
- Coordinates: 62.7134°N 147.9124°E
- Country: Russia
- Federal subject: Magadan Oblast
- Administrative district: Susumansky District

Population (2010 Census)
  - Total: 1,062
  - Estimate (2025): 623 (−41.3%)
- Time zone: UTC+11 (MSK+8)
- Postal code: 686333
- OKTMO ID: 44713000056

Kholodny (Russian: Холо́дный) is an urban-type settlement in Magadan Oblast, Russia. Population: 1,062 (2010 census); 1,344 (2002 census); 1,826 (1989 Soviet census).

== Geography ==
Kholodny is located around 380 km north-north-west of the city of Magadan, by the Byoryolyokh river in the Upper Kolyma Highlands. It is in Susumansky District, 14 km from the administrative centre Susuman.

== History ==
The settlement was founded in 1941 as a gold mining base, gaining urban-type settlement status in 1962. The settlement's name Kholodny is the Russian word for cold.

== Infrastructure ==
Kholodny lies on the Kolyma Highway.
