= Bolshevik, Magadan Oblast =

Bolshevik Большевик
- Urban-type settlement
- Interactive map of Bolshevik
- Location of Bolshevik Bolshevik (Magadan Oblast)
- Coordinates: 62.6912°N 147.5795°E
- Country: Russia
- Federal subject: Magadan Oblast
- Administrative district: Susumansky District
- Elevation: 1,107 m (3,632 ft)

Population (2010 Census)
  - Total: 96
  - Estimate (2025): 4 (−95.8%)
- Time zone: UTC+11 (MSK+8)
- Postal code: 686336
- OKTMO ID: 44713000071

Bolshevik (Russian: Большевик) is an urban locality (an urban-type settlement) in Susumansky District of Magadan Oblast, Russia. Population: 96 (2010 census); 371 (2002 census); 960 (1989 Soviet census).

== Geography ==
Bolshevik is located in the Upper Kolyma Highlands near the Byoryolyokh river.
