= Saint Nicholas Church, Lviv =

Ukrainian church in Lviv, Ukraine

Saint Nicholas Church
- Церква Святого Миколая
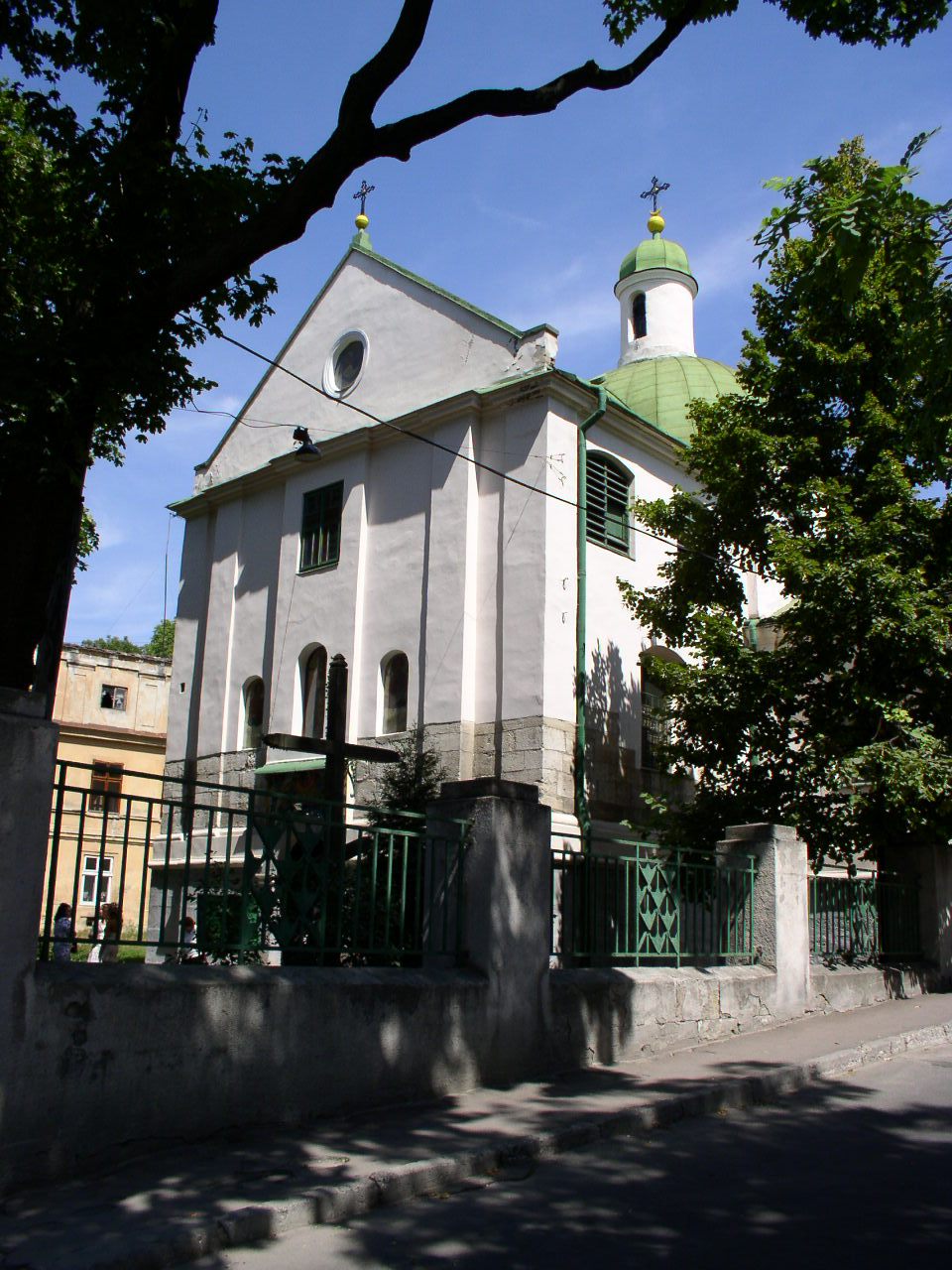

- Location within Lviv

Religion
- Affiliation: Orthodox Church of Ukraine

Location
- Location: Lviv
- Coordinates: 49°50′50.64″N 24°1′44.32″E

Architecture
- Completed: between 1264 and 1340

Saint Nicholas Church (Ukrainian: Церква Святого Миколая) is a religious building in Lviv, an active temple of the Orthodox Church of Ukraine, and an architectural monument of national importance. It is traditionally considered the oldest church in the city. It is located under Budelnytsia Hora at 28 Bohdan Khmelnytskyi Street (formerly Volynskyi Trakt).

== History ==
The date of construction of the church is unknown and is the subject of many interpretations and guesses. The location of the temple in one of the oldest historical districts, its layout, and documentary tradition dating back to 1292, when Prince Leo I of Galicia granted land to the church, indicate that the building may have been constructed in the early period of the city's history, between 1264 and 1340.

At the same time, the view established in modern science about the inauthenticity of the privilege leaves ample room for speculation about the earliest history of the building. In particular, some scholars suggest that Prince Danylo could have been the founder of the temple. At one time, it was the main princely church, located near the castle of the rulers of Galicia.

No traces of the fortifications of that time have survived, but from the chronicles that have come down to us, we know that there was a princely treasury in the courtyard near the church. From there, in the 1340s, attackers from the other side, led by the king of a neighboring state, took up spears and swords against the defenders of the Galician principality, destroyed the castle, and stole two golden crowns, a diamond-encrusted throne, precious crosses, a princely cloak, and other valuables.

Another assumption is that this church was an Orthodox cathedral even before the Poles conquered Lviv.

Documents show that St. Nicholas Church owned fields and estates, and King Sigismund granted the church's rector jurisdiction, meaning that the church received the right to collect taxes on its lands and even to administer justice.

Thus, in 1471, the church was exempted from taxes, and in 1543, the parish was exempted from castle jurisdiction.

From 1544, the St. Nicholas Brotherhood existed at the church. During the revival of the Orthodox Church, St. Nicholas Church played an important role as a center of faith and education. However, a fire in 1623 damaged the church, and throughout the century it suffered regular damage from Tatar raids.

From 1700, the church belonged to the Ukrainian Greek Catholic Church. After the Lviv pseudo-council in 1946, the church was illegally transferred to the jurisdiction of the Moscow Patriarchate of the Russian Orthodox Church.

During the celebration of the temple feast, the parish priest's sermon, delivered in Lviv in 1956, said: "How many storms have swept over our city during its long existence! The flow of time has washed everything away from the face of our land. Only this holy temple, under the special protection of St. Nicholas, has remained as a witness to the Christian faith of our fathers, grandfathers, and great-grandfathers". Amidst turbulent events, St. Nicholas Church managed to survive for more than seven centuries and wait for the right to serve the faithful in the Ukrainian Autocephalous Orthodox Church, which was unanimously supported by priests and laypeople in Lviv back in December 1989.

In 2018, the church became part of the Orthodox Church of Ukraine.

== Architecture ==
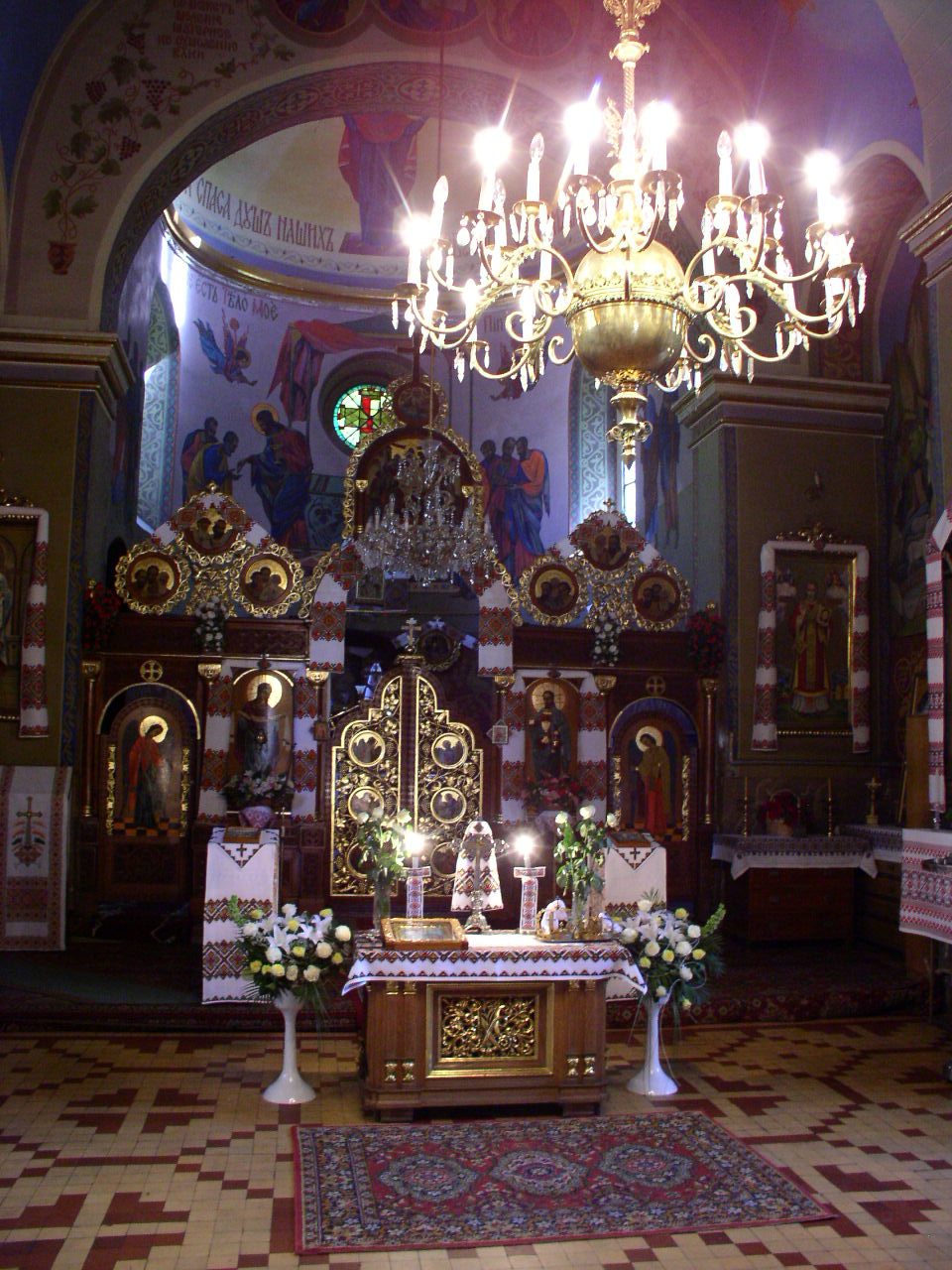

Archaeologists believe that the foundations of the temple are one of the oldest buildings in the settlement, constructed in the Byzantine architectural style.

The monument has not retained its original appearance. Only fragments of the walls remain from the original church. It was changed by major reconstructions after the fires of 1623 and 1800, when the shingle roofs, dome, and bell tower above the narthex burned down. The building was erected on an old cemetery, which confirms the existence of an older, possibly wooden church on this site.

The church is a unique cruciform structure with a square nave, around which are grouped the altar with a semicircular apse on the east side, a rectangular narthex, and side chapels, also with semicircular apses.

The nave and altar section of the cross-domed church are topped with domes with lanterns, typical of Ukrainian architecture. The spatial layout of St. Nicholas Church resembles that of ancient churches of Kievan Rus' and has analogues in the architecture of the South Slavs. The plan, the lower part of the stone walls, and the apses, built of hewn blocks of white limestone, remain from the 13th-century building. The use of hewn white stone in construction was widespread in the 12th–13th centuries in Kingdom of Galicia–Volhynia.

In the second half of the 17th century, the church was rebuilt and the work was completed in 1701, as evidenced by the inscription on the arch of the main nave. In 1776, a sacristy was added.

However, disaster did not spare the temple — a fire destroyed the ancient iconostasis in 1783, and after a fire in 1800, the church received two new domes and a tin roof. However, after additions and reconstructions, it retained the main features of ancient architecture — the plan of a Greek equal-armed cross and a central dome. In this way, it resembles Orthodox churches in southern countries, combining the traditions of Balkan and Armenian architecture.

The mix of the classic Byzantine-Rus cross-domed plan with Romanesque construction techniques creates a new, distinctive style characteristic of the architecture of ancient Galicia.

In 1926, a stone fence with iron bars was built around the church, manufactured by Mykhailo Stefanivskyi company and designed by Oleksandr Lushpynskyi.

During 2017–2018, restoration of the church continued, with approximately 5.5 million hryvnias allocated from the Lviv city budget. During the renovation work, the roof above the church itself was completely replaced with a new copper one, as the old roof had already been destroyed. In addition, the engineering networks, i.e., sewage and drainage, were replaced. The retaining wall and fence were also reinforced, and the grounds were landscaped and paved with natural stone.

== Church relics ==
Among the ancient art treasures preserved here are an icon of Theodore of Tyron (17th century) and an icon of the Virgin Mary, which is a valuable work of Lviv painting from the first half of the 17th century, similar in style to the school of painter Fedir Senkovych.

The church houses the relics of St. Nicholas, which were donated to the church by Patriarch Joachim V of Antioch during his stay in Lviv, Petro Mohyla euchologion from 1719, and a banner from 1760 with an image of St. Nicholas on one side and on the other side, Jesus Christ with his attendants.

Another Lviv shrine belonging to the church is the icon of St. Nicholas. The saint is depicted on the icon in Byzantine vestments against a gilded background. The church also has an icon of Saint Theodore Tyron from the former Church of Saint Theodore, which stood near the Church of Saint Nicholas. The icon of Saint Theodore Tyron is a reminder in Lviv of the churches that were destroyed here.

The frescoes on the main facade of the church depicting St. Nicholas, the Crucifixion, St. John, and the Virgin Mary were painted in 1924 by Ukrainian artist Petro Kholodnyi.

The modern iconostasis was made in the pseudo-Byzantine style in 1947–1949, and the wall paintings were done in 1955–1957 on the order of priest Vanchitskyi, based on a design by priest Volodymyr Yarema, by painters Karlo Zvirynskyi, Stanislav Servetnyk, M. Tkachenko, and V. Masiutko. In 1990, the church's paintings were unsuccessfully repainted, so they require professional restoration.

In 2014, wooden sculptures of angels were found in the bell tower of St. Nicholas Church. According to art experts, these works are most likely by the outstanding Johann Georg Pinsel (mid-18th century). The sculptures were restored by specialists.

On the initiative of the clergy, the community of St. Nicholas Church, the King Danylo Art Foundation, and scholars researching the history of the oldest Orthodox church in Lviv, an exhibition entitled "Treasures of St. Nicholas Prince's Church in Lviv" was created.

== Gallery ==
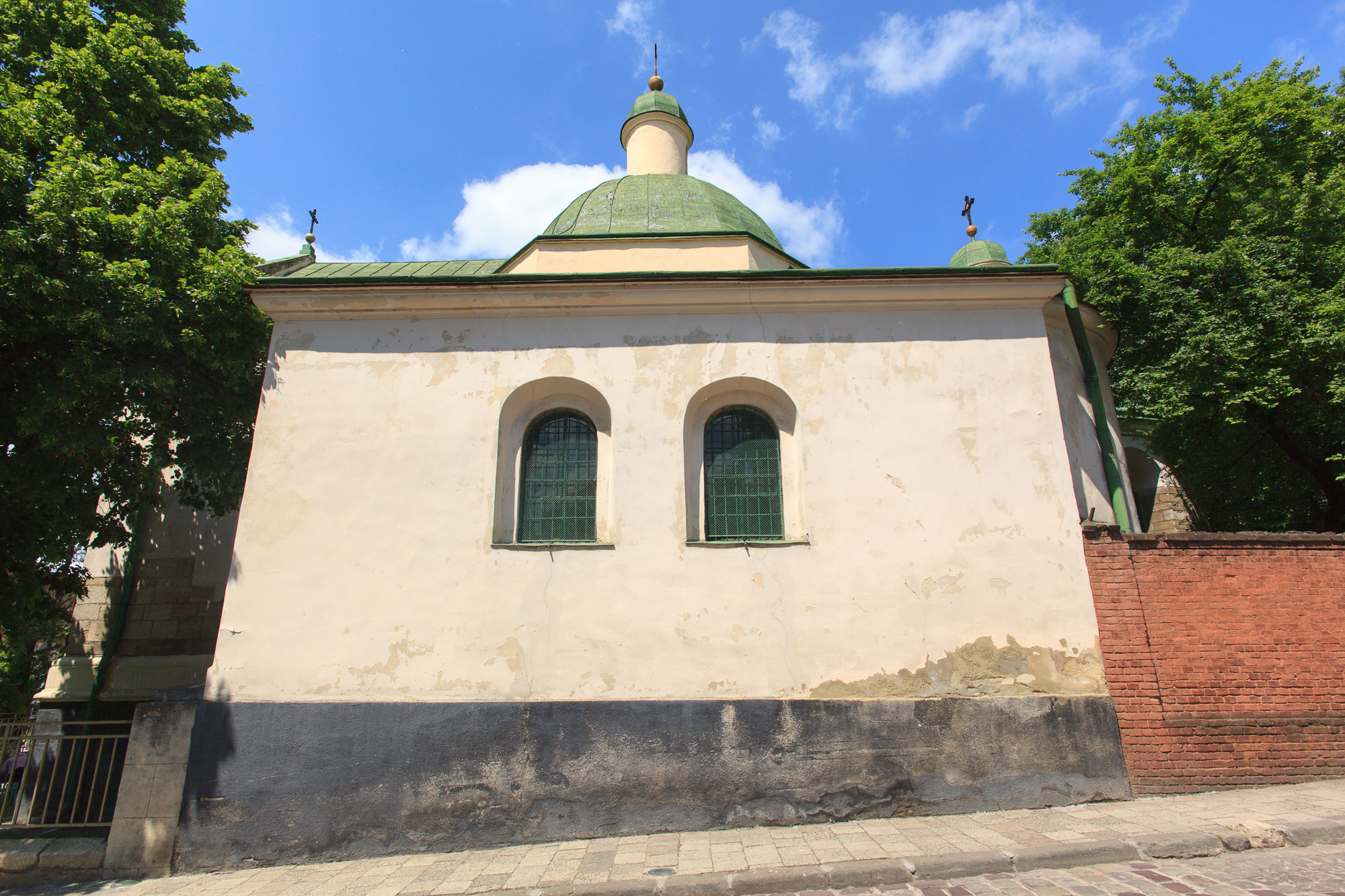

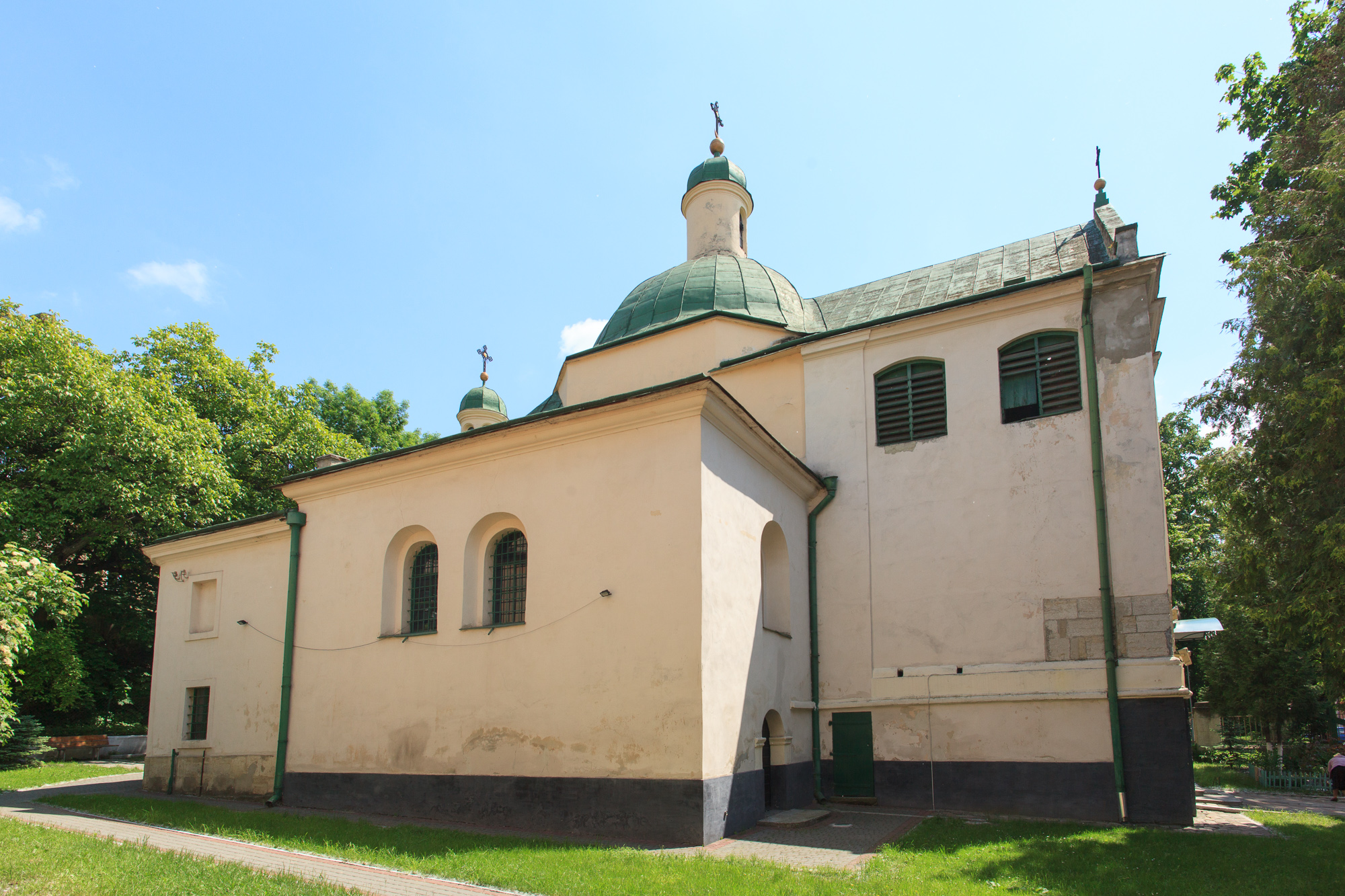

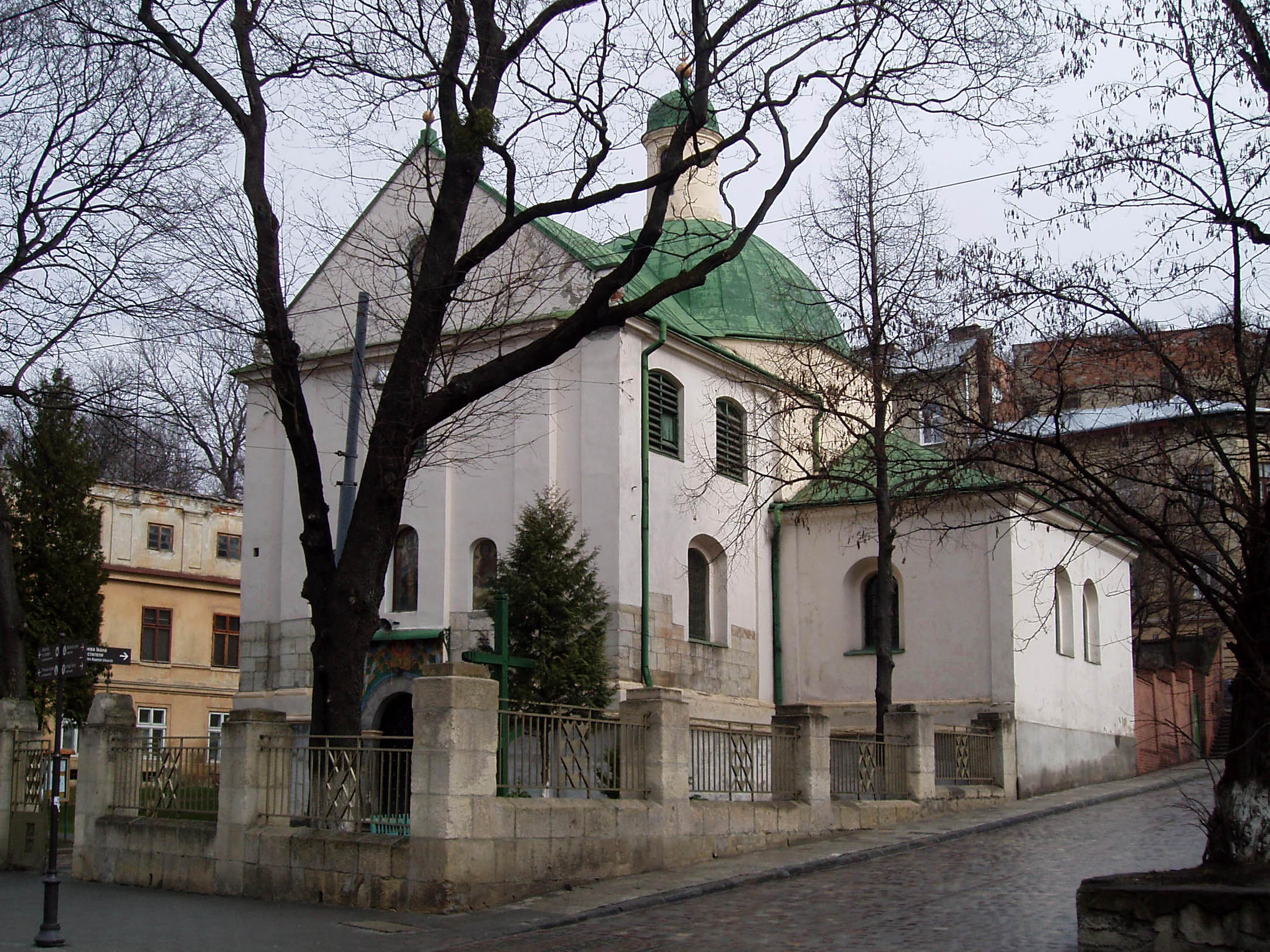

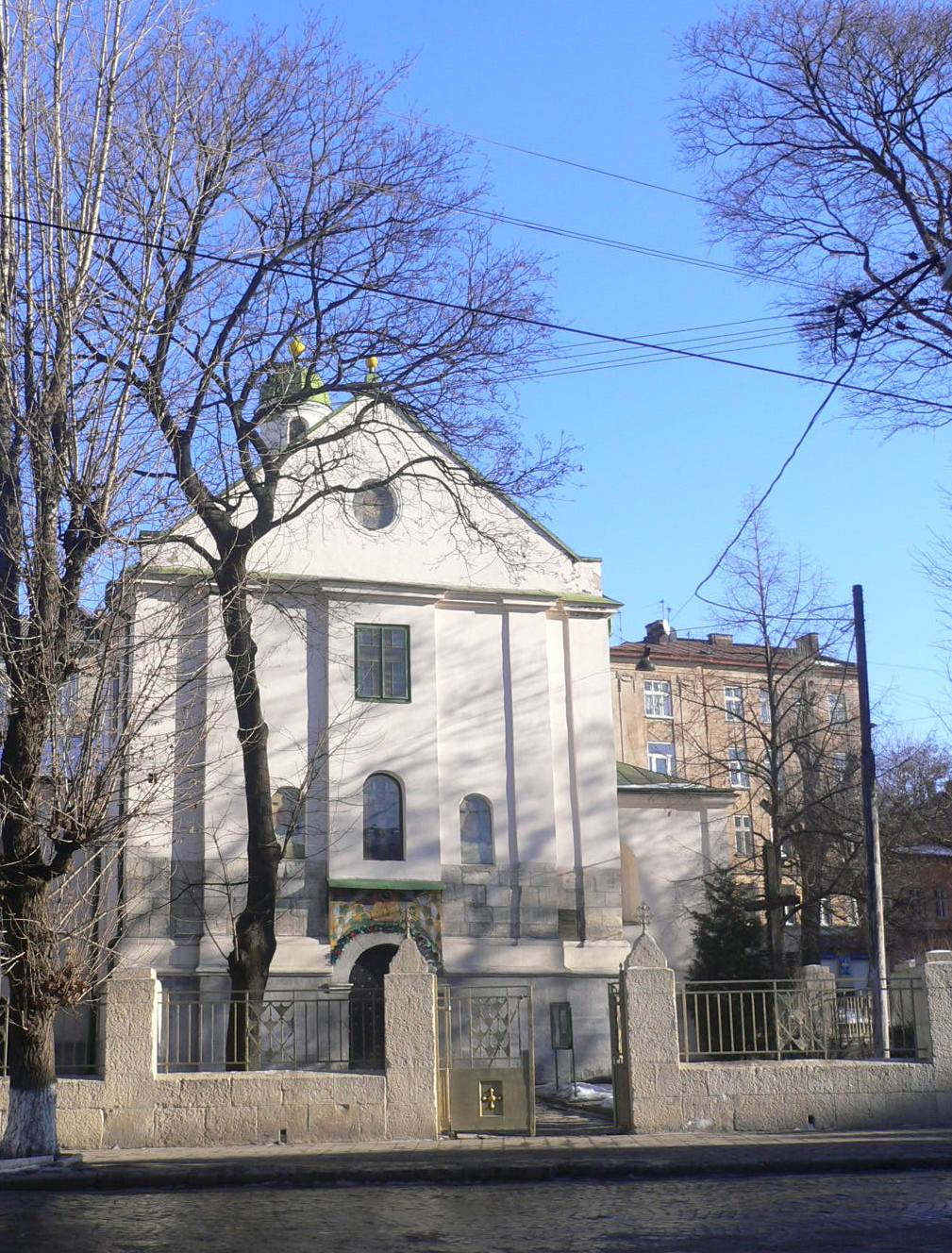

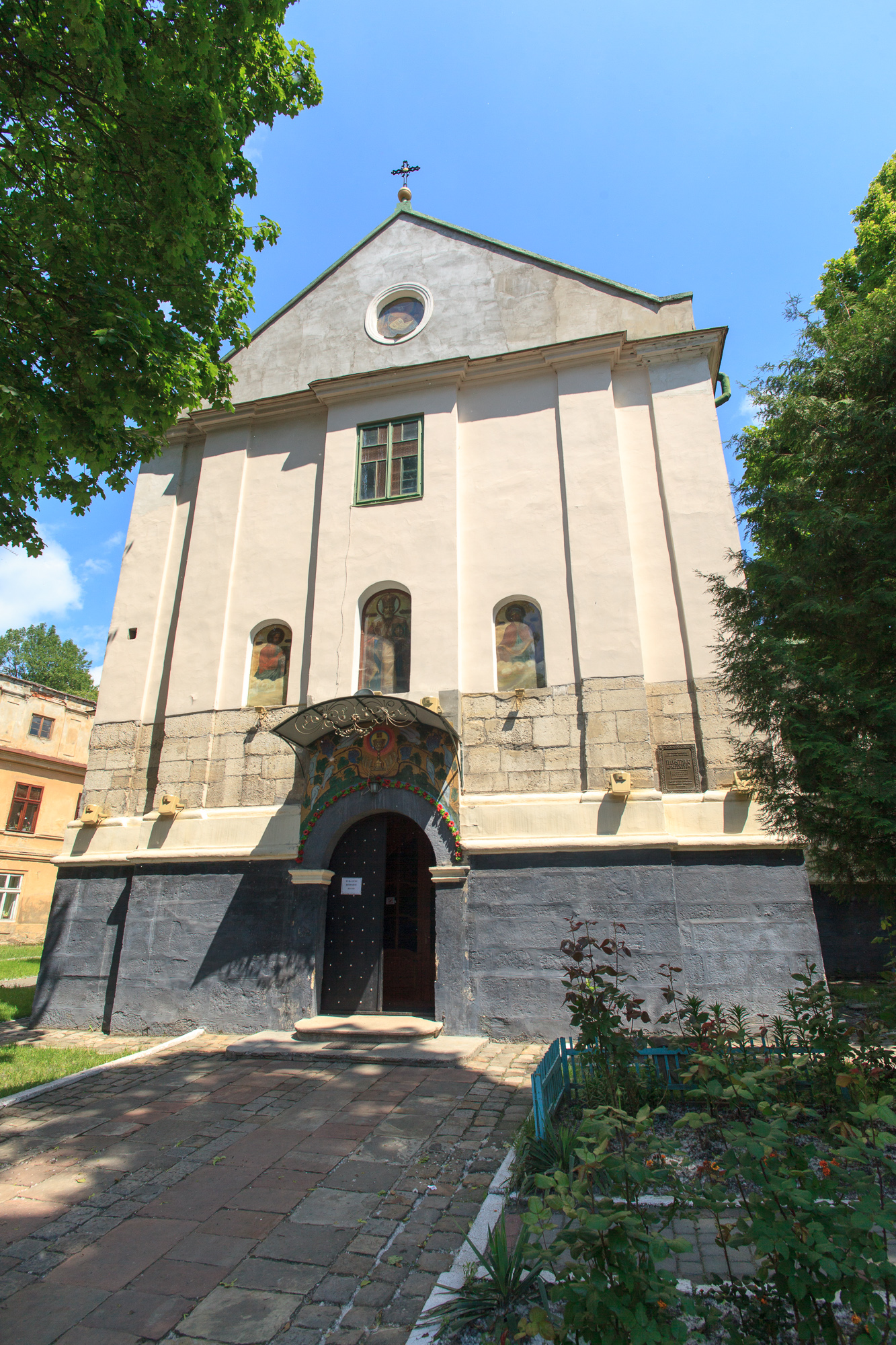

== Bibliography ==
- Свідок княжого Львова. Церковця св. Миколи при Жовківській вулиці // Станиславівське слово. — 1943. — Р. ІІІ. — Ч. 22 (53, 3 січня). — С. 4.
- Архітектура Львова: Час і стилі. XIII—XXI ст.. — Львів : Центр Європи, 2008. — С. 52. — ISBN 978-966-7022-77-8.
- Туристична карта Львова. — 2007.
