= Petro Kholodnyi =

Ukrainian painter and politician (1875–1930)

- Петро Холодний
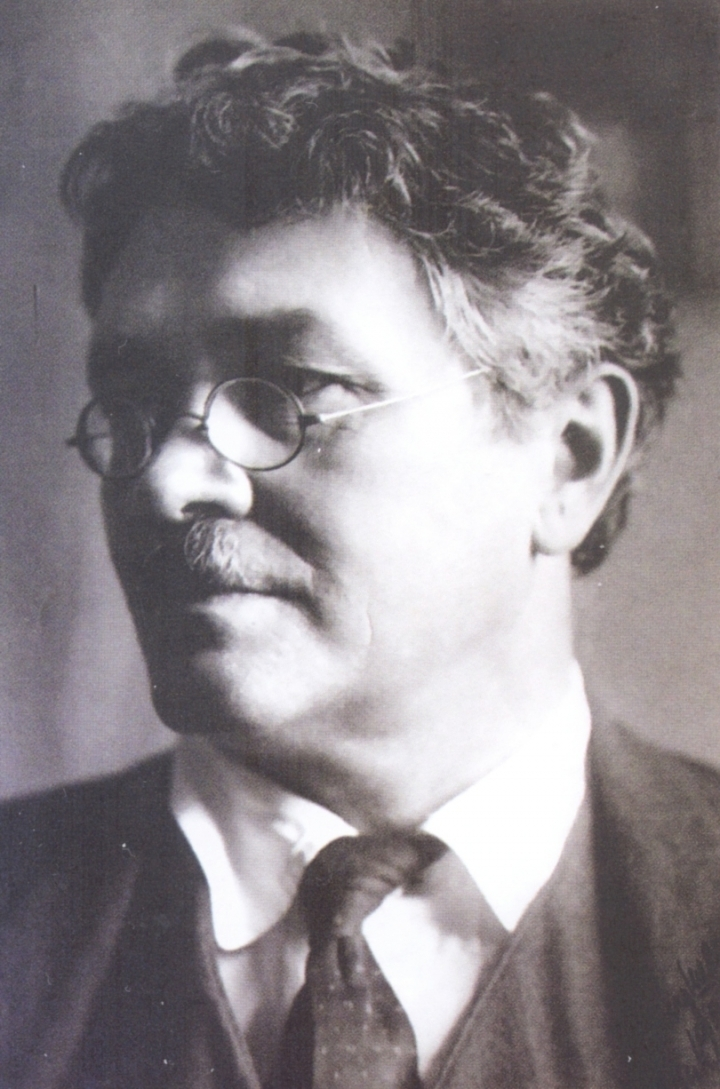

Minister of Public Education of Ukraine
- In office 26 May 1919 – 1920
- Prime Minister: Borys Martos; Isaak Mazepa; Viacheslav Prokopovych
- Preceded by: Antin Krushelnytskyi
- Succeeded by: Position abolished (Hryhoriy Hrynko as People's Commissar for Education)
- In office 26 December 1918 – 2 February 1919
- Prime Minister: Volodymyr Chekhivskyi
- Preceded by: Volodymyr Naumenko
- Succeeded by: Ivan Ohienko

Personal details
- Born: 18 December 1875 Pereiaslav, Russian Empire
- Died: 7 June 1930 (aged 54) Warsaw, Poland
- Party: Ukrainian Party of Socialist-Federalists
- Children: 1 (Petro)

Petro Ivanovych Kholodnyi (Ukrainian: Петро Іванович Холодний; 18 December 1875 – 7 June 1930) was a Ukrainian painter and politician who served as Minister of Public Education from 1918 to 1920 in the government of the Ukrainian People's Republic. He was also a member of the Central Rada, Minister of Public Education of the Ukrainian People's Republic, painter, chemist. He was also an impressionist painter with a tendency to lyricism and a neo-Byzantine painter, a monumentalist, graphic artist, designer of applied art, and teacher. He is the father of the painter Petro Cholodny.

During the Ukrainian Revolution (1917–1921), he worked at the Secretariat of Public Education of the Ukrainian Central Rada and the Ministry of Education.

He headed the Ministry of Education of the UPR Directorate from 26 December 1918 to 2 February 1919 and from 26 May to the end of 1920.

== Works ==
- Icons and stained-glass windows in the Dormition Church and the iconostasis and polychromy of the chapel of St. Josaphat of the UGCC Theological Seminary and Theological Academy in Lviv (now the academic building of the Geography Faculty of Ivan Franko National University, Doroshenko Street).
- A number of icons in the churches of the villages: Radelychi, Kholoiiv (now Vuzlove, Radekhiv Raion), Borshchovychi, Zubrets, Vyzhniany.
- Stained-glass windows of the Church of the Assumption in Mraznytsia (now a section of Boryslav), created under the supervision of Bohdan Lepkyi).
- Petro Kholodnyi also used his knowledge of ancient painting techniques to create polychrome paintings on the facade of Saint Nicholas Church (1924, 28 Bohdan Khmelnytskyi Street), which is a model of Byzantine architecture of the thirteenth century in Lviv, as well as to restore the paintings on the facade of St. Onufriy Church of the Basilian Monastery in Lviv (36/38 Bohdan Khmelnytskyi Street).

== Commemorating ==
- Petro Kholodnyi Lane in Pervomaisk, Mykolaiv Oblast.
- Petro Kholodnyi streets in Lviv and Ochakiv.

== Bibliography ==
- Енциклопедія українознавства : Словникова частина : [в 11 т.] / Наукове товариство імені Шевченка ; гол. ред. проф., д-р Володимир Кубійович. — Париж — Нью-Йорк : Молоде життя, 1955—1995. — ISBN 978-5-7707-4049-3.
- Крвавич Д. Мальовила Петра Холодного в каплиці Духовної семінарії у світлі львівської преси 1929 року // Записки Наукового товариства імені Шевченка. — Т. CCXXVII. Праці Секції мистецтвознавства. — Львів, 1994. — С. 435—449.
- Стрельський Г. Холодний Петро // Енциклопедія історії України : у 10 т. / редкол.: В. А. Смолій (голова) та ін. ; Інститут історії України НАН України. — К. : Наукова думка, 2013. — Т. 10 : Т — Я. — С. 408. — ISBN 978-966-00-1359-9.
- Голубець М. Холодний / Микола Голубець. — Львів: Укр. мистецтво, 1926. — 25 с.
