= Balshavik =

Balshavik (Belarusian: Бальшавік; Russian: Большевик, romanized: Bolshevik) may refer to the following:

== Places ==
- Balshavik, Gomel region, a work settlement in Gomel District, Gomel Region
- Balshavik, Minsk region, an agrotown in Minsk District, Minsk Region

== Other uses ==
- Balshavik (KPZB organ), an organ of the Central Committee of the Communist Party of Western Belorussia (KPZB)

== See also ==
- Bolshevik (inhabited locality)
