= Oleksandr Romanovskyi =

Ukrainian politician

Oleksandr Romanovskyi Олександр Володимирович Романовський
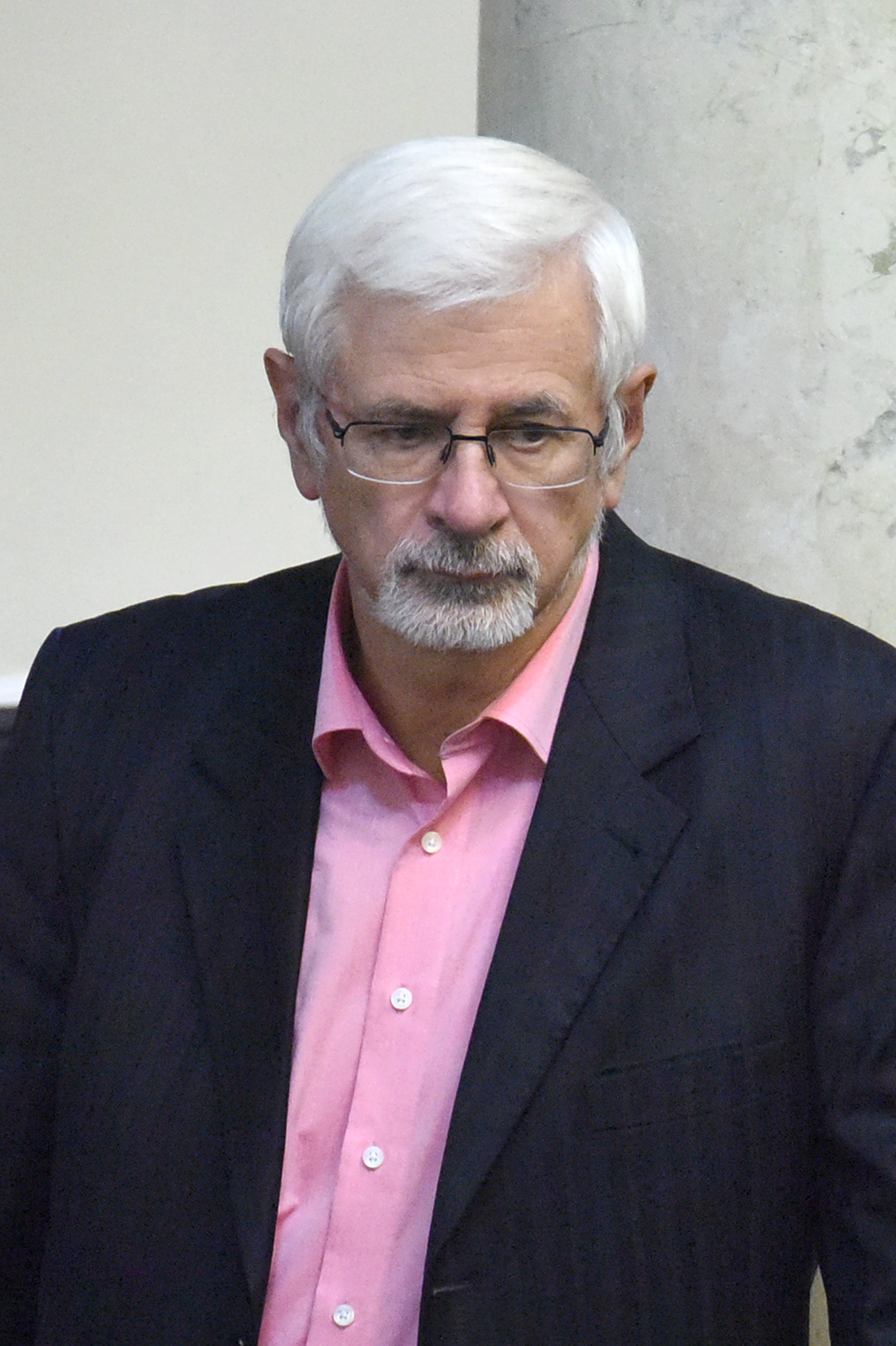

Personal details
- Born: 10 August 1952 (age 74) Russia
- Party: People's Front (Ukraine)
- Education: Zaporizhzhia National Technical University

Oleksandr Volodymyrovych Romanovskyi (Ukrainian: Олександр Володимирович Романовський; (born 10 August 1952, Neksykan Village, Susumansky District, Magadan Oblast, Russia) — a Ukrainian politician and statesman. People's Deputy of Ukraine of the 8th convocations.

== Live ==
Graduated from Zaporizhzhia National Technical University, specialty: radio engineering (1974). A Vice-President of Zaporizhzhia Regional Unit of industrialists and employers «Potensial», a general director — Chief Structural Engineer of limited liability company (LLC) «Scientific-research enterprise „Hartron-Yukom“». He worked at different posts at limited liability company (LLC) «Scientific-research enterprise „Hartron-Yukom“»: as an engineer, senior engineer, deputy general director — economy, finances and marketing director — the head of economy, finances and marketing management. People's Deputy of Ukraine of the VIIIth convocation. He was elected at national-wide multi-mandate electoral district from political party "People’s Front", number in the list: 72, the date of being in power as a deputy: December 9, 2014. Faction: Member of the deputy faction of Political party “People’s Front” Post: Member of the Verkhovna Rada of Ukraine Committee on Economic Policy.

- a member of Interim Investigations committee of the Verkhovna Rada of Ukraine on issues of technical audit of building carrying out and the check of utilization efficiency of budget funds at bridge crossings building over the Dnieper River in Zaporizhzhia.
- a member of the group on interparliament tights with the United Kingdom of Great Britain and Northern Ireland.
- the member of group on interparliament tights with Canada.
- the member of group on interparliament tights with People's Republic of China.
- the member of group on interparliament tights with Israel State.
- the member of group on interparliament tights with the Kingdom of Norway.

== Honours ==
- Awarded with Order of Merit 3rd Class (2009),
- Honoured industry employee of Ukraine.
