= Lauren Kolodny =

American entrepreneur and venture capitalist

- Education: Brown University; Stanford University; Stanford Graduate School of Business
- Occupations: Managing Partner, Acrew Capital
- Known for: Co-Founder, Acrew Capital
- Website: Acrew Capital profile

Lauren Kolodny (born c. 1985/86) is an American entrepreneur and venture capitalist. She is the co-founder and Managing Partner of the venture capital firm Acrew Capital. She was on the Forbes Midas List in both 2023 and 2024.

== Early life and education ==
Kolodny earned a Bachelor of Arts in International Relations from Brown University in 2008, a Master of Sciences in Sustainable Design from Stanford University, and an MBA from Stanford Graduate School of Business. In 2009, at age 23, Kolodny became the youngest ever trustee on Brown University's Board of Trustees and served on the search committee that selected Brown’s current president, Christina Paxson.

== Career ==
Kolodny started her career developing clean technology partnerships for the Clinton Foundation while based in New Delhi, India. She later worked in product marketing at Google, where she led launches for Google Workspace, including the launch of Google Drive for businesses.

Kolodny met Aspect Ventures co-founder Theresia Gouw through her time at Brown University where they became friends. Kolodny later joined Gouw at Aspect in 2015 and became a partner in the firm in 2017. She left Aspect Ventures in 2019 to co-found Acrew Capital along with Gouw, Asad Khaliq, Vishal Lugani and Mark Kraynak.

Kolodny was a member of Forbes 30 Under 30 in 2016. In 2020, she was featured in The Wall Street Journal's 10 Women to Watch list; and, the list of 100 Rising Stars of Venture Capital in the Business Insider. She was also on the Forbes Midas List in both 2023 and 2024.

=== Acrew Capital ===
Acrew Capital is a venture capital firm that focuses on seed, early and growth-stage investments in sectors that include Data & Security, Fintech, and Digital Health. Its fintech practice was built and is led by Kolodny, with investments in companies such as Chime. As of 2025, Acrew Capital manages a portfolio of more than $1.7+ billion AUM.
