= Avinoam Kolodny =

Israeli professor of electrical engineering

- אבינעם קולודני
- Known for: Over 160 books and peer-reviewed articles
- Scientific career
- Fields: Electrical Engineering
- Institutions: Technion – Israel Institute of Technology

Avinoam Kolodny (Hebrew: אבינעם קולודני) is an Israeli professor of electrical engineering at Technion. He is an author and co-author of more than 160 books and peer-reviewed articles all of which were cited 6548 times.
