= Petro Cholodny =

- Петро Холодний
- Born: July 22, 1904; Kiev, Russian Empire (now Kyiv, Ukraine)
- Died: January 24, 1990 (aged 85); Glen Spey, New York, United States
- Occupations: Artist, iconographer, painter
- Known for: Icons, mosaics, stained glass
- Style: Neo-Byzantine
- Spouse: Nataliia Livytska-Kholodna

Petro Petrovych Cholodny (Note: Ukrainian: Петро Петрович Холодний, romanized: Petro Petrovych Kholodnyi) (July 22, 1904 – January 24, 1990) was a painter, graphic artist and iconographer, born in Kyiv, Ukraine. His father Petro Kholodnyi was an artist and iconographer, whose icons adorned the Dormition Church Lviv, the iconostasis and murals of the Chapel of the Greek Catholic Theological Seminary in Lviv, Ukraine.

== Early life ==
Cholodny was married to Nataliia Livytska-Kholodna, Ukrainian poet and daughter of Andriy Livytskyi, the last prime minister of the Ukrainian People's Republic.

== Artistic work and influences ==
Cholodny believed in the importance of the icon as a portal for prayer. To serve the faithful, the church the iconographer had to adhere to centuries old traditions and symbols so that the icon fulfills its function. It must not draw attention to itself and a painting with a religious subject need not be an icon. Cholodny when interviewed often spoke of the transgressions of artists and architects who took liberties with these necessary precepts and traditions.

Cholodny was a naturalist, and late in life had an enormous collection of beetles and avidly studied Entomology. His wife Nataliia, often commented that his approach to art work slow and methodical, while he pursued fishing and beetles with great zeal in old age. Although, he often painted landscapes and figurative compositions, he took special pleasure in his large, carefully rendered portraits of beetles. Ukrainian Canadian Art Historian, Daria Darewych explains that these insect renderings "represent a synthesis of icon traditions, scientific observation and contemporary pictorial concerns." She believes that they are Cholodny the Younger's greatest achievement and "inventive contribution to art generally and to Ukrainian art specifically."

His background in graphic arts proved useful for many years he while illustrated the Ukrainian children's monthly Veselka, and did bookplate, logo, and monogram design. His work is distinguished by its elegant, and light line. One-man exhibitions of his work were held in Philadelphia in 1973 and New York at the Ukrainian Institute and Chicago in 1977. In 1982, a retrospective exhibition was held on his 80th birthday in New York City. The Ukrainian Museum mounted an exhibition of three generations of Cholodny painters in 2001. Andrew Charyna, Cholodny's grandson, is also a painter living in Canada. In 2001, The Ukrainian Museum in NYC did an exhibition of Three Generations of Cholodny Artists: Petro Cholodny, the Elder, Petro Cholodny the Younger and Andrew Charyna.

Cholodny's significant works include monumental icons in a Neo-Byzantine style for several Ukrainian churches in the US. He created iconostasis, mosaics and stained glass windows for numerous churches and thus is credited for the revival of the Ukrainian-Byzantine art traditions of Iconography in the United States.

At the end of his life, Cholodny moved to Glen Spey, NY where an enclave of Ukrainians settled in the Catskills where they were reminded them of the territories of Western Ukraine, their homeland. There he continued to avidly collect beetles, go fishing and to paint. The small town of Glen Spey, boasts two Ukrainian Churches, one Ukrainian Orthodox and one Byzantine Catholic, both with icons painted by Cholodny.

== Selected works ==
- Ukrainian Orthodox Cathedral of St. Volodymyr in New York City, iconostasis
- Church of the Assumption of the Blessed Virgin Mary, Lourdes, France - iconostasis
- St. Andrew's Ukrainian Orthodox Memorial Church in South Bound Brook, NJ - iconostasis and mosaics
- St. John the Baptist Ukrainian Catholic Church in Newark, NJ, stained glass, and mosaic stations of the cross
- St. John the Baptist Ukrainian Catholic Church, Hunter, NY - iconostasis
- St Volodymyrs Ukrainian Catholic Church, Glen Spey, NY - iconostasis
- St. George Ukrainian Catholic Church, NYC - the stained-glass windows
- The Ukrainian Orthodox Church of the Holy Trinity, Trenton, NJ
- Bookplate "Yurii Lypa"
- Religious Icons at Ukrainian Museum in Stamford, CT
