= Bolshevik, Yelansky District, Volgograd Oblast =

Bolshevik Большевик
- Settlement
- Location within Volgograd Oblast Location within Russia
- Coordinates: 50°38′N 43°45′E
- Country: Russia
- Region: Volgograd Oblast
- District: Yelansky District
- Time zone: UTC+4:00

Bolshevik (Russian: Большевик) is a rural locality (a settlement) and the administrative center of Bolshevistskoye Rural Settlement, Yelansky District, Volgograd Oblast, Russia. The population was 809 as of 2010. There are 8 streets.

== Geography ==
Bolshevik is located on Khopyorsko-Buzulukskaya Plain, on the right bank of the Buzuluk River, 55 km south of Yelan (the district's administrative centre) by road. Bulgurino is the nearest rural locality.
