= Natalia Liwycka-Chołodna =

Ukrainian poet

Natalia Andriyivna Livytska-Kholodna (Ukrainian: Наталя Андріївна Лівицька-Холодна, romanized: Natalia Andriivna Livytska-Kholodna; 15 June 1902 in Zolotonosha – 28 April 2005 in Toronto) was a Ukrainian poet, best remembered for her poems Vohon' i popil (1934), Sim liter (1937) and Poeziji stari i nowi (1986). She was the daughter of Andriy Livytskyi, the last prime minister of the Ukrainian People's Republic. She was married to Ukrainian artist and iconographer Petro Cholodny the Younger and had a daughter named Ida.
