= Kholodnoye, Prokhorovsky District, Belgorod Oblast =

Kholodnoye Холодное
- Selo
- Location within Belgorod Oblast Location within Russia
- Coordinates: 51°00′N 37°06′E
- Country: Russia
- Region: Belgorod Oblast
- District: Prokhorovsky District
- Time zone: UTC+3:00

Kholodnoye (Russian: Холодное) is a rural locality (a selo) in Prokhorovsky District, Belgorod Oblast, Russia. The population was 895 as of 2010. There are 13 streets.

== Geography ==
Kholodnoye is located 28 km east of Prokhorovka (the district's administrative centre) by road. Studyony is the nearest rural locality.
