= Balshavik (KPZB organ) =

Issue 41 of Balshavik, published in 1930

Balshavik (Belarusian: Бальшавік, meaning 'Bolshevik') was the theoretical and publication organ the Central Committee of the Communist Party of Western Belorussia (KPZB). Publication began in Wilno in December 1924 as a clandestine party organ and ran until 1936.

Around the time of the publishing of the second issue of Balshevik on December 31, 1924, the Balshevik printing press was seized by a dissident faction of KPZB (the setsessiya, 'secession', group or kamunikatčyki, who established a Provisional Central Committee of their own). Between December 31, 1924, and March 1925 the 'secession' faction published 15 issues of Balshevik, which in Soviet historiography was branded as a 'fake' version of the publication. They used the publication to distribute their communique (thus their nick-name kamunikatčyki) of critiques against the leadership of the Communist Party of Poland. In the 15 Balshevik issues that the dissident faction they repeatedly attacked the Communist Party of Poland and its Central Committee. The dissident group was expelled from the KPZB by decision of its Central Committee.

The KPZB Central Committee resumed publishing of Balshevik on June 10, 1925, with the (according to Soviet histiography) the third issue of Balshevik. A fourth issue was published on December 21, 1925. From February 1926 onwards the publishing had a more regular schedule. Balshevik was dedicated to questions of Marxist-Leninist theory and party-building. Issues of Balshevik contained articles by the leaders of the Communist Party of Poland and the Communist Party of Western Belorussia, news items on the activities of the sections of the Communist International, and the revolutionary movement in Western Belorussia. It had recurring segments titled 'From Party Life' and 'In Soviet Belorussia'.

All in all some 50 issues of Balshevik were published (not counting the issues published by the 'secession' dissident group), by average being published once every two months. Until issue 5/6 (July–August 1926) Balshevik was a Russian language publication. From issue 7/8 (September–October 1926) until issue 30 (July 1929) both Russian and Belorussian language was used, and later Balshevik became a monolingual Belorussian publication. The circulation stood at 15–17,000 copies during 1927–1930, but dropped to 3–5,000 copies per issue in the period of 1931–1936. Balshevik was published in a newspaper format, with issues having 12 pages. From its 41th issue, published in December 1930, Balshevik shifted to a magazine journal format with issues having around 50–70 pages each. Publishing was later shifted to Minsk. Leopold Rodzevich served as the editor of the publication during most of its existence. Editorial board members included Anatol Olshevsky, Motal Blinchikov, S. I. Budzinski, and others.
