= Vasyliv =

Commune in Chernivtsi Oblast, Ukraine

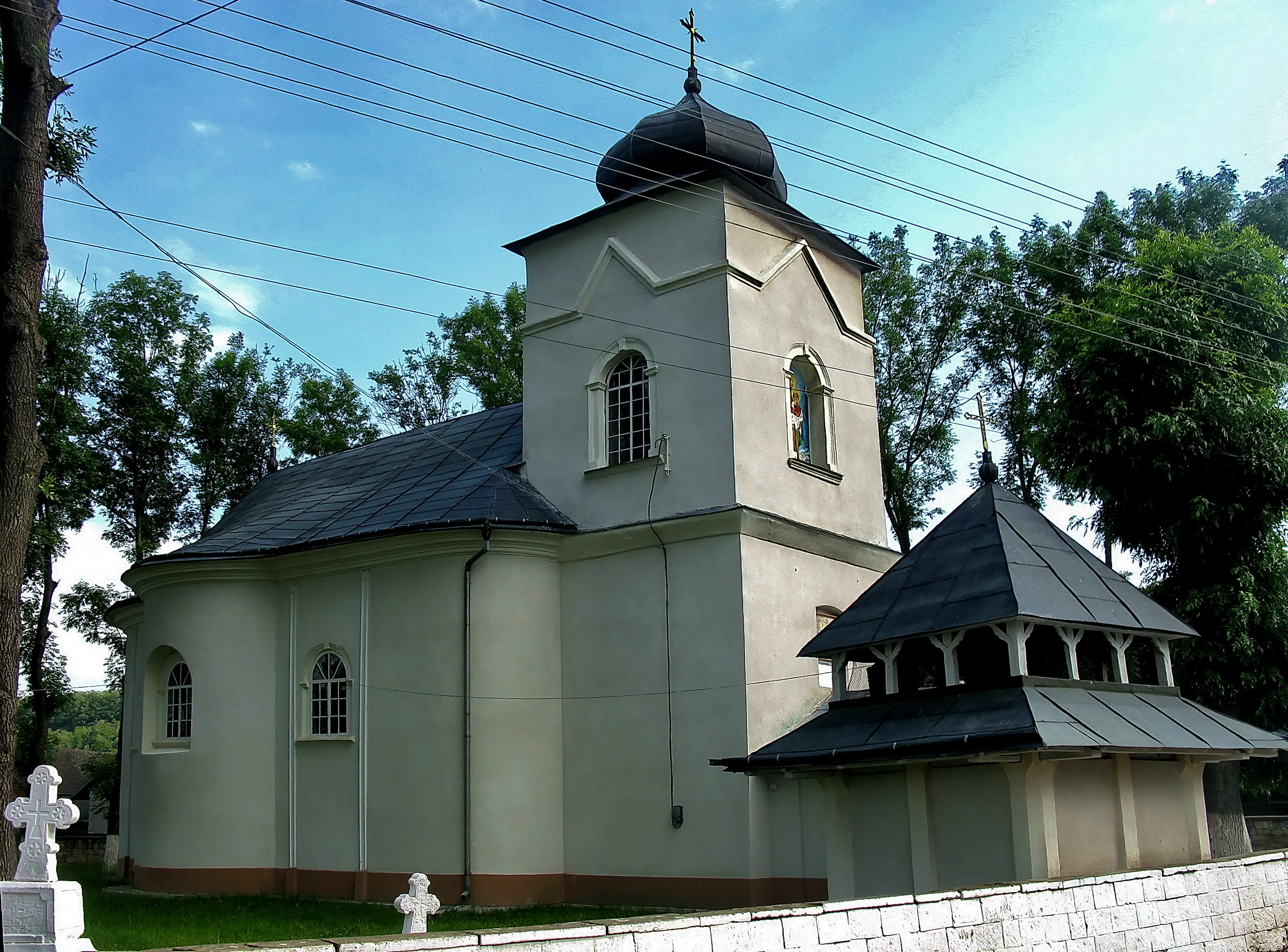
- Church of the Nativity of Mother of God

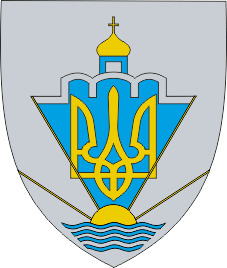
- Coat of arms
- Interactive map of Vasyliv
- Coordinates: 48°36′15″N 25°50′30″E
- Country: Ukraine
- Oblast: Chernivtsi Oblast
- Raion: Chernivtsi Raion
- Hromada: Kadubivtsi rural hromada
- First written mention: 1230
- Elevation: 149 m (489 ft)

Population
  - Total: 1,229
- Postal code: 59416

Vasyliv (Ukrainian: Василів; Romanian: Vasilău) is a village in Chernivtsi Raion, Chernivtsi Oblast, Ukraine. It belongs to Kadubivtsi rural hromada, one of the hromadas of Ukraine.

Until 18 July 2020, Vasyliv belonged to Zastavna Raion. The raion was abolished in July 2020 as part of the administrative reform of Ukraine, which reduced the number of raions of Chernivtsi Oblast to three. The area of Zastavna Raion was merged into Chernivtsi Raion.

Vasyliv is located near the site of a ruined ancient city of the same name, which was an important Kievan Rus' trading town on the Dniester. Its first mention comes from the 12th century chronicles, when it served as an important river crossing.
