= Bolshevik, Voronezh Oblast =

Bolshevik Большевик
- Settlement
- Location within Voronezh Oblast Location within Russia
- Coordinates: 51°01′N 41°36′E
- Country: Russia
- Region: Voronezh Oblast
- District: Novokhopyorsky District
- Time zone: UTC+3:00

Bolshevik (Russian: Большеви́к) is a rural locality (a settlement) in Novokhopyorsk, Novokhopyorsky District, Voronezh Oblast, Russia. The population was 171 as of 2010.

== Geography ==
Bolshevik is located 11 km south of Novokhopyorsk (the district's administrative centre) by road. Kamenka-Sadovka is the nearest rural locality.
