= Susuman Airport =

- IATA: none; ICAO: UHMH; LID: ССМ

Summary
- Airport type: Public
- Location: Susuman
- Elevation AMSL: 2,129 ft / 649 m
- Coordinates: 62°46′0″N 148°8′48″E

Map
- Location in Magadan Oblast

Runways
Direction	Length		Surface
Direction	ft	m	Surface
04/22	5,741	1,750	Asphalt

Susuman Airport (ICAO: UHMH) is a minor airport built 2 kilometres (1.2 mi) south of Susuman in Magadan Oblast, Russia

== History ==
It was built during World War II for the Alaska-Siberian (ALSIB) air route used to ferry American Lend-Lease aircraft to the Eastern Front. The airport closed about 1998 and the control tower was converted to an Orthodox church and the airport's main building to a monastery.

The airport reopened in 2012 serving 4 flights a week to Magadan's Sokol Airport.

== Airlines and destinations ==
Airlines	Destinations
SiLA Airlines	Magadan

== See also ==
- List of airports in Russia
