= Bolshevik, Vladimir Oblast =

Bolshevik Большевик
- Settlement
- Location within Vladimir Oblast Location within Russia
- Coordinates: 56°23′N 39°24′E
- Country: Russia
- Region: Vladimir Oblast
- District: Kolchuginsky District
- Time zone: UTC+3:00

Bolshevik (Russian: Большевик) is a rural locality (a settlement) and the administrative center of Ilyinskoye Rural Settlement, Kolchuginsky District, Vladimir Oblast, Russia. The population was 295 as of 2010. There are 7 streets.

== Geography ==
Bolshevik is located 15 km north of Kolchugino (the district's administrative centre) by road. Lychevo is the nearest rural locality.
