= Susuman =

Susuman Сусуман
- Town
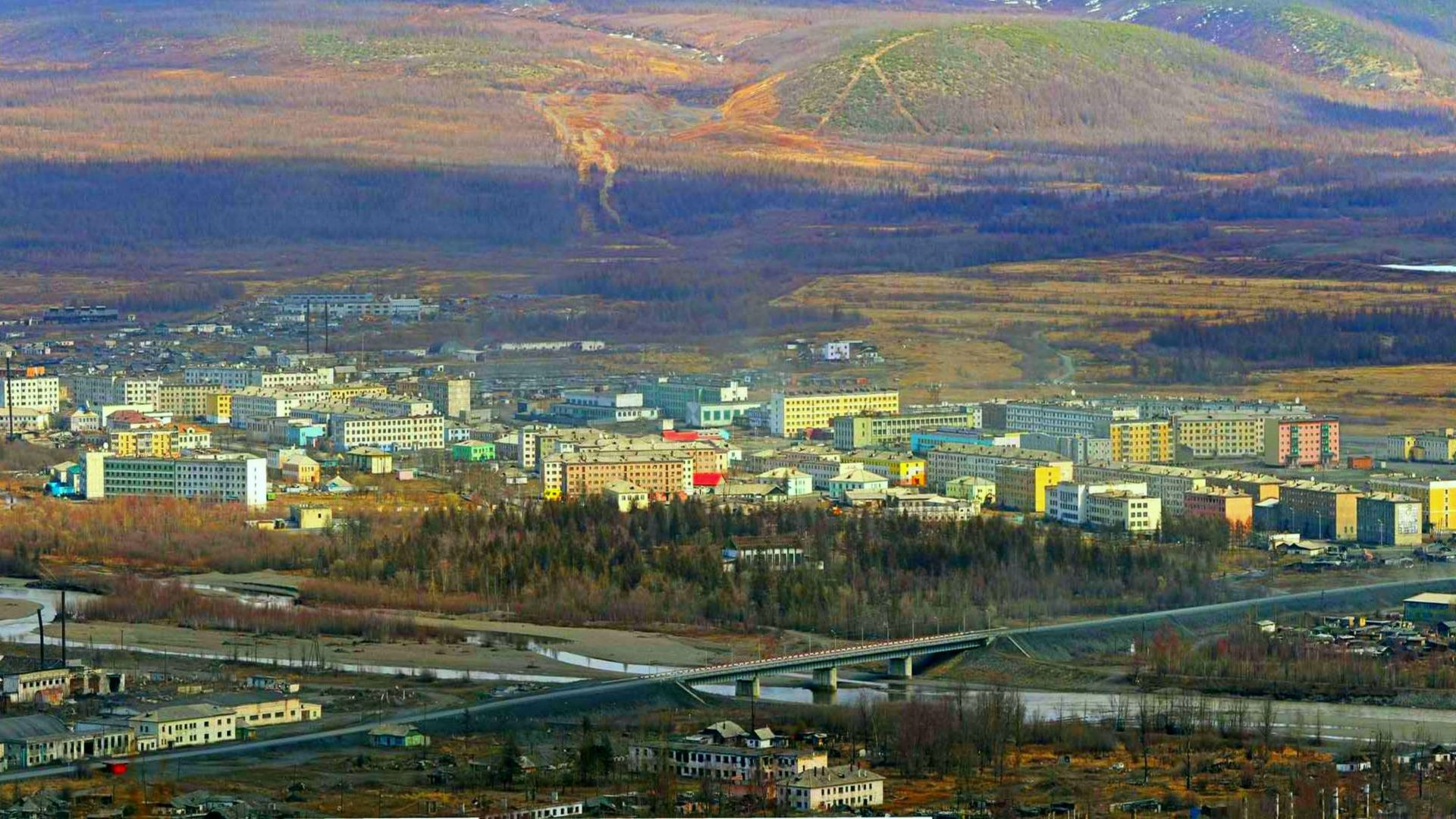
- View of central Susuman and the Byoryolyokh River

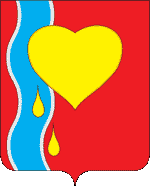
- Flag Coat of arms
- Interactive map of Susuman
- Location of Susuman Susuman (Magadan Oblast)
- Coordinates: 62°47′N 148°10′E
- Country: Russia
- Federal subject: Magadan Oblast
- Administrative district: Susumansky District
- Founded: 1936
- Town status since: 1964
- Elevation: 650 m (2,130 ft)

Population (2010 Census)
  - Total: 5,855
  - Estimate (2024): 4,175 (−28.7%)

Administrative status
  - Capital of: Susumansky District

Municipal status
  - Municipal district: Susumansky Municipal District
  - Urban settlement: Susuman Urban Settlement
  - Capital of: Susumansky Municipal District, Susuman Urban Settlement
- Time zone: UTC+11 (MSK+8)
- Postal code: 686314
- Dialing code: +7 41345
- OKTMO ID: 44713000001
- Website: www.magadan.ru/ru/municipal/rnsusuman/susuman.html

Susuman (Russian: Сусума́н) is a town and the administrative center of Susumansky District in Magadan Oblast, Russia, located on the Byoryolyokh River, 650 kilometers (400 mi) northwest of Magadan, the administrative center of the oblast. Population: 4,439 (2021 census); 5,855 (2010 census); 7,833 (2002 census); 16,818 (1989 Soviet census).

== Geography ==
The town lies in the Upper Kolyma region near where the Susuman River joins the Byoryolyokh. The town sits on the M56 Kolyma Highway, an unsealed track often known as the "Road of Bones", which connects Yakutsk with Magadan.

== History ==
It was founded in 1936 as a settlement of a sovkhoz called Susuman, named after the nearby river of the same name. In 1938, the settlement was greatly expanded to become a center of gold mining in the western part of what is now Magadan Oblast under the control of Dalstroy.

Gold mining and other industrial operations in the region were largely reliant on corrective labor camps of the Gulag system, with a large number operating in Susuman's vicinity. From 1949 until 1956, Susuman was the base for one of the Soviet Union's largest corrective labor camps, the Zaplag of the Dalstroy program. During this time, up to 16,500 prisoners were kept in the camps.

One of the camp burial grounds was located beyond the town cemetery. Stakes bearing signs with numbers survived but the inscriptions on the nameplates disappeared. Several crosses have also survived. A tall Orthodox cross has been fastened to one of the trees in the burial ground.

Susuman was granted town status in 1964. In the post-Soviet period, the population dropped significantly, from a high of around 18,000 inhabitants in 1991, down to 4,439 as of the 2021 Census.

== Climate ==
Susuman has an extreme dry-winter subarctic climate (Köppen climate classification Dwd/Dwc) with extremely cold, dry winters and short, very mild summers. It is one of the coldest permanently inhabited settlements in the world, with a yearly mean temperature of −11.5 °C (11.3 °F). All 12 months have experienced a frost, and Susuman has never recorded an above-freezing temperature between 14 November and 16 March inclusive, and only once (on 13 November of 2006) between 27 October and 16 March inclusive.

Climate data for Susuman (1991–2020)
| Month | Jan | Feb | Mar | Apr | May | Jun | Jul | Aug | Sep | Oct | Nov | Dec | Year |
|---|---|---|---|---|---|---|---|---|---|---|---|---|---|
| Record high °C (°F) | −4.1 (24.6) | −1.6 (29.1) | 1.4 (34.5) | 12.1 (53.8) | 26.1 (79.0) | 33.2 (91.8) | 35.0 (95.0) | 33.0 (91.4) | 24.4 (75.9) | 11.3 (52.3) | 2.1 (35.8) | −1.6 (29.1) | 35.0 (95.0) |
| Mean daily maximum °C (°F) | −32.9 (−27.2) | −26.9 (−16.4) | −15.3 (4.5) | −3.4 (25.9) | 9.5 (49.1) | 19.7 (67.5) | 22.4 (72.3) | 18.1 (64.6) | 9.2 (48.6) | −6.7 (19.9) | −23.2 (−9.8) | −32.6 (−26.7) | −5.2 (22.7) |
| Daily mean °C (°F) | −37.4 (−35.3) | −33.2 (−27.8) | −23.6 (−10.5) | −10.9 (12.4) | 3.5 (38.3) | 12.2 (54.0) | 14.9 (58.8) | 10.8 (51.4) | 2.9 (37.2) | −12.6 (9.3) | −27.8 (−18.0) | −36.5 (−33.7) | −11.5 (11.3) |
| Mean daily minimum °C (°F) | −41.5 (−42.7) | −38.3 (−36.9) | −31.1 (−24.0) | −19.2 (−2.6) | −3.1 (26.4) | 4.5 (40.1) | 7.5 (45.5) | 4.0 (39.2) | −2.4 (27.7) | −17.8 (0.0) | −32.1 (−25.8) | −40.4 (−40.7) | −17.5 (0.5) |
| Record low °C (°F) | −60.6 (−77.1) | −59.9 (−75.8) | −53.7 (−64.7) | −44 (−47) | −27.5 (−17.5) | −8.3 (17.1) | −4.6 (23.7) | −11.1 (12.0) | −24.3 (−11.7) | −44.7 (−48.5) | −53.8 (−64.8) | −58.5 (−73.3) | −60.6 (−77.1) |
| Average precipitation mm (inches) | 9.4 (0.37) | 7.6 (0.30) | 5.4 (0.21) | 6.1 (0.24) | 14.6 (0.57) | 42.3 (1.67) | 59.0 (2.32) | 65.9 (2.59) | 34.9 (1.37) | 20.0 (0.79) | 17.0 (0.67) | 9.8 (0.39) | 292 (11.49) |
| Average precipitation days (≥ 0.1 mm) | 13.9 | 11.8 | 8.1 | 6.1 | 7.4 | 12.7 | 13.7 | 13.2 | 10.2 | 11.6 | 13.5 | 13.1 | 135.3 |
| Mean monthly sunshine hours | 20 | 89 | 213 | 283 | 273 | 291 | 274 | 223 | 152 | 132 | 53 | 10 | 2,013 |
Source 1: climatebase.ru (1937–2012)
Source 2: pogodaiklimat.ru (temperatures)

Historical population
| Year | Pop. | ±% |
|---|---|---|
| 1959 | 13,310 | — |
| 1970 | 12,643 | −5.0% |
| 1979 | 16,025 | +26.7% |
| 1989 | 16,818 | +4.9% |
| 2002 | 7,833 | −53.4% |
| 2010 | 5,855 | −25.3% |
| 2021 | 4,439 | −24.2% |
Source: Census data

== Administrative and municipal status ==
Within the framework of administrative divisions, Susuman serves as the administrative center of Susumansky District, to which it is directly subordinated. As a municipal division, the town of Susuman is incorporated within Susumansky Municipal District as Susuman Urban Settlement.

== Economy ==
The town's economy relies mainly on its status as one of the centers of gold mining in the Kolyma region.

=== Transportation ===
The town is served by the Susuman Airport, with four flights a week from Magadan.

== Documentary ==
Susuman and its nearby Dalstroy goldmine is portrayed in the prizewinning documentary on the Gulag in the far east of Siberia GOLD Lost in Siberia (VPRO/The Netherlands 1994) YouTube: www.imdb.com by a Dutch filmteam, led by author Gerard Jacobs and filmmaker Theo Uittenbogaard
