= Susumansky District =

Susumansky District Сусуманский район (Russian)
- District
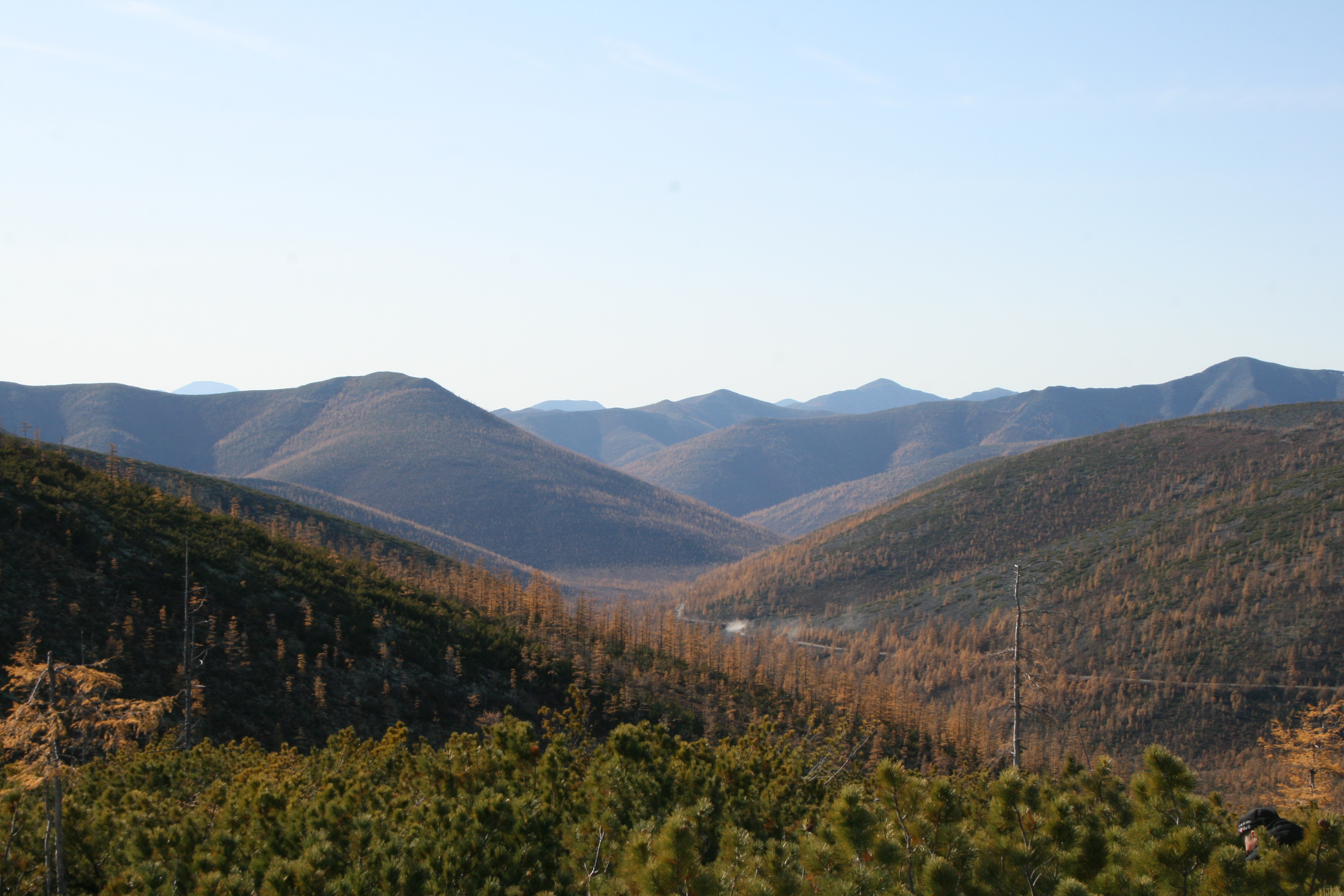
- Burkhalinsky Pass as seen from the Susuman side

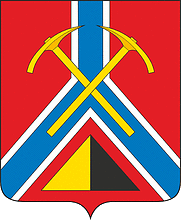
- Flag Coat of arms
- Location of Susumansky District in Magadan Oblast
- Coordinates: 62°47′N 148°09′E
- Country: Russia
- Federal subject: Magadan Oblast
- Established: December 2, 1953
- Administrative center: Susuman

Area
  - Total: 46,800 km^{2} (18,100 sq mi)

Population (2010 Census)
  - Total: 9,015
  - Estimate (January 2017): 1,471
  - Density: 0.193/km^{2} (0.499/sq mi)
  - Urban: 97.1%
  - Rural: 2.9%

Administrative structure
  - Inhabited localities: 1 cities/towns, 6 urban-type settlements, 6 rural localities

Municipal structure
  - Municipally incorporated as: Susumansky Urban Okrug
- Time zone: UTC+11 (MSK+8)
- OKTMO ID: 44713000
- Website: http://susumanskiy-rayon.ru

Susumansky District (Russian: Сусума́нский райо́н) is an administrative district (raion), one of the eight in Magadan Oblast, Russia. As a municipal division, it is incorporated as Susumansky Urban Okrug. It is located in the southeast of the oblast and borders the Sakha Republic in the west and north, Srednekansky District in the east, and Yagodninsky and Tenkinsky Districts in the south. The area of the district is 46,800 square kilometers (18,100 sq mi). Its administrative center is the town of Susuman. As of the 2010 Census, the total population of the district was 9,015, with the population of Susuman accounting for 65.0% of that number.

Historical population
Year	Pop.	±%
1959	35,365	—
1970	41,573	+17.6%
1979	47,787	+14.9%
1989	47,950	+0.3%
2002	14,022	−70.8%
2010	9,015	−35.7%
2021	6,458	−28.4%
Source: Census data

== Geography ==
The landscape of the district is mostly mountainous. The Nera Plateau and the Tas-Kystabyt are located in the northwestern part of the district.

== History ==
The district was established on December 2, 1953.

== Administrative and municipal status ==
Within the framework of administrative divisions, Susumansky District is one of the eight in the oblast. The town of Susuman serves as its administrative center.

As a municipal division, the district has been incorporated as Susumansky Urban Okrug since May 1, 2015. Prior to that date, the district was incorporated as Susumansky Municipal District, which was subdivided into three urban settlements and one rural settlement.

== Economy ==
The main industries in the district are gold and coal mining. Despite being rich in natural resources, the district economy suffered in the first decades of the 2000s. The severe climate and poorly developed infrastructure are partly to blame, but the difficult transition from Soviet times has led to the collapse of a number of companies with the result that many inhabitants have left the region.

== Notable residents ==
- Oleksandr Romanovskyi (born 1952 in Neksykan village), Ukrainian politician
- Efim Shifrin (born 1956 in Neksykan village), actor and singer
