= Nizhny Tsasuchey =

Nizhny Tsasuchey Нижний Цасучей
- Selo
- Interactive map of Nizhny Tsasuchey
- Location of Nizhny Tsasuchey Nizhny Tsasuchey (Zabaykalsky Krai)
- Coordinates: 50°30′N 115°07′E
- Country: Russia
- Federal subject: Zabaykalsky Krai
- Administrative district: Ononsky District
- Founded: 1727

Population (2010 Census)
  - Total: 3,363

Administrative status
  - Capital of: Ononsky District
- Time zone: UTC+9 (MSK+6)
- Postal code: 674480
- OKTMO ID: 76634445101

Nizhny Tsasuchey (Russian: Нижний Цасучей) is a rural locality (a selo) and the administrative center of Ononsky District of Zabaykalsky Krai, Russia. Population: 3,363 (2010 census); 3,427 (2002 census); 3,452 (1989 Soviet census).

== Geography ==
The village is about 245 km southeast of the regional capital Chita. It is on the right bank of the Onon River. The Ononsky Museum of Local History is located here.

== History ==
Nizhny Tsasuchey was founded as a border outpost in 1727. By 1923, there was a three-year parochial school, a veterinary post, a nunnery, a bakery, and a horse farm. In 1927, the Komsomol cell was founded. Until the 1990s, the airport operated.
