= Ononsky District =

Ononsky District Ононский район (Russian)
- District
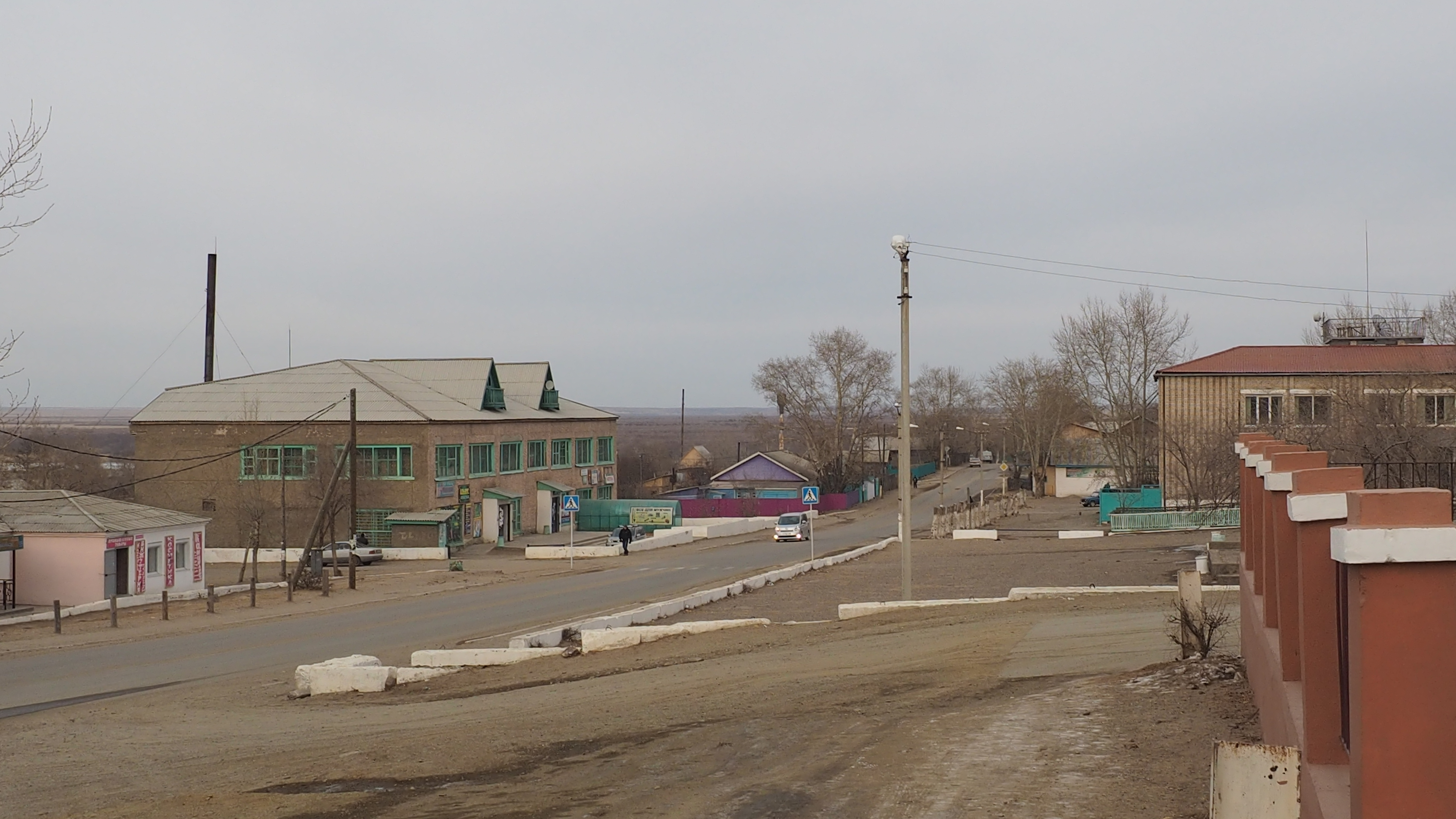
- Street scene in Ononsky District

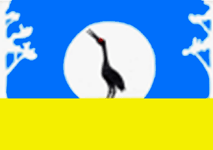
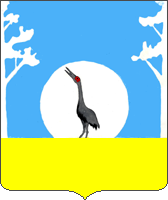
- Flag Coat of arms
- Location of Ononsky District in Zabaykalsky Krai
- Coordinates: 50°21′N 115°02′E
- Country: Russia
- Federal subject: Zabaykalsky Krai
- Established: February 5, 1941
- Administrative center: Nizhny Tsasuchey

Area
  - Total: 5,800 km^{2} (2,200 sq mi)

Population (2010 Census)
  - Total: 11,199
  - Estimate (2018): 9,807 (−12.4%)
  - Density: 1.9/km^{2} (5.0/sq mi)
  - Urban: 0%
  - Rural: 100%

Administrative structure
  - Inhabited localities: 21 rural localities

Municipal structure
  - Municipally incorporated as: Ononsky Municipal District
  - Municipal divisions: 0 urban settlements, 11 rural settlements
- Time zone: UTC+9 (MSK+6)
- OKTMO ID: 76634000
- Website: http://онон.забайкальскийкрай.рф

Population of Ononsky District
- 2010 Census: 11,199
- 2002 Census: 13,614
- 1989 Census: 16,414
- 1979 Census: 14,880

Ononsky District (Russian: Оно́нский райо́н) is an administrative and municipal district (raion), one of the thirty-one in Zabaykalsky Krai, Russia. It is located in the south of the krai, and borders Aginsky District in the north, Borzinsky District in the east, and Akshinsky District in the west. The area of the district is 5,800 square kilometers (2,200 sq mi). Its administrative center is the rural locality (a selo) of Nizhny Tsasuchey. As of the 2010 Census, the total population of the district was 11,199, with the population of Nizhny Tsasuchey accounting for 30.0% of that number.

== History ==
The district was established on February 5, 1941.
