= Srednekansky District =

Srednekansky District Среднеканский район (Russian)
- District
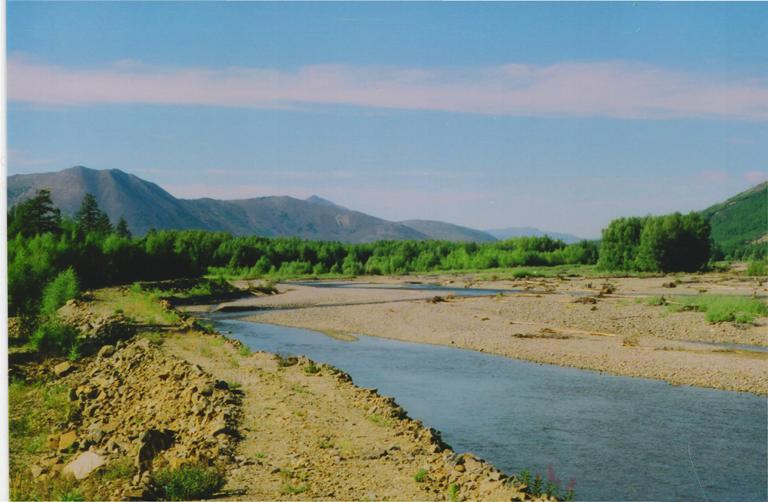
- The Medvezhya River, a tributary of the Seymchan in Srednekansky District

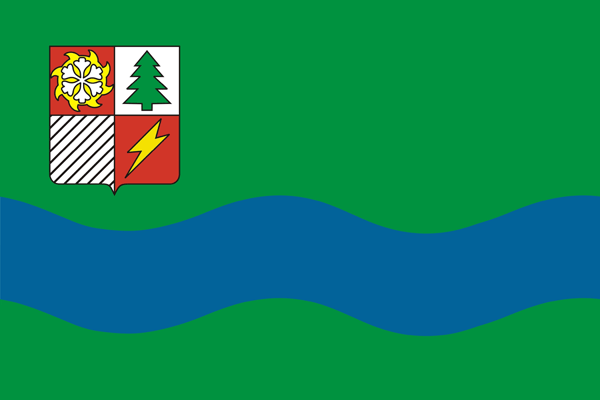
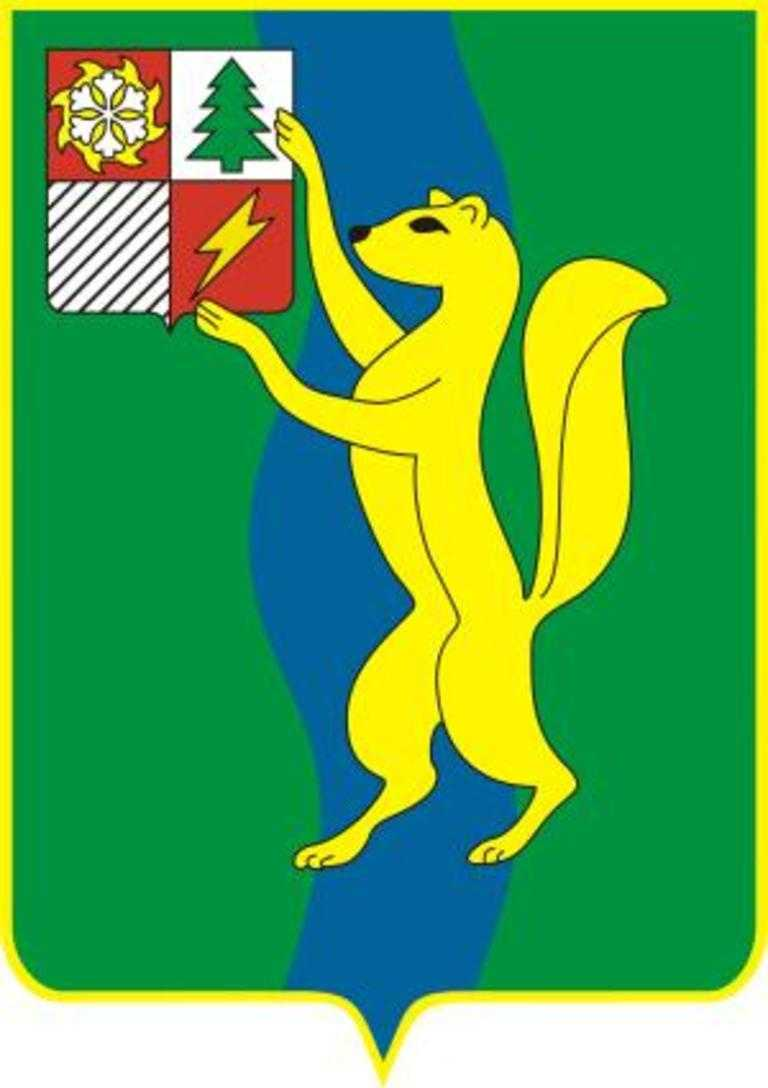
- Flag Coat of arms
- Location of Srednekansky District in Magadan Oblast
- Coordinates: 63°56′N 153°41′E
- Country: Russia
- Federal subject: Magadan Oblast
- Established: August 23, 1931
- Administrative center: Seymchan

Area
  - Total: 91,818.35 km^{2} (35,451.26 sq mi)

Population (2010 Census)
  - Total: 3,228
  - Estimate (January 2017): 2,385
  - Density: 0.03516/km^{2} (0.09105/sq mi)
  - Urban: 87.3%
  - Rural: 12.7%

Administrative structure
  - Inhabited localities: 1 urban-type settlements, 4 rural localities

Municipal structure
  - Municipally incorporated as: Srednekansky Urban Okrug
- Time zone: UTC+11 (MSK+8)
- OKTMO ID: 44710000
- Website: http://admmosrednekan.ru

Srednekansky District (Russian: Среднека́нский райо́н) is an administrative district (raion), one of the eight in Magadan Oblast, Russia. As a municipal division, it is incorporated as Srednekansky Urban Okrug. It is located in the central and northern parts of the oblast. Its administrative center is the urban locality (an urban-type settlement) of Seymchan. As of the 2010 Census, the total population of the district was 3,228, with the population of Seymchan accounting for 87.3% of that number.

Historical population
Year	Pop.	±%
1959	6,766	—
1970	11,354	+67.8%
1979	14,423	+27.0%
1989	16,594	+15.1%
2002	5,461	−67.1%
2010	3,228	−40.9%
2021	2,275	−29.5%
Population size may be affected by changes in administrative divisions. Source: Censuses

== Geography ==
The district borders the Sakha Republic in the north and northwest, Bilibinsky District of Chukotka Autonomous Okrug and Severo-Evensky District in the northeast, Omsukchansky District in the east, Khasynsky District in the south, Yagodninsky District in the southwest, and Susumansky District in the west. The area of the district is 91,818.35 square kilometers (35,451.26 sq mi).

The Omolon flows at the northeastern border. The Namyndykan, Seymchan, Buyunda, Korkodon, Bulun, and their tributaries flow across the district.

== History ==
The district was established on August 23, 1931 and had its administrative center in Srednekan. In 1934, the administrative center was moved to Taskan. Seymchan became the administrative center on December 2, 1953.

== Administrative and municipal status ==
Within the framework of administrative divisions, Srednekansky District is one of the eight in the oblast. The urban locality (an urban-type settlement) of Seymchan serves as its administrative center.

As a municipal division, the district has been incorporated as Srednekansky Urban Okrug since January 9, 2015. Prior to that date, the district was incorporated as Srednekansky Municipal District, which was subdivided into one urban settlement and one rural settlement.

== Economy ==
The main industries of the district are gold, silver, tin, cobalt, bismuth, tungsten, lead, zinc, and coal mining. In addition, under the protection of the mountain ranges, the area in the valley of the Kolyma River lends itself for agricultural production.

=== Transportation ===
The district is served by the Seymchan Airport in Seymchan.
