= Seymchan =

Seymchan may refer to:

- Seymchan (urban-type settlement), an urban-type settlement in Magadan Oblast, Russia
- Seymchan (Kolyma), a tributary of the Kolyma
- Seymchan Airport, an airport in Magadan Oblast
- Seymchan (meteorite), a meteorite found in 1967 in Russia
