= Kongin Range =

Mountain range in Russia

- Конгинский хребет
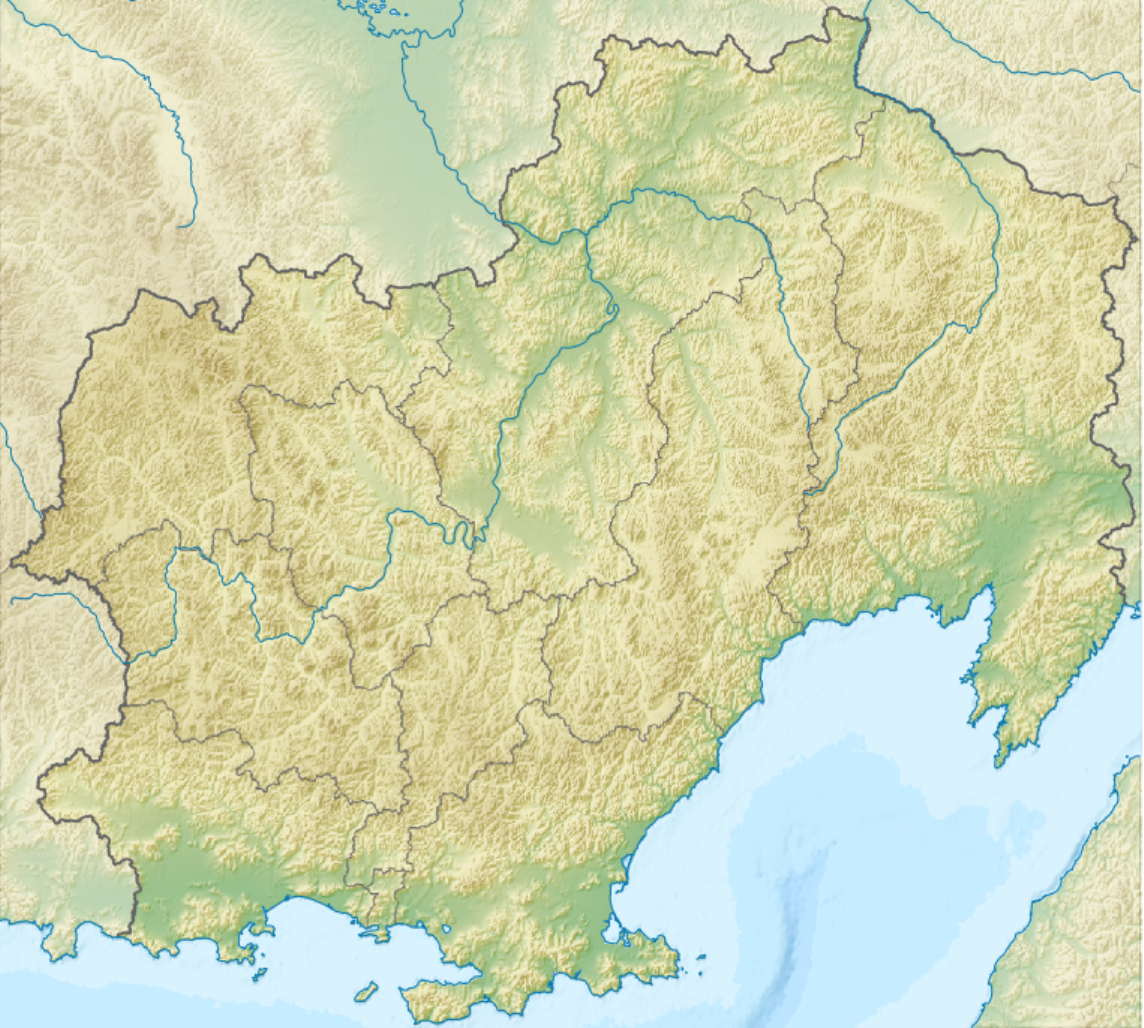
- Location within Magadan Oblast Location within Far Eastern Federal District

Highest point
- Peak: Unnamed
- Elevation: 1,486 m (4,875 ft)

Dimensions
- Length: 175 km (109 mi) NW/SE
- Width: 40 km (25 mi) NE/SW

Geography
- Country: Russia
- Federal subject: Magadan Oblast
- District: Severo-Evensky District; Srednekansky District
- Range coordinates: 65°0′N 158°0′E
- Parent range: Kolyma Highlands, East Siberian System

Geology
- Orogeny: Alpine orogeny
- Rock age(s): Devonian, Jurassic and Cretaceous
- Rock type(s): Limestone, dolerite, andesite and rhyolite

The Kongin Range (Russian: Конгинский хребет or Конгинские Горы) is a mountain range in Magadan Oblast, Far Eastern Federal District, Russia.

The area of the range is uninhabited. Geologically the range is composed of limestone, dolerite and andesite of the Devonian period, as well as Devonian, Jurassic and Cretaceous rhyolite, with some granite and granodiorite intrusions.

== Geography ==
The Kongin Range rises in the central sector of the Kolyma Highlands system. The mountains are of moderate height, the highest summit of the range is a 1,486 metres (4,875 ft) high summit rising in the southern part. Certain sources give a height of 1,561 metres (5,121 ft).

The range is located in the interfluve of the Omolon, Kedon and Korkodon rivers. The Namyndykan (Намындыкан), a left tributary of the Omolon marks its northern limit, while the lower course of the Kedon and its left tributary Levaya Kedon limit the range to the east. To the west the range is limited by the Bulun and the Korkodon, while to the south it merges with the northern slopes of the Molkaty Range.

=== Hydrography ===
The Bulun, the longest tributary of the Korkodon, and its 156 kilometres (97 mi) long tributary Vizualnaya have their sources in the western slopes of the Kongin Range.

== Flora ==
On the slopes of the Kongin Range are there are sparse larch forests up to heights between 600 metres (2,000 ft) and 700 metres (2,300 ft). At higher elevations the only vegetation is mountain tundra. The barren high altitude zone is separated from the forest area by a belt of Siberian pine dwarf forest.

== See also ==
- List of mountains and hills of Russia
