= Kedon Range =

Mountain range in Russia

- Кедонский хребет
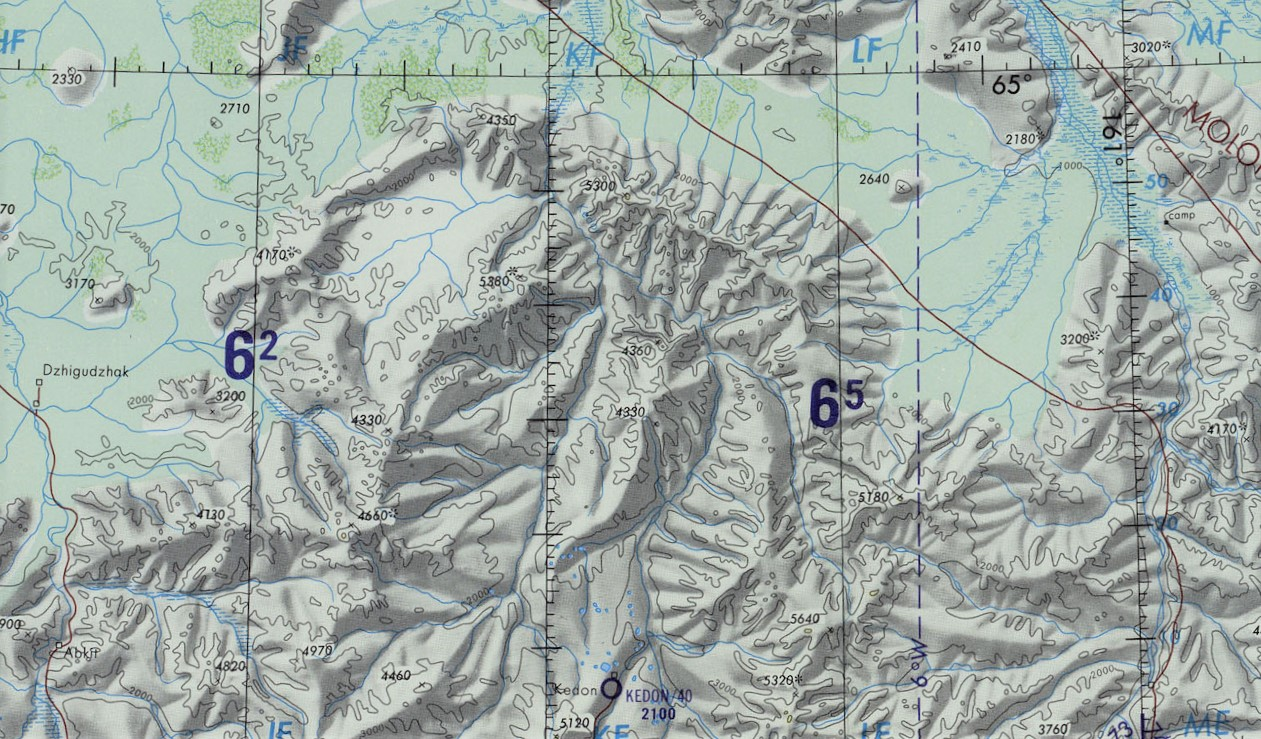
- Kedon Range, Central Kolyma Mountains, ONC map section

Highest point
- Peak: Unnamed
- Elevation: 1,661 m (5,449 ft)

Dimensions
- Length: 150 km (93 mi) NW/SE
- Width: 50 km (31 mi) NE/SW

Geography
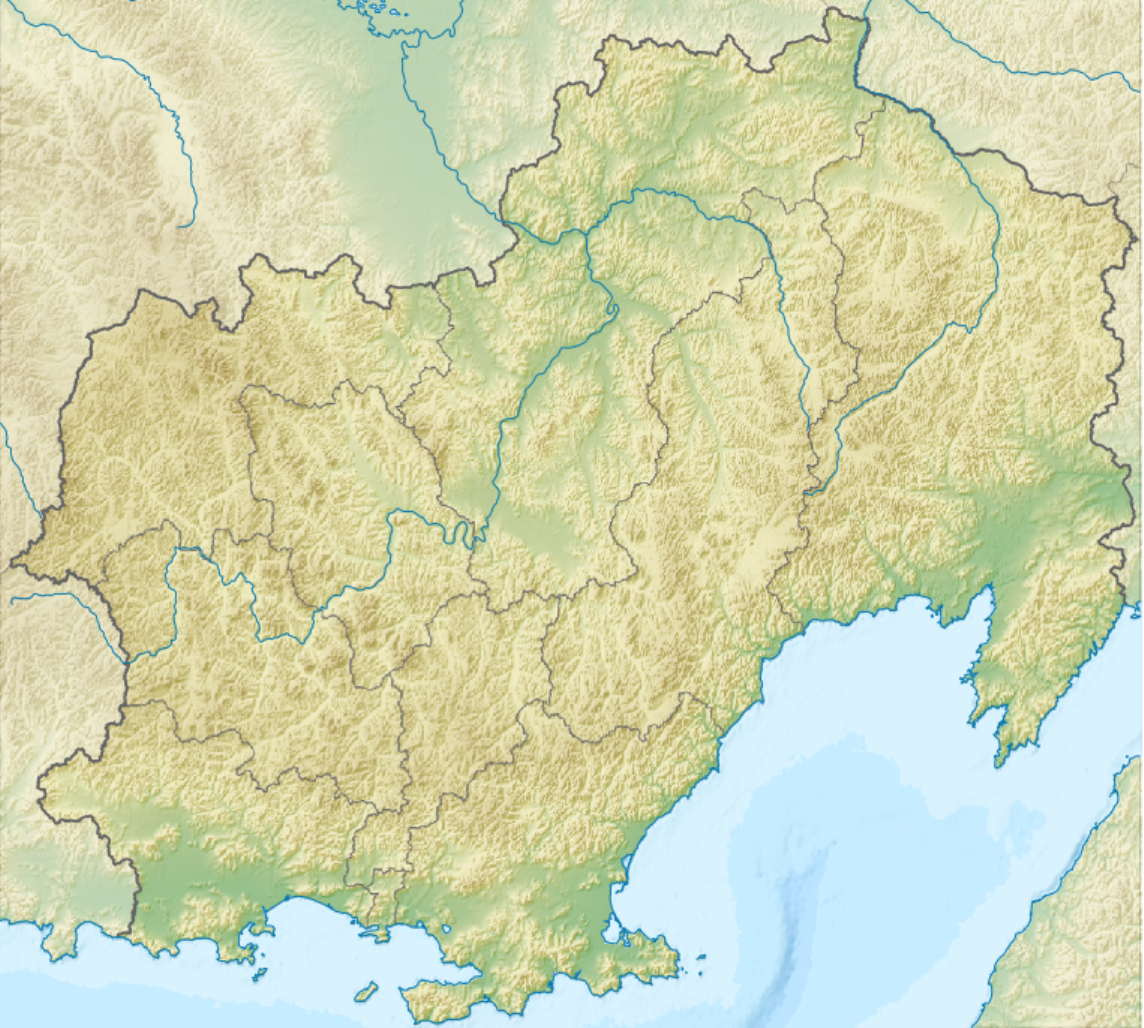
- Location within Far Eastern Federal District Location within Magadan Oblast
- Country: Russia
- Federal subject: Magadan Oblast
- District: Severo-Evensky District
- Range coordinates: 64°30′N 159°30′E
- Parent range: Kolyma Highlands, East Siberian System

Geology
- Orogeny: Alpine orogeny
- Rock age: Mesozoic

Climbing
- Easiest route: From Omolon

The Kedon Range (Russian: Кедонский хребет) is a mountain range in Magadan Oblast, Far Eastern Federal District, Russia.

The Kedon Range is separated from the other ranges of the Highlands by tectonic basins. The mountains are not very high and are dissected by numerous river valleys, mainly tributaries of the Kedon. The area of the range is uninhabited.

== History ==
Formerly there was a village in the southern area of the range where the Buksunda (Буксунда) reindeer-breeding state farm operated. It was located at 64°07′18″N 159°14′35″E by the left bank of the 42 kilometers (26 mi) long Tik river (Тик), a right tributary of the Kedon. The village had 115 inhabitants in 1984 but lost its population at the turn of the millennium. Now it lies abandoned.

== Geography ==
The Kedon Range rises in the central sector of the Kolyma Highlands system. The main ridge runs in an arch to the west and southwest of the course of the Omolon. It stretches from the south to the northwest for over 150 kilometers (93 mi) from the eastern end of the Molkaty Range in the south. The southern end is not clearly delimited, with the Kedon and Molkaty ranges merging with each other. To the west and northwest rises the Kongin Range. The highest mountain of the range is a 1,661 metres (5,449 ft) high peak located in the southern part of the range.

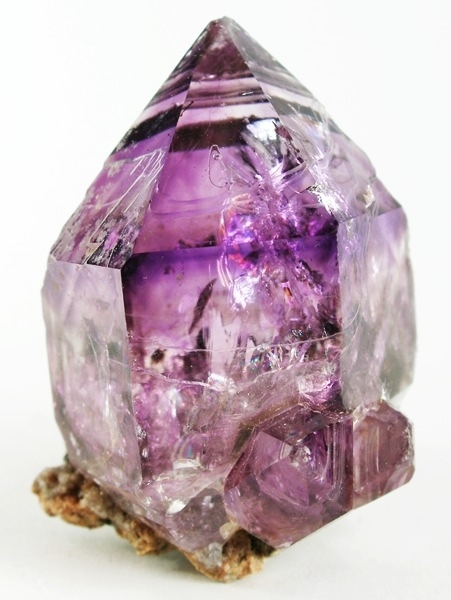
Amethyst of the Kedon Range area.

=== Hydrography ===
The 261 kilometers (162 mi) long Kedon river originates in the Molkaty Range to the south and cuts across the central area of the Kedon Range on its way northwards. Further upstream of its mouth many short left tributaries of the Omolon, such as the 117 kilometers (73 mi) long Pravaya Khulchan (Правый Хуличан) have their sources in the range.

== Flora ==
The slopes of the Kedon Range are bare and have a barren look. There are sparse larch forests in the valleys.

== See also ==
- List of mountains and hills of Russia
