= Kedon =

Kedon Кедон
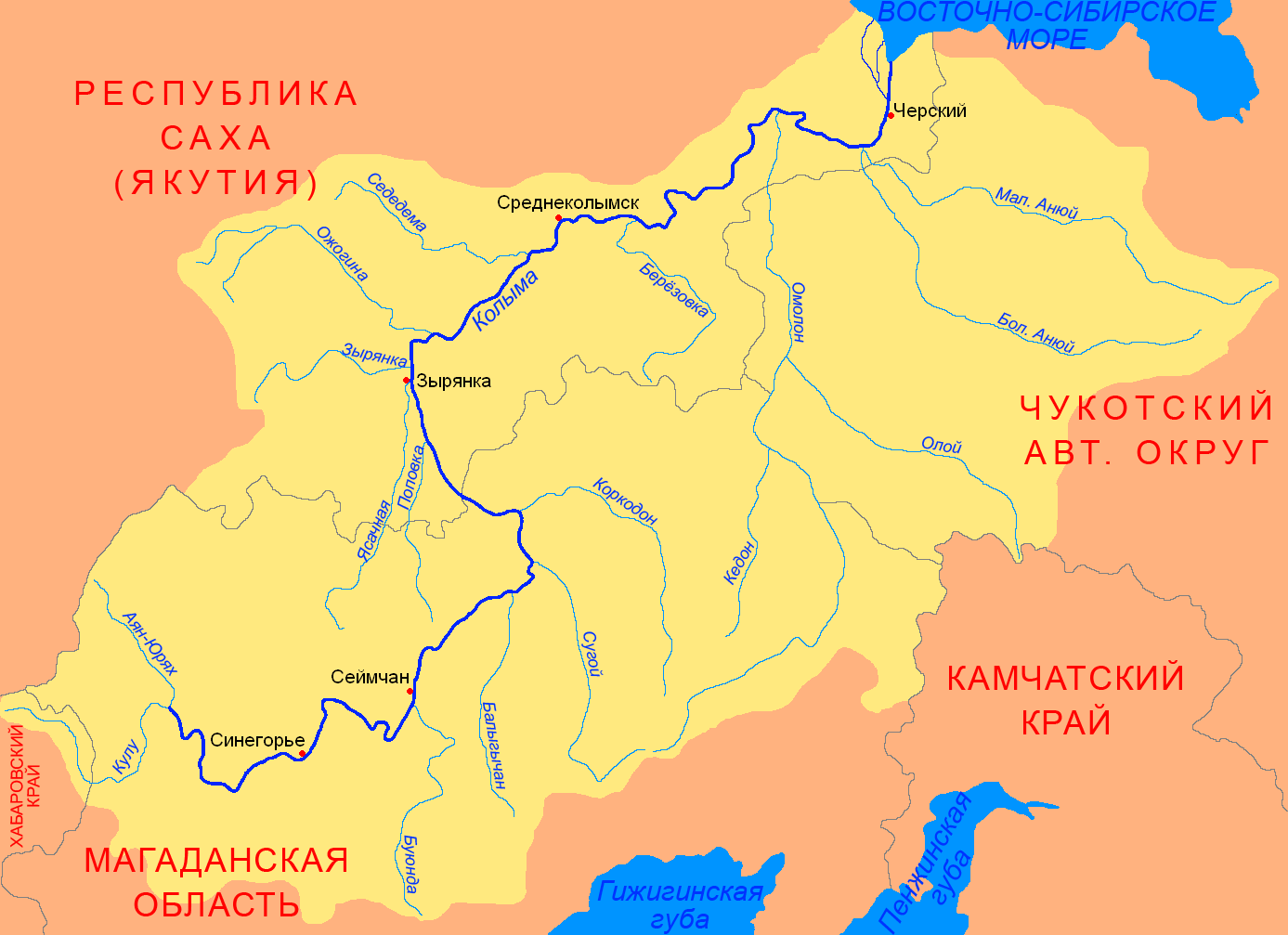
- Kolyma basin with the Kedon in the central part.

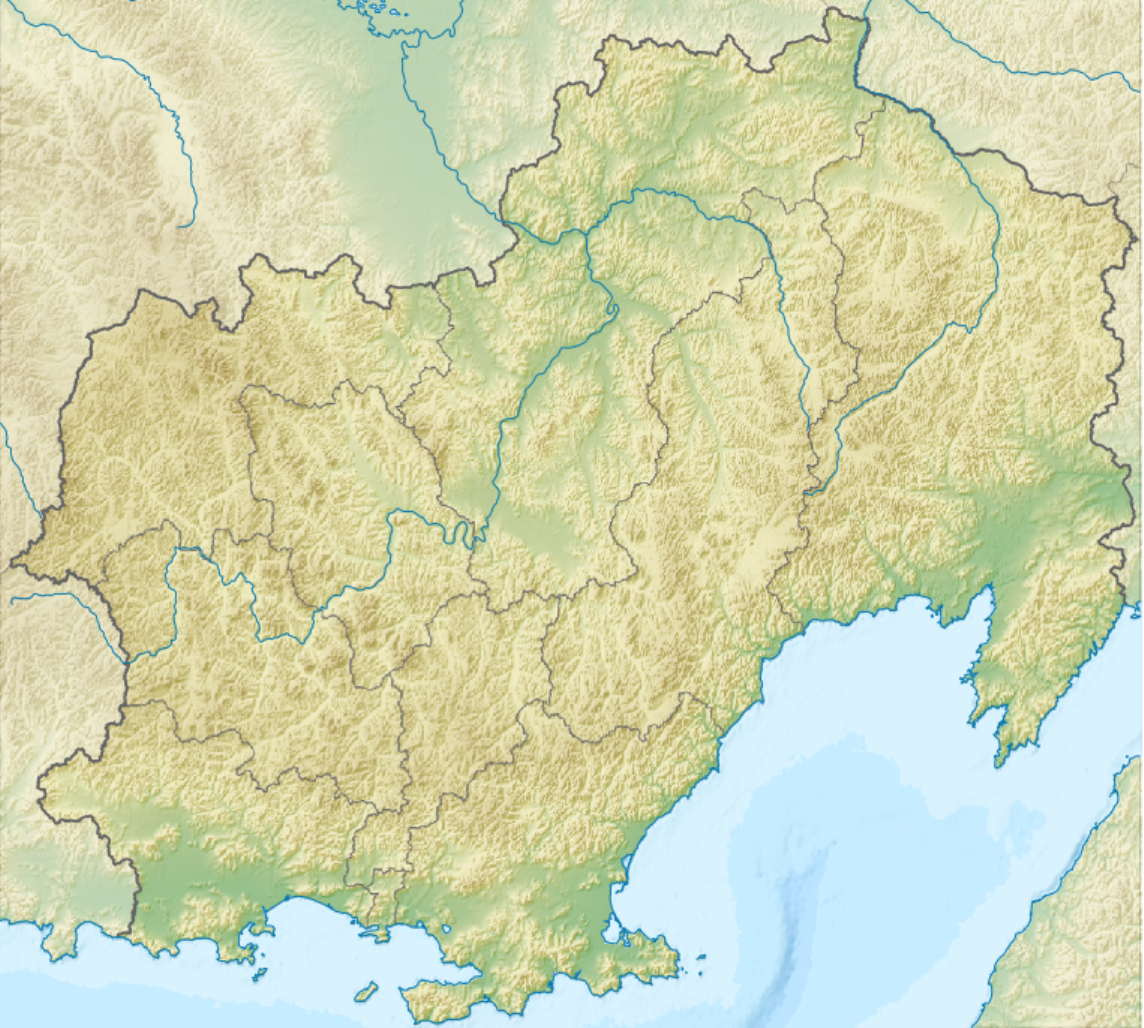
- Mouth location in Magadan Oblast, Russia

Location
- Country: Russia
- Federal subject: Magadan Oblast
- District: Severo-Evensky District

Physical characteristics
- Source
  - location: Molkaty Range; Kolyma Mountains
  - coordinates: 63°46′33″N 159°19′27″E
  - elevation: 824 m (2,703 ft)
- Mouth: Omolon
  - coordinates: 65°38′43″N 159°24′05″E
  - elevation: 200 m (656 ft)
- Length: 296 km (184 mi)
- Basin size: 10,300 km^{2} (4,000 sq mi)

Basin features
- Progression: Omolon → Kolyma→ East Siberian Sea

The Kedon (Russian: Кедон) is a river in Magadan Oblast, Russia. It has a length of 296 kilometres (184 mi) and a drainage basin of 10,300 square kilometres (4,000 mi^{2}).

The Kedon is a left tributary of the Omolon, of the Kolyma basin. The river flows steadily northwards across an uninhabited area of the Kolyma Mountains. The nearest village is Omolon, located upstream of its mouth. The name of the river originated in the Yukaghir language.

== Course ==
The source of the Kedon is in the northern slopes of the Molkaty Range. The river flows in a steady northern direction until its mouth. It heads across mountainous terrain and crosses the Kedon Range, dividing into multiple branches. It is bound by mountains on both sides, with the Kongin Range to the west in its lower course, until it reaches the Omolon floodplain, where there are swamps and lakes and where it is joined by the Burgachan from the right. 1,437 m (4,715 ft) high Mt Golaya rises to the right of the final stretch. Shortly thereafter it joins the left bank of the Omolon 499 kilometres (310 mi) from its mouth, near the border of the Chukotka Autonomous Okrug.

The main tributaries of the Kedon are the 122 kilometres (76 mi) long Omkuchan and 153 kilometres (95 mi) long Levaya Kedon from the left, as well as the 85 kilometres (53 mi) long Novaya, 63 kilometres (39 mi) long Tumannaya and 84 kilometres (52 mi) long Burgachan from the right.

== See also ==
- List of rivers of Russia
