= Severo-Evensk Airport =

Severo-Evensk Airport Аэропорт Северо-Эвенск
- IATA: SWV; ICAO: UHMW

Summary
- Airport type: Public
- Serves: Evensk, Severo-Evensky District, Magadan Oblast, Russia
- Coordinates: 61°55′28″N 159°13′52″E

Maps
- Magadan Oblast in Russia

- Location of the airport in the Magadan Oblast

Runways
Direction	Length		Surface
Direction	m	ft	Surface
03/21	1,600	5,249	Gravel
- Source: DAFIF, STV

Severo-Evensk Airport (IATA: SWV, ICAO: UHMW) is an airport serving and located 1 kilometre (0.62 mi) northwest of Evensk in Severo-Evensky District, Magadan Oblast, Russia. It is a small engineered airfield with concrete parking area. It handles small transport aircraft.

== Airlines and destinations ==
Airlines	Destinations
IrAero	Magadan

== See also ==
- List of airports in Russia
