= Korkodon =

Korkodon Коркодон / Коркигэ
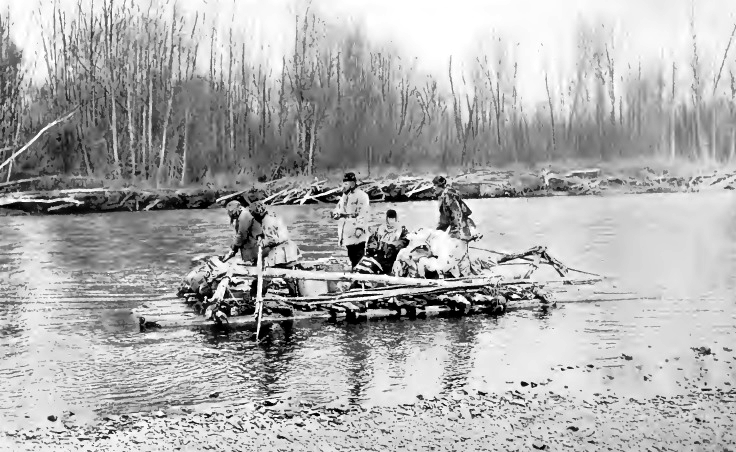

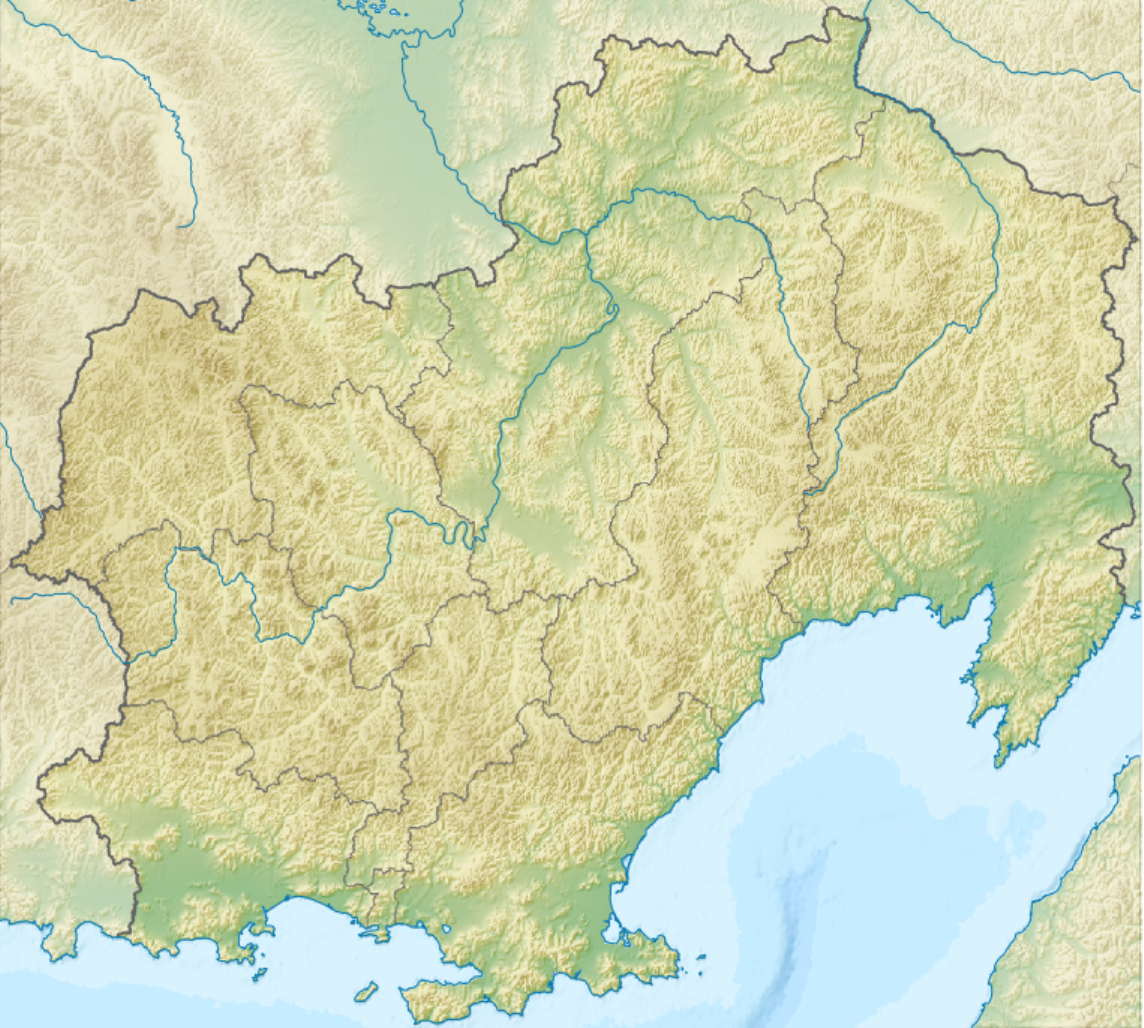
- Mouth location in Magadan Oblast, Russia

Location
- Country: Magadan Oblast, Russia

Physical characteristics
- Source
  - location: Korkodon Range; Kolyma Mountains
  - coordinates: 63°11′48″N 157°34′51″E
- Mouth: Kolyma
  - coordinates: 64°43′50″N 153°58′22″E
  - elevation: 93 m (305 ft)
- Length: 476 km (296 mi)
- Basin size: 42,800 km^{2} (16,500 sq mi)
- Discharge
  - average: 51.3 m^{3}/s (1,810 cu ft/s)

Basin features
- Progression: Kolyma→ East Siberian Sea

The Korkodon (Russian: Коркодон; Northern Yukaghir: Коркигэ) is a river in Magadan Oblast, Russian Far East. It is a right tributary of the Kolyma, with a length of 476 kilometres (296 mi) a drainage basin of 42,800 square kilometres (16,500 mi^{2}). The upper reaches of the river are in Omsukchansky District, then it flows across the Srednekansky District in its lower course. The name of the river originated in the Northern Yukaghir language.

The Korkodon basin is a desolate area; there are no settlements, but since the lower reaches of the river are navigable; timber rafting was carried out in the 20th century.

== Course ==
The Korkodon is the fifth longest tributary of the Kolyma and the third in basin area. It has its sources in the Korkodon Range of the Kolyma Mountains. It heads first roughly northwards within a swampy valley between the Korkodon Range to the west and the Molkaty and Kongin ranges to the east. Halfway through its course it bends and flows west and then southwestwards, fringing the Yukaghir Highlands. In its lower course it meanders and flows through a wide flat valley. Finally the river joins the right bank of the Kolyma 1,228 km (763 mi) from its mouth at an elevation of 93 m (305 ft).

The Korkodon has some very long tributaries. The most important ones are the 428 kilometres (266 mi) long Bulun and the 239 kilometres (149 mi) long Bolshoy Yarkodon from the right; and the 208 kilometres (129 mi) long Pungali and the 156 kilometres (97 mi) long Biliriken from the left. There are over 1,100 lakes in the Korkodon basin, most of them of the thermokarst type (alas), as well as swamps. The river freezes between mid October and mid May, but polynyas may form in the lower reaches.

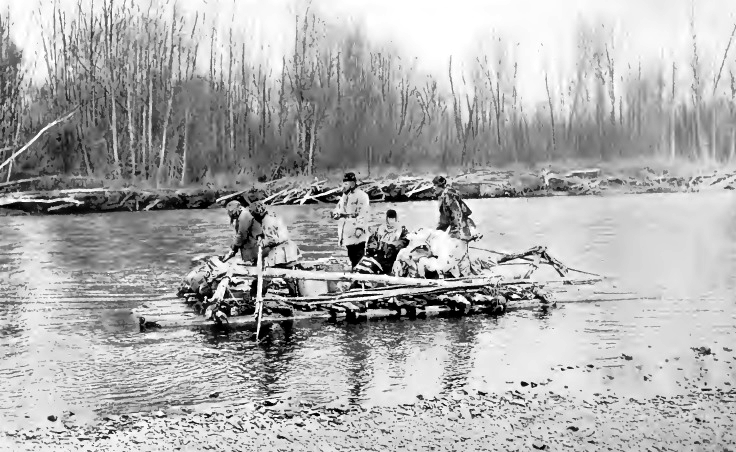
Russian ethnographer Vladimir Jochelson (1855 - 1937) on a raft in the Korkodon during the Jesup Expedition.

== Fauna ==
Among the fish species found in the river Arctic char, pike, sucker, lenok and whitefish deserve mention.

== See also ==
- List of rivers of Russia
