= Bulun (river) =

Bulun Булун
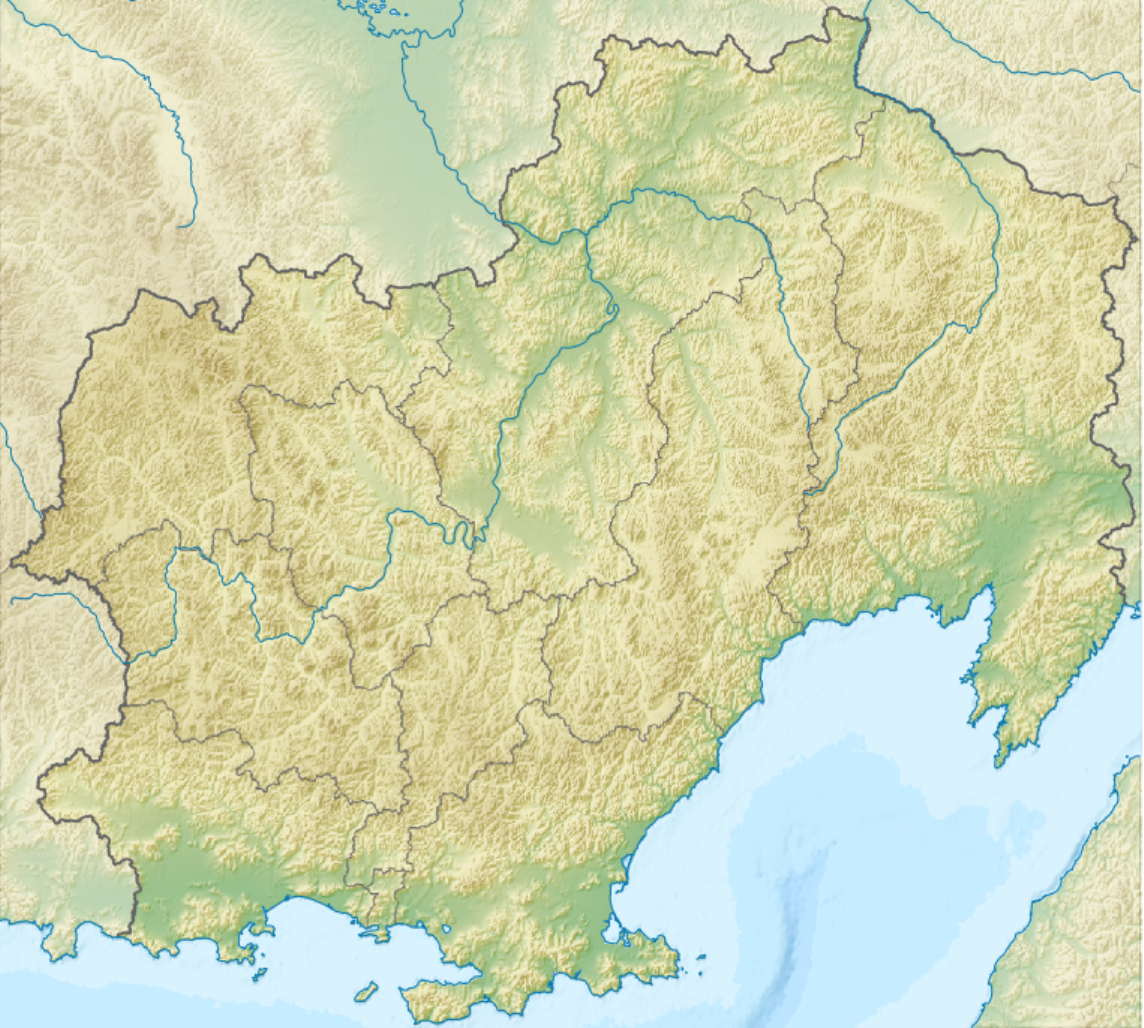
- Mouth location in Magadan Oblast, Russia

Location
- Country: Russia
- Federal subject: Magadan Oblast
- District: Severo-Evensky District, Omsukchansky District

Physical characteristics
- Source
  - location: Kongin Range; Kolyma Mountains
  - coordinates: 64°43′30″N 157°43′59″E
  - elevation: 447 m (1,467 ft)
- Mouth: Korkodon
  - coordinates: 65°03′49″N 154°51′55″E
  - elevation: 125 m (410 ft)
- Length: 428 km (266 mi)
- Basin size: 17,000 km^{2} (6,600 sq mi)

Basin features
- Progression: Korkodon → Kolyma→ East Siberian Sea

The Bulun (Russian: Булун), also known as "Rassokha", is a river in Magadan Oblast, Russia. It has a length of 428 kilometres (266 mi) and a drainage basin of 17,000 square kilometres (6,600 mi^{2}). The Bulun is the longest tributary of the Korkodon, of the Kolyma basin. Its river basin is located in a discontinuous permafrost zone.

The river flows across an uninhabited area of the Kolyma Mountains. Formerly there was a gold-mining settlement in its basin named Rassokha, but it was abandoned in the 1970s.

== Course ==
The Bulun is a right tributary of the Korkodon. Its source is in a small lake of the western slopes of the Kongin Range. The river flows first in a northern direction, bending towards the northwest. As it leaves the mountainous area, it bends towards the southwest in a floodplain fringing the southern side of the Yukaghir Highlands. The river flows slowly in its last stretch meandering strongly and the floodplain becomes wider, with swamps and oxbow lakes. There are also numerous small thermokarst lakes. At last the Bulun joins the right bank of the Korkodon 91 kilometres (57 mi) from its mouth.

The main tributaries of the Bulun are the 156 kilometres (97 mi) long Vizualnaya, the 132 kilometres (82 mi) long Nenkal and the 254 kilometres (158 mi) long Aly-Yuryakh from the right, as well as the 73 kilometres (45 mi) long Nelgyu from the left. The river is frozen between early October and late May. There is a winter road running along the left bank.

== See also ==
- List of rivers of Russia
