= Buyunda =

Buyunda Буюнда
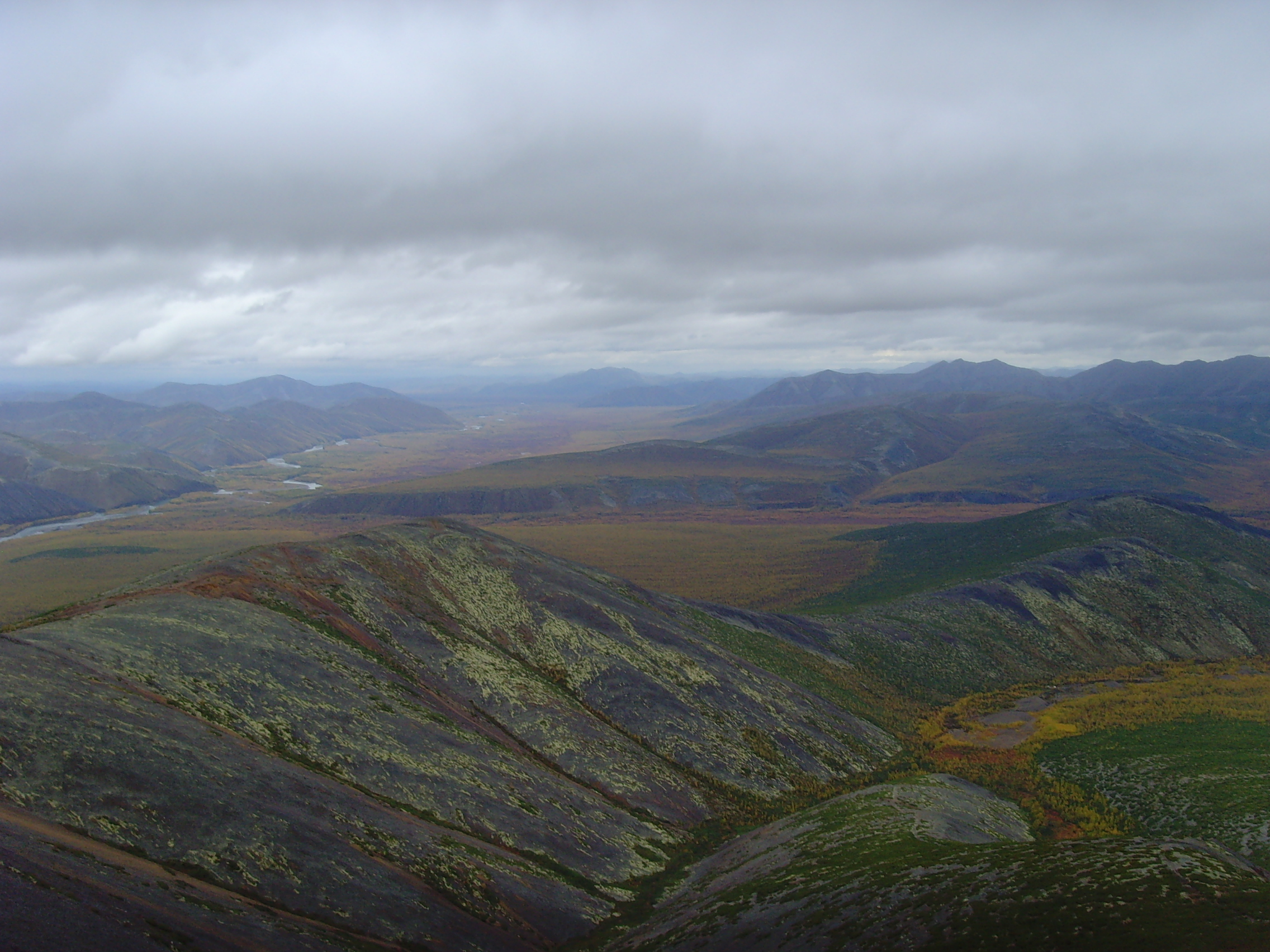
- Buyunda valley

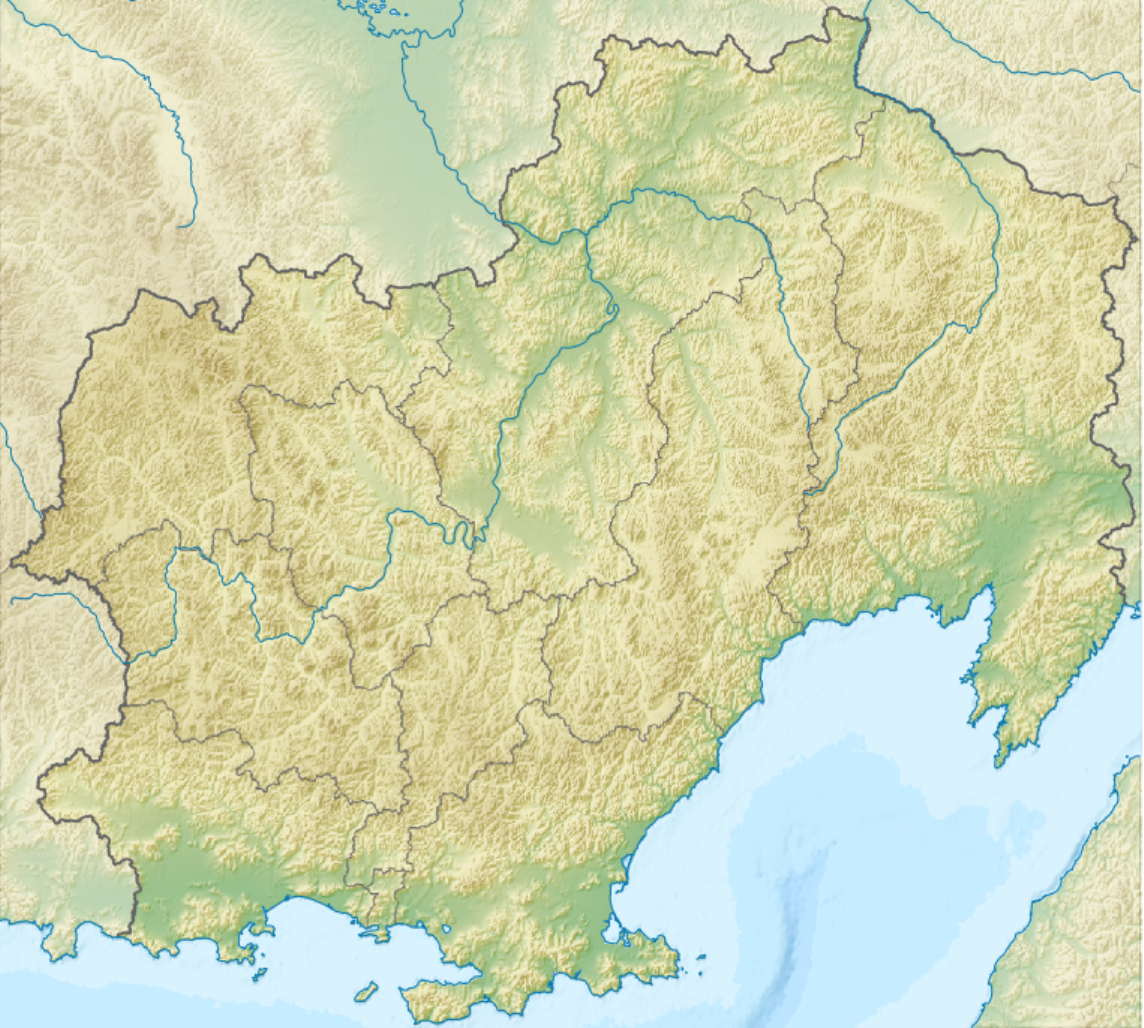
- Mouth location in Magadan Oblast, Russia

Location
- Country: Magadan Oblast, Russia

Physical characteristics
- Source
  - location: Kilgan Massif; Kolyma Mountains
  - coordinates: 60°51′55″N 153°33′59″E
  - elevation: 1,778 m (5,833 ft)
- Mouth: Kolyma
  - coordinates: 62°45′40″N 152°34′30″E
- Length: 434 km (270 mi)
- Basin size: 24,800 km^{2} (9,600 sq mi)
- Discharge
  - average: 215 m^{3}/s (7,600 cu ft/s)

Basin features
- Progression: Kolyma→ East Siberian Sea

The Buyunda (Russian: Буюнда) is a river in Magadan Oblast, Russian Far East. It is a right tributary of the Kolyma, with a length of 434 kilometres (270 mi) and a drainage basin of 24,800 square kilometres (9,600 mi^{2}).

Together with the Seymchan that flows roughly southwards on the facing bank of the Kolyma basin, the Buyunda forms the Seymchan-Buyunda Depression, which limits the Upper Kolyma Highlands from the east.

The name of the Buyunda originated in the Evenki language, meaning "where there are wild deer".

== Course ==
The Buyunda is the seventh longest tributary of the Kolyma. It has its sources in the Kilgan Massif and heads roughly northwards across the mountainous area of the Maymandzhin Range. After entering the depression it meanders strongly across a wide and marshy floodplain, its main channel dividing into branches. Finally the river joins the right bank of the Kolyma 1,573 km (977 mi) from its mouth. Its confluence with the Kolyma is 100 km (62 mi) below the Ust-Srednekan Hydroelectric Station. Seymchan settlement and the mouth of river Seymchan are located further downstream on the facing bank.

The river is frozen between late October and late May. The main tributaries of the Buyunda are the Bolshaya, Kupka, and lower Elgen from the right and the upper Elgen, Talaya, Khurchan, and Gerba from the left. There are over 1,550 lakes in the basin of the river.

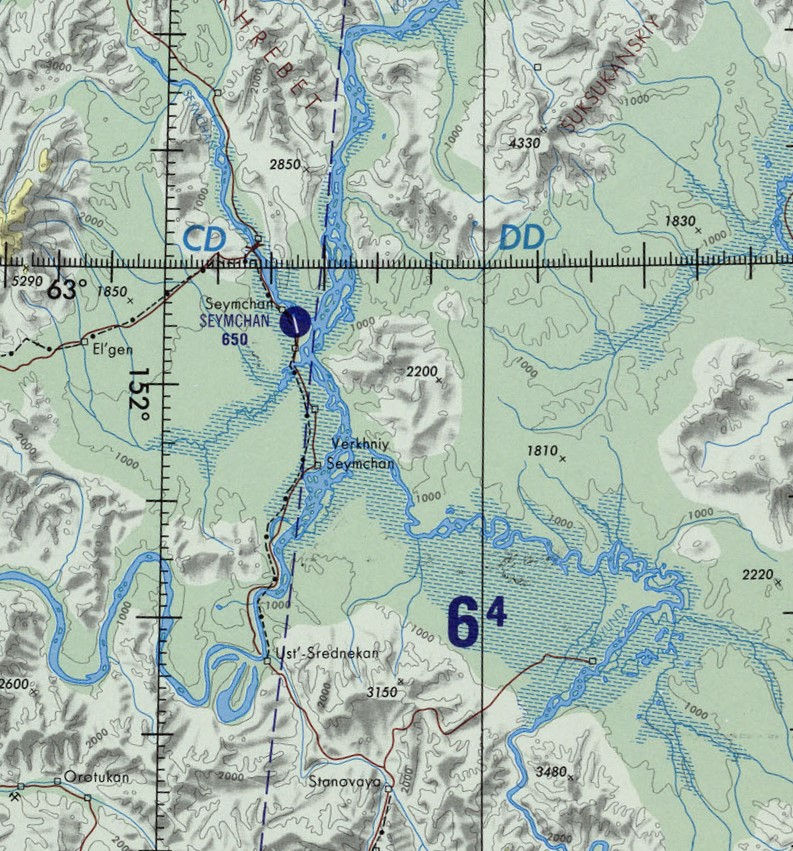
Seymchan-Buyunda Depression map section with the Buyunda river in the lower right.

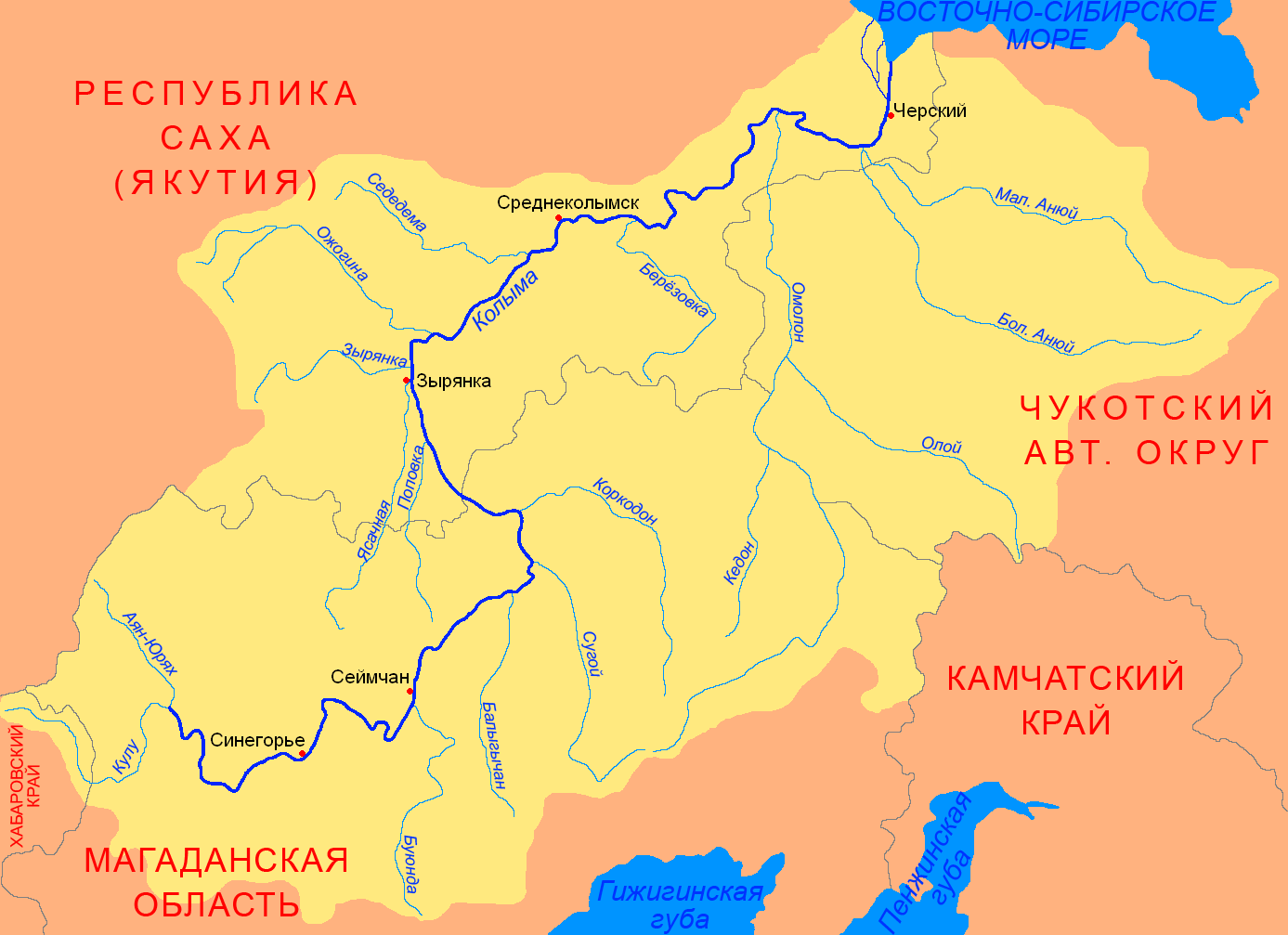
Basin of the Kolyma, with the Buyunda at the bottom end.

== Fauna ==
Loach, grayling, whitefish, burbot, and lenok are the main fish species found in the waters of the Buyunda.

== See also ==
- List of rivers of Russia
