= Evensk =

Evensk Эвенск
- Urban-type settlement
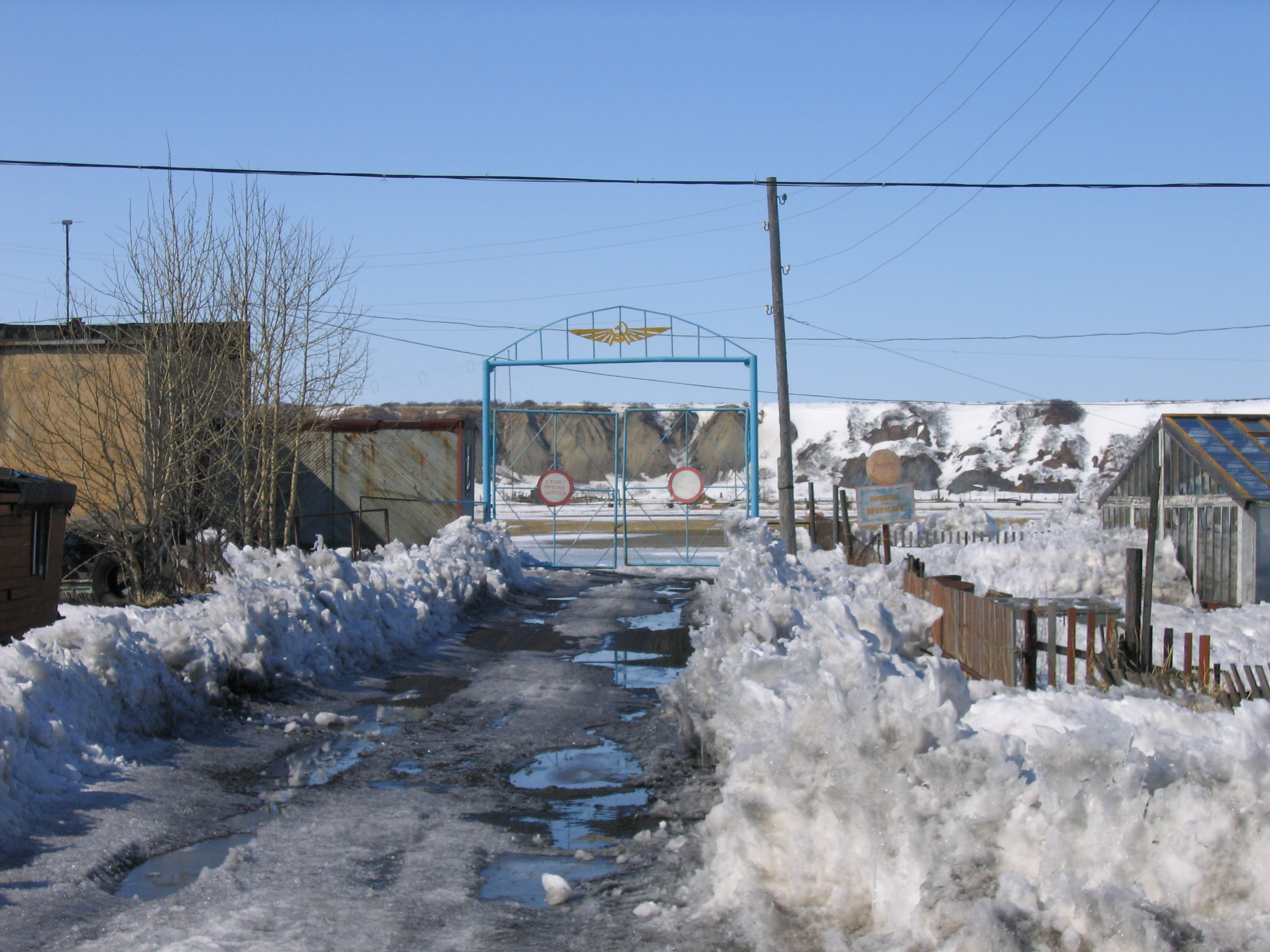
- Severo-Evensk Airport
- Interactive map of Evensk
- Location of Evensk Evensk (Magadan Oblast)
- Coordinates: 61°55′01″N 159°13′59″E
- Country: Russia
- Federal subject: Magadan Oblast
- Administrative district: Severo-Evensky District

Population (2010 Census)
  - Total: 1,567
  - Estimate (1 January 2017): 1,471 (−6.1%)
- Time zone: UTC+11 (MSK+8)
- Postal code: 686430
- OKTMO ID: 44707000051

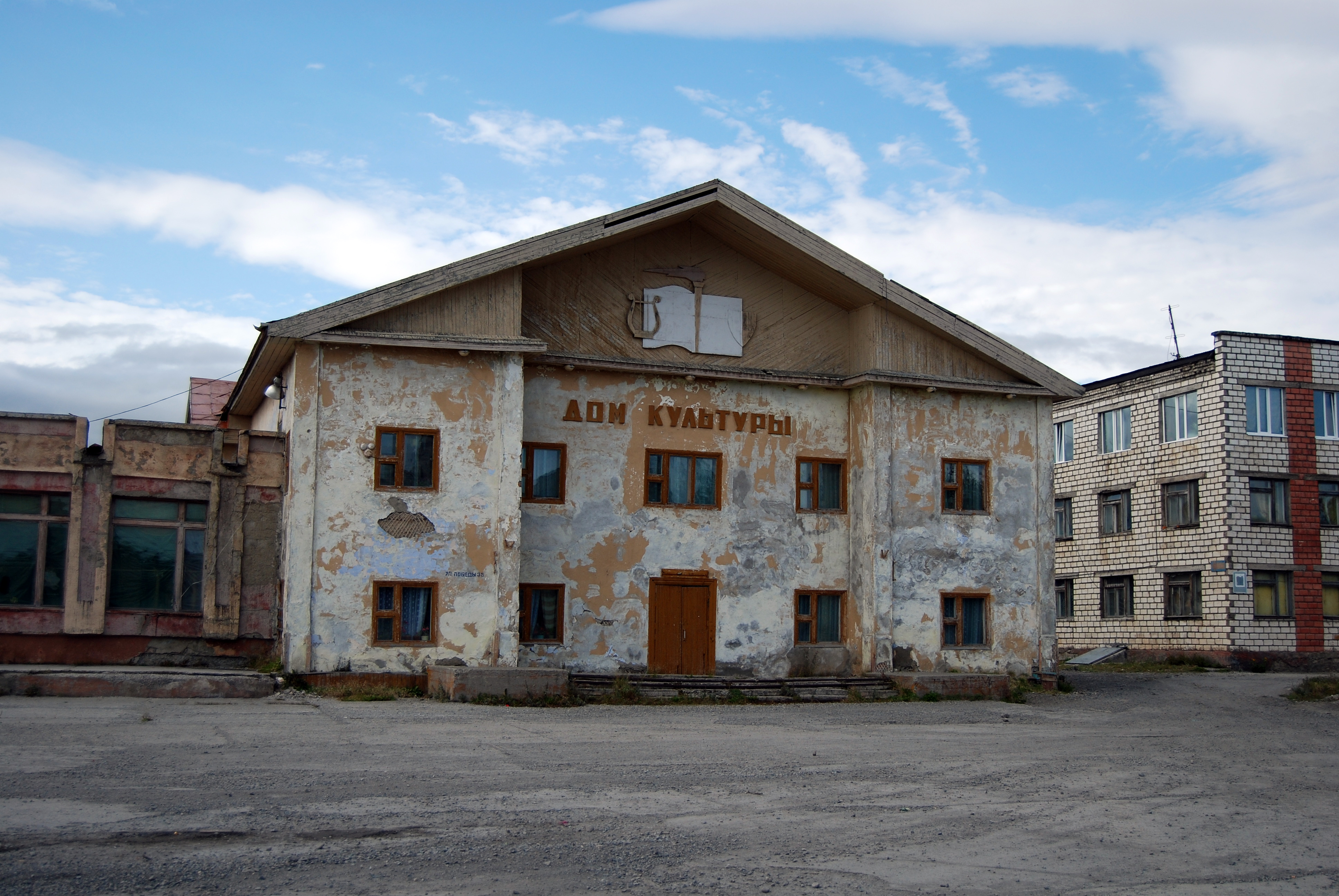
Evensk, 2008

Evensk (Russian: Эвенск) is an urban-type settlement in the Severo-Evensky District, Magadan Oblast, Russia. As of 2016, it has a population of 1567.

== Geography ==
The village is located by the seashore in Gizhigin Bay of the Sea of Okhotsk.

== Climate ==
Evensk has a cold subarctic climate (Köppen climate classification Dfc), with very cold, snowy winters and rather cool, short summers. Precipitation is quite high compared to interior Siberia, and somewhat higher in summer than at other times of the year. Climate data was taken from nearby settlement of Nayakhan.

Climate data for Evensk/Nayakhan
Month	Jan	Feb	Mar	Apr	May	Jun	Jul	Aug	Sep	Oct	Nov	Dec	Year
Record high °C (°F)	3.9 (39.0)	5.0 (41.0)	5.0 (41.0)	7.6 (45.7)	19.8 (67.6)	28.0 (82.4)	30.0 (86.0)	27.2 (81.0)	23.9 (75.0)	12.2 (54.0)	10.0 (50.0)	3.9 (39.0)	30.0 (86.0)
Mean daily maximum °C (°F)	−14.4 (6.1)	−13.7 (7.3)	−10.4 (13.3)	−3.8 (25.2)	4.9 (40.8)	12.0 (53.6)	15.1 (59.2)	15.1 (59.2)	10.2 (50.4)	−0.4 (31.3)	−10.1 (13.8)	−14.5 (5.9)	−0.8 (30.5)
Daily mean °C (°F)	−17.8 (0.0)	−17.4 (0.7)	−14.8 (5.4)	−8.4 (16.9)	1.2 (34.2)	7.6 (45.7)	11.0 (51.8)	10.7 (51.3)	5.7 (42.3)	−4.3 (24.3)	−13.4 (7.9)	−17.8 (0.0)	−4.8 (23.4)
Mean daily minimum °C (°F)	−21.2 (−6.2)	−21.2 (−6.2)	−19.2 (−2.6)	−12.9 (8.8)	−2.6 (27.3)	3.1 (37.6)	6.8 (44.2)	6.2 (43.2)	1.1 (34.0)	−8.1 (17.4)	−16.7 (1.9)	−21.1 (−6.0)	−8.8 (16.1)
Record low °C (°F)	−42.0 (−43.6)	−38.9 (−38.0)	−36.0 (−32.8)	−29.0 (−20.2)	−20.0 (−4.0)	−5.0 (23.0)	−0.6 (30.9)	−8.9 (16.0)	−8.9 (16.0)	−24.0 (−11.2)	−35.5 (−31.9)	−42.0 (−43.6)	−42.0 (−43.6)
Average precipitation mm (inches)	34.8 (1.37)	21.5 (0.85)	30.1 (1.19)	34.7 (1.37)	72.7 (2.86)	94.1 (3.70)	68.4 (2.69)	86.3 (3.40)	66.1 (2.60)	71.7 (2.82)	50.1 (1.97)	29.0 (1.14)	659.5 (25.96)
Average precipitation days (≥ 1 mm)	5.5	4.7	4.3	5.7	6.1	7.2	8.9	8.5	6.4	7.0	6.2	4.5	75
Source: climatebase.ru

== See also ==
- Severo-Evensk Airport
