= Namyndykan =

River in Russia

Namyndykan Намындыкан
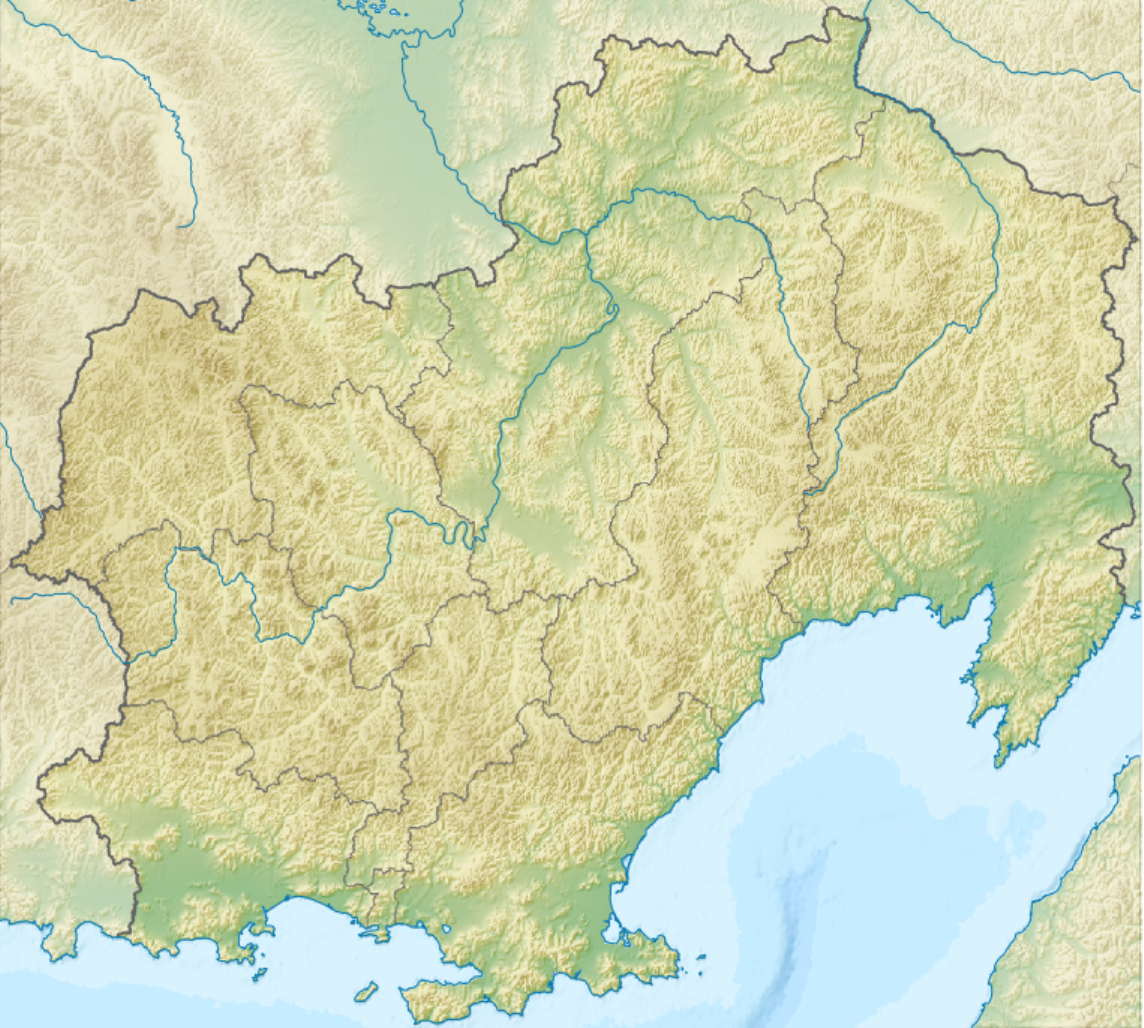
- Mouth location in Magadan Oblast, Russia

Location
- Country: Russia
- Federal subject: Magadan Oblast
- District: Srednekansky District

Physical characteristics
- Source
  - location: Kongin Range; Kolyma Mountains
- Mouth: Omolon
  - coordinates: 65°48′07.2″N 158°53′53.3″E
- Length: 199 km (124 mi)
- Basin size: 2,410 km^{2} (930 sq mi)

Basin features
- Progression: Omolon → Kolyma→ East Siberian Sea

The Namyndykan (Russian: Намындыкан) is a river in Magadan Oblast, Russia. It has a length of 199 kilometres (124 mi) and a drainage basin of 2,410 square kilometres (930 mi^{2}).

The Namyndykan is a left tributary of the middle course of the Omolon, Kolyma basin. The nearest village is Omolon, located to the east of its mouth. The basin of the river is a protected area.

== Course ==
The source of the Namyndykan is in the northern end of the Kongin Range of the Kolyma Mountains, by the southern limit of the Yukaghir Highlands. The river heads across an uninhabited area and flows roughly eastwards until its mouth. Towards its middle course the river meanders strongly in a floodplain where there are swamps and lakes. Some of the lakes are quite large, such as the Krokhalin Lakes (Крохалиные озера) north of the river channel. In its last stretch the Namyndykan reaches the Omolon floodplain where it bends northeastwards before the confluence.

The Namyndykan joins the left bank of the Omolon in the area where the great river makes a bend northwards. The confluence is 466 kilometres (290 mi) from the mouth of the Omolon, near the border of the Chukotka Autonomous Okrug.

The Namyndykan has 19 tributaries longer than 10 kilometres (6.2 mi). The main tributaries are the 39 kilometres (24 mi) long Neproydennyy and the 33 kilometres (21 mi) long Snezhnyy from the right, as well as the 48 kilometres (30 mi) long Vechernyaya and 35 kilometres (22 mi) long Silny from the left.

== See also ==
- List of rivers of Russia
