= Margareta Ivănuș =

Moldovan singer (1949–2025)

Margareta Ivănuș (13 September 1949 – 24 August 2025) was a Moldovan singer.

== Life and career ==
Ivănuș was born 13 September 1949 in Seymchan, Russian SFSR. She graduated from the "N. F. Sokolovski" School of Music in Gomel, Byelorussian SSR (now the College of Arts) in 1971. After graduation, she took a job as a soloist at the Philharmonic in the same city.

She relocated to the Moldavian SSR in 1976. Until 1977 she was a soloist in the orchestra of the folk dance ensemble "Joc", after which she sang in the "Ensemble for the Propagation of Music" (1977–1986), the bands "Orizont" (1977) and "Rapsodia" (1985-1986) of the Chisinau Philharmonic. She collaborated with composers Eugen Doga, Constantin Rusnac, Gheorghe Mustea, Dumitru Gheorghiță, Arkady Luxemburg, S. Lîsoi, A. Sokirianski, I. Duca, E. Ionescu and others.

She won the Grand Prize at the "Golden Chrysanthemum" romance festival-contest in 1992. In 1984 she was decorated with the title "Emeritus Artist of the MSSR", and in 1999, she was decorated with the Order of the Republic by President Petru Lucinschi.

Ivănuș died 24 August 2025, at the age of 75.
