= Mount Chubukulakh =

Mountain in the Sakha Republic, Russia

Mount Chubukulakh Гора Чубукулах
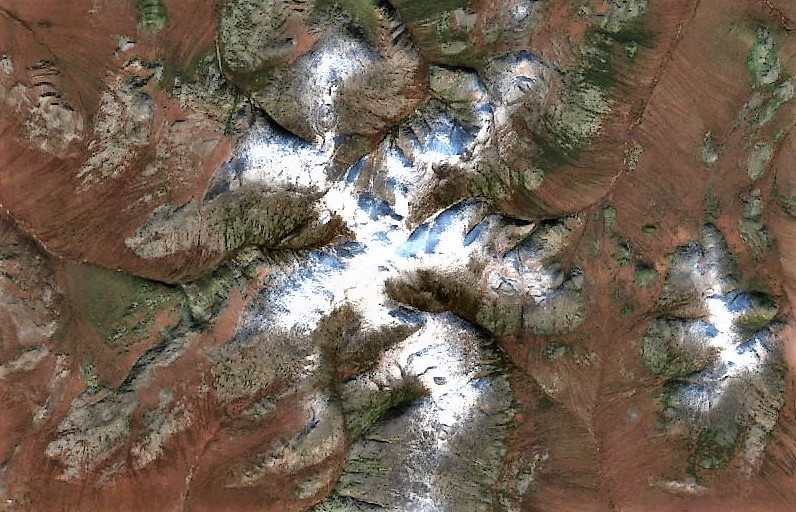
- Chubukulakh Sentinel-2 image

Highest point
- Elevation: 1,128 m (3,701 ft)
- Coordinates: 66°25′22″N 153°42′02″E

Geography
- Location within Sakha Republic
- Location: Sakha Republic, Russia
- Parent range: Chubukulakh Range; Yukaghir Highlands

Mount Chubukulakh (Russian: Гора Чубукулах) is a mountain in the Middle Kolyma District, Sakha Republic (Yakutia), Russia. At 1,128 m (3,701 ft), it is the highest summit in the Yukaghir Highlands, a mountainous area of moderate height part of the East Siberian System.

Mount Chubukulakh is located in the Chubukulakh Range, in the central part of the Yukaghir Highlands, a desolate area of the eastern limits of Yakutia, close to the border with Magadan Oblast.

== See also ==
- List of mountains and hills of Russia
