= Ango (river) =

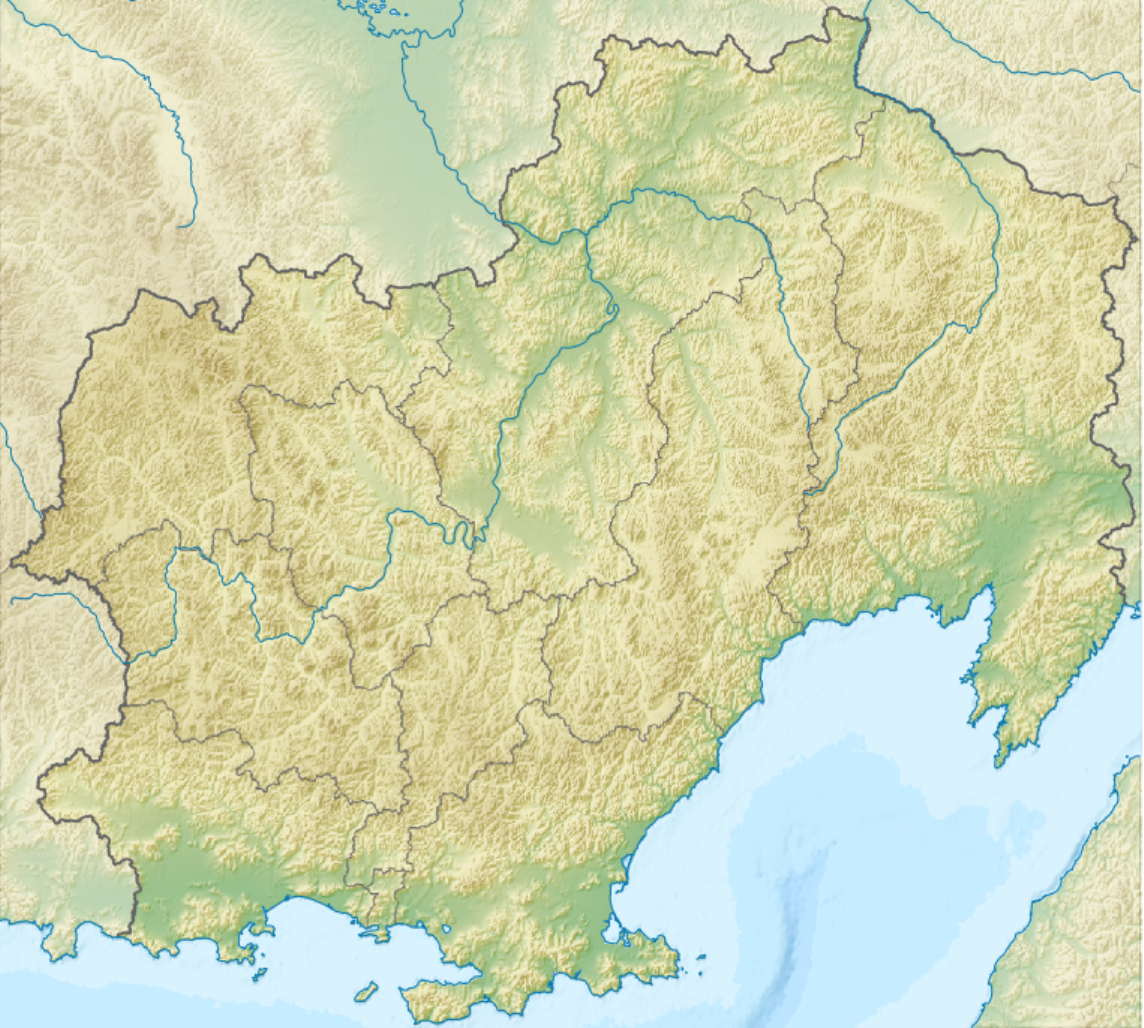
- Mouth location in Magadan Oblast, Russia

Location
- Country: Russia

Physical characteristics
- Mouth: Omolon
  - coordinates: 63.2643°N 158.2868°E
- Length: 25 km (16 mi)

Basin features
- Progression: Omolon→ Kolyma→ East Siberian Sea

The Ango (Russian: Анго) is a tributary of the Omolon in Russia's Magadan Oblast in northeast Siberia. It is Omolons right tributary and flows into it 990 kilometres (620 mi) from its mouth. The length of the Ango is 25 kilometres (16 mi). Its name comes from an Even word Anu, meaning willow.

== See also ==
- List of rivers of Russia
