= Seymchan (Kolyma) =

River in Sakha Republic, Russia

Seymchan Сеймчан
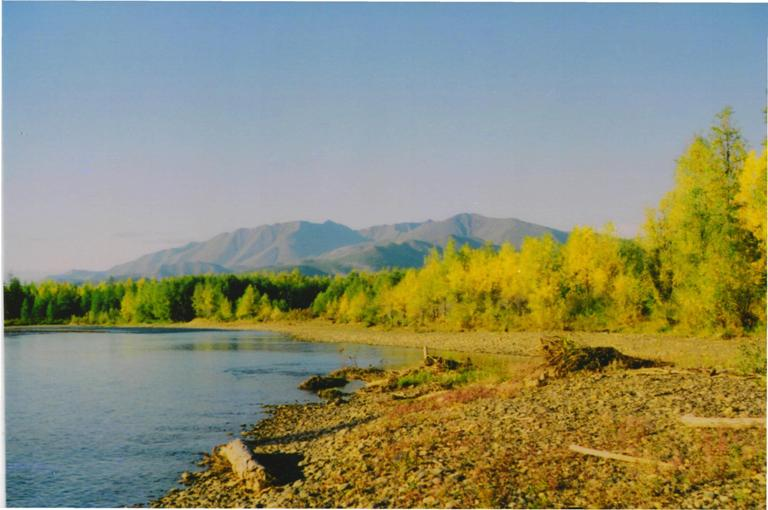
- View of the river

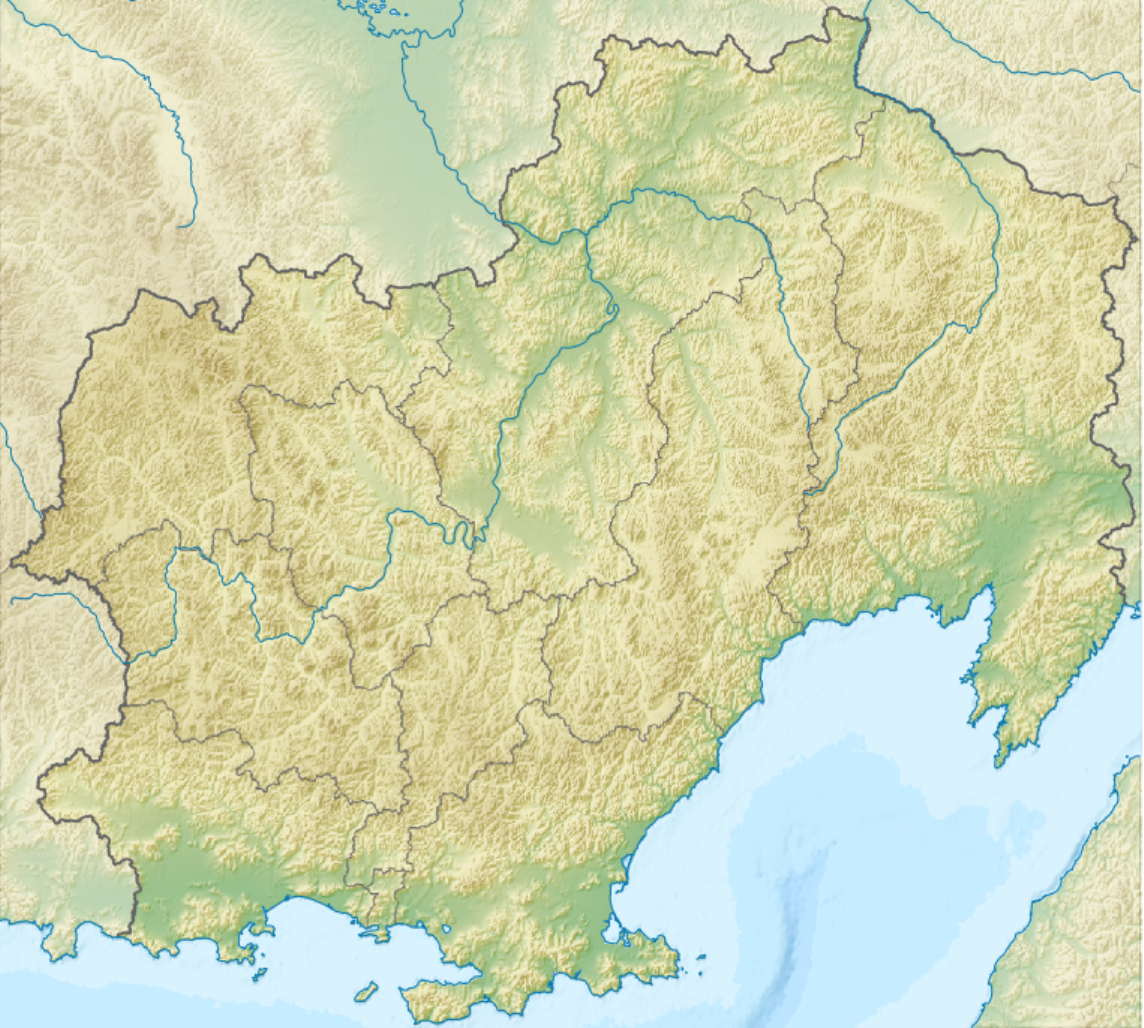
- Mouth location in Magadan Oblast, Russia

Location
- Country: Magadan Oblast, Russia

Physical characteristics
- Source
  - location: Confluence of Left Seymchan and Right Seymchan; Upper Kolyma Highlands
  - coordinates: 63.986667°N 154.244722°E
- Mouth: Kolyma
  - location: Near Seymchan
  - coordinates: 62°55′17″N 152°28′04″E
- Length: 158 km (98 mi)
- Basin size: 3,600 km^{2} (1,400 sq mi)
- Discharge
  - average: 35.24 m^{3}/s (1,244 cu ft/s)

Basin features
- Progression: Kolyma→ East Siberian Sea

The Seymchan (Russian: Сеймчан) is a river in Srednekansky District, Magadan Oblast, Russia. It is a left tributary of the Kolyma, with a length of 158 kilometres (98 mi) a drainage basin of 3,600 square kilometres (1,400 mi^{2}).

The name comes from the Yakut language word Kheymchen, which is an area of open water surrounded by sea ice.

== Course ==
The river rises in the Upper Kolyma Highlands, eastern limits of the Chersky Range, at the confluence of Left Seymchan and Right Seymchan. It flows first in a northeast direction, bending along its course until it flows in a southeastern direction. Finally it meets the Kolyma near Seymchan, 158 km (98 mi) from its mouth, downstream from the mouth of the Buyunda on the opposite bank.

Together with the Buyunda that flows roughly northwards on the other side of the Kolyma basin, the Seymchan forms the Seymchan-Buyunda Depression, which limits the Upper Kolyma Highlands from the east.

Its main tributaries are the Medvezhya and the Verina.

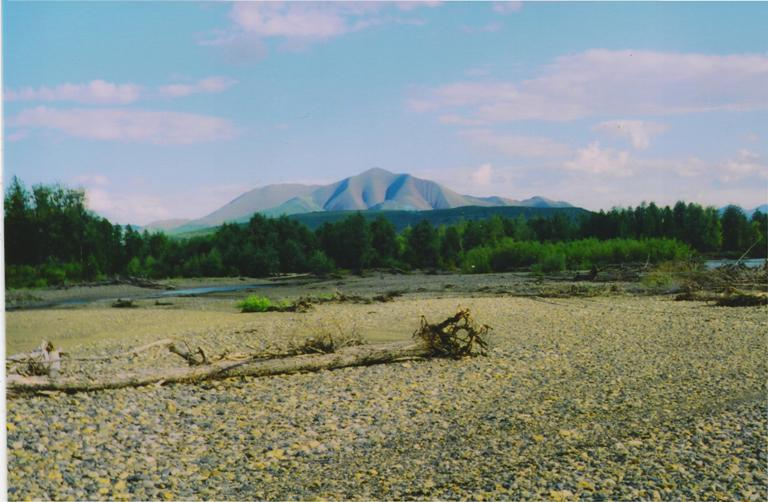
River Verina and Tuonnach Massif in the background.

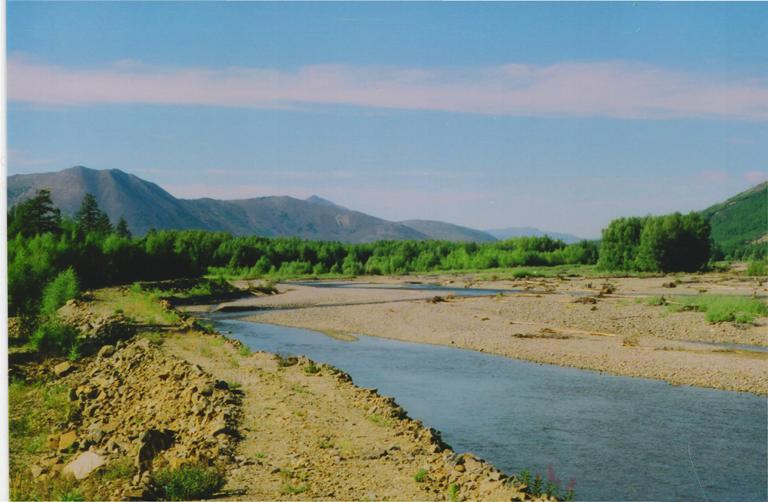
River Medvezhya, another tributary of the Seymchan.

== See also ==
- List of rivers of Russia
