= Seymchan (meteorite) =

Pallasite meteorite discovered in Russia

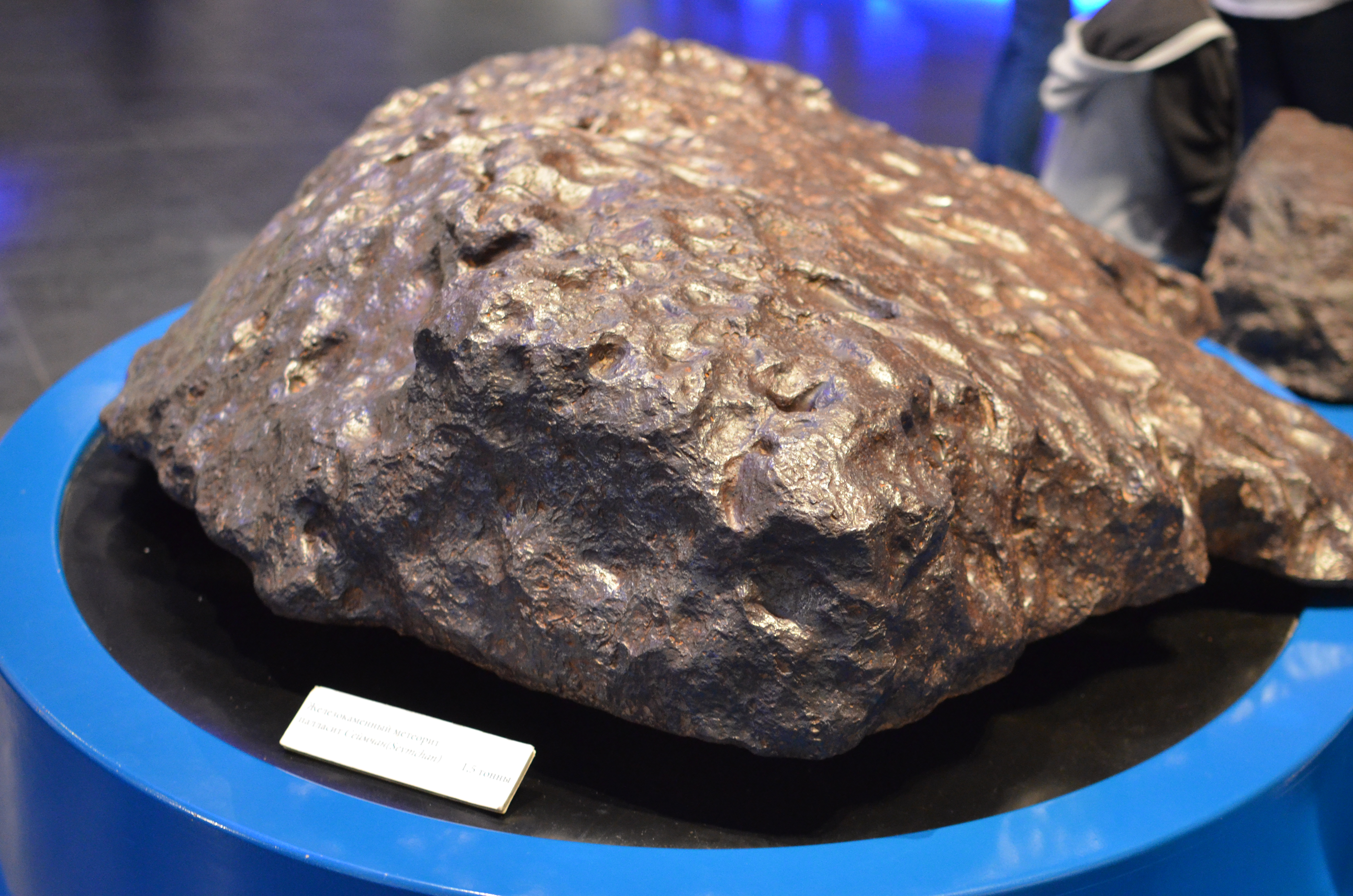
- The largest fragment of the Seymchan meteorite to date on display at the Moscow Planetarium
- Type: Stony-iron
- Structural classification: Coarse octahedrite
- Class: Pallasite
- Group: Main Group Pallasite
- Composition: 9.15% Ni, 24.6 ppm Ga, 68.3 ppm Ge, 0.55 ppm Ir.
- Country: Russia
- Region: Magadan Oblast
- Coordinates: 62°54′N 152°26′E
- Observed fall: No
- Found date: June 1967
- TKW: several tons
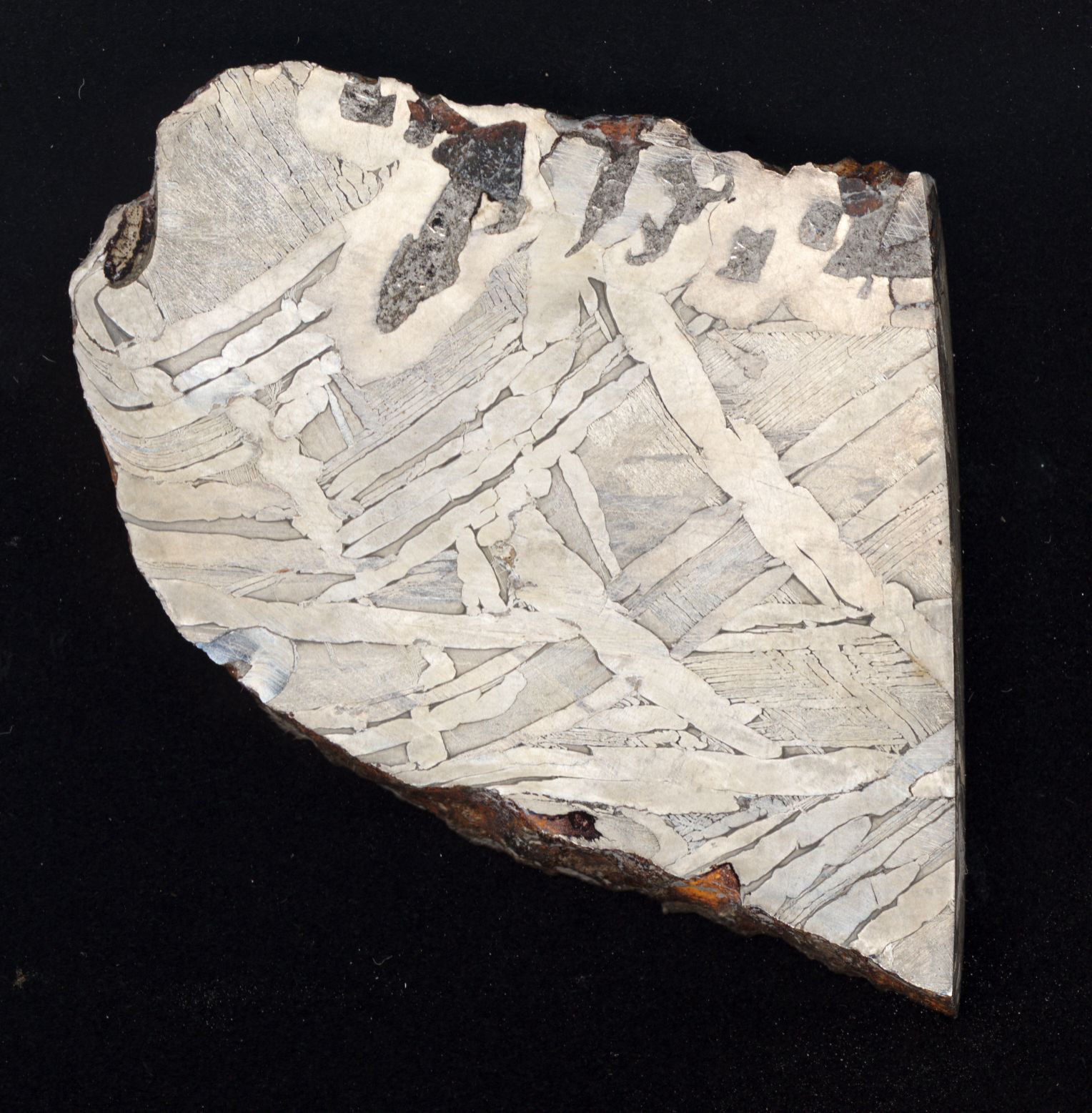
- An olivine-free portion of Seymchan
- Related media on Wikimedia Commons

Seymchan is a pallasite meteorite found in the dry bed of the river Hekandue, a left tributary of river Yasachnaya in the Magadan district, Russia, near the settlement of Seymchan, in June 1967.

== History ==
The main mass of 272.3 kilograms (600 lb) was found during a survey in June 1967 by geologist F. A. Mednikov. The mass was a triangular-shaped thumbprinted meteorite lying among the stones of the brook bed. A second specimen of 51 kilograms (112 lb) was found with a mine detector at a distance of 20 m from the first in October 1967 by I. H. Markov. The main mass was turned over to the Academy of Sciences of the USSR.

During a new expedition in 2004, Dmitri Kachalin recovered about 50 kilograms (110 lb) of new material. Remarkably, about 20% of the new specimens were found to contain olivine crystals, and so revealed the silicated nature of the meteorite. The pallasitic structure was not previously discovered during studies on small metal-only sections of the original mass.

Many more fragments were later found, the largest of which weighs approximately 1.5 tons. It is currently on display in the Urania Hall of the Moscow Planetarium.

== Composition and classification ==
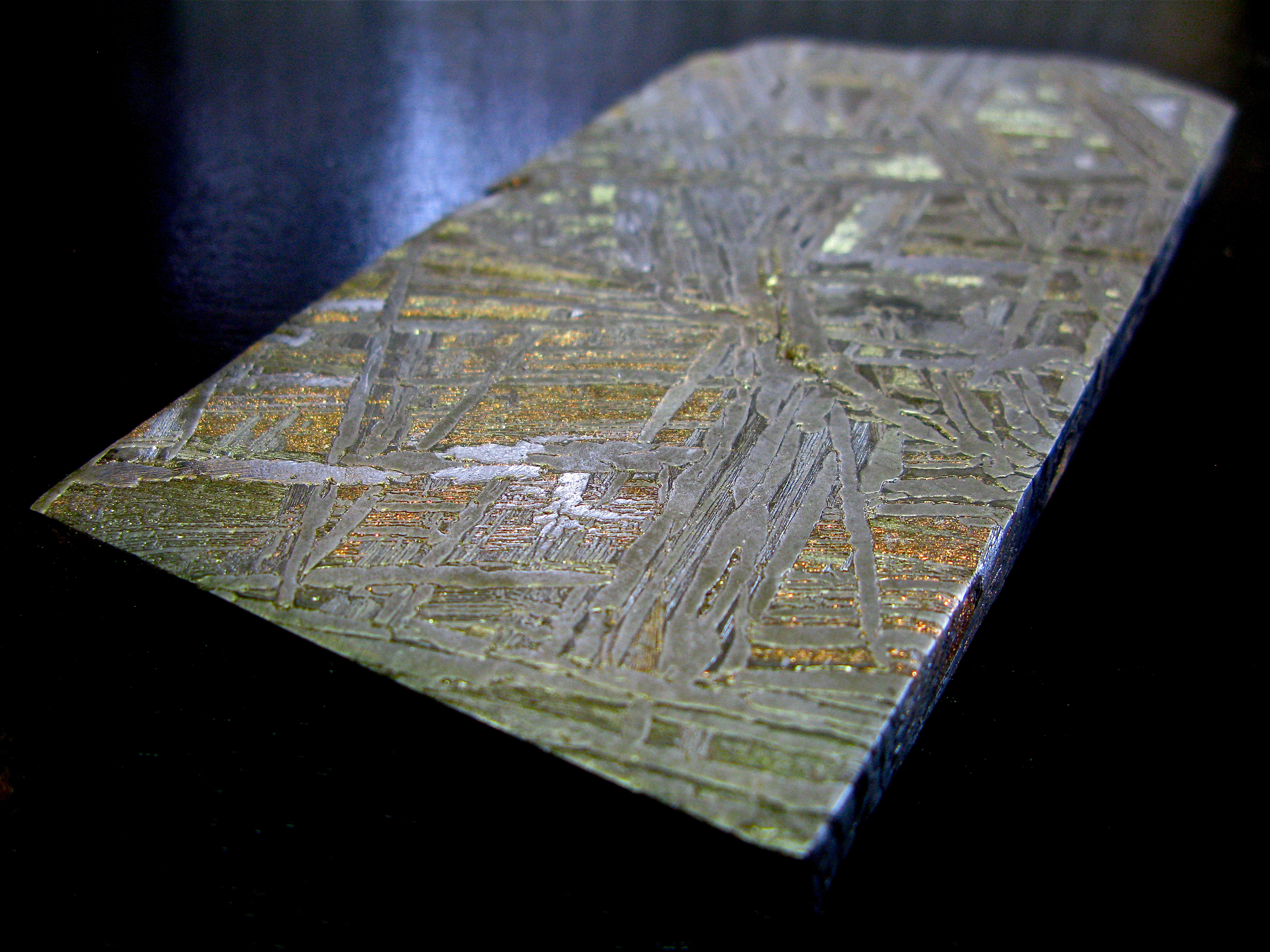
Seymchan, Pallasite, PMG.

Seymchan belongs to Main Group pallasites, but it is considered anomalous due to its high iridium content. Before the discovery of its pallasitic structure, it had been classified as IIE anomalous coarse octahedrite. Seymchan is considered a stable and rust-resistant pallasite.

=== Specimens ===
Due to the heterogeneous structure of Seymchan, there are two types of specimens: with or without olivine crystals. It is worthy to note that the specimen pictured to the left shows an interesting, rarely seen feature of iron meteorites. The Widmanstätten pattern on the left hand side of the specimen is visibly bent. This is caused by the shearing of the meteorite as it broke up during atmospheric entry and serves as testimony of the violent experience a meteor is subject to as it falls through the atmosphere.

== See also ==
- Glossary of meteoritics
