= Yukaghir Highlands =

Mountainous area in eastern Russia

- Юкагирское нагорье
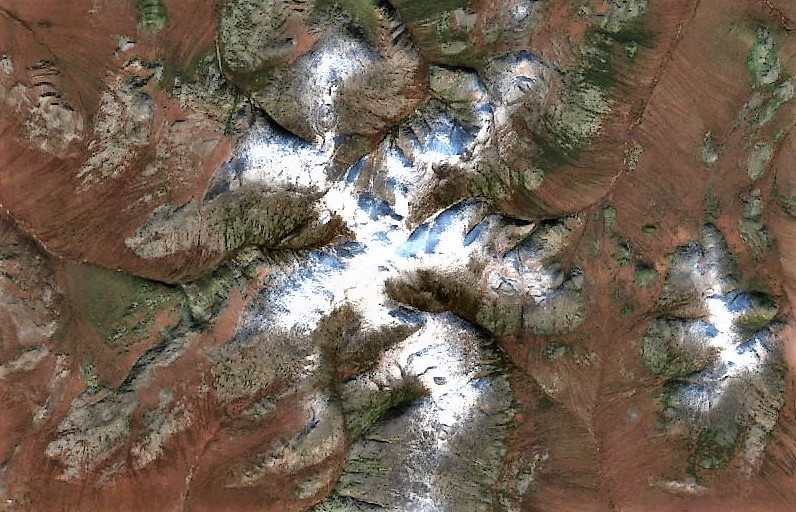
- Chubukulakh Sentinel-2 image

Highest point
- Peak: Chubukulakh
- Elevation: 1,128 m (3,701 ft)

Dimensions
- Length: 500 km (310 mi)
- Width: 300 km (190 mi)

Geography
- Location within Far Eastern Federal District
- Country: Russia
- Federal subject: Sakha, Magadan Oblast, Chukotka Autonomous Okrug
- Range coordinates: 66°25′N 154°0′E
- Parent range: East Siberian System

Geology
- Rock ages: Mesozoic (North) and Precambrian, Paleozoic and Triassic (South)
- Rock types: Volcanic rocks (North) and Metamorphic rocks (South)

The Yukaghir Highlands (Russian: Юкагирское нагорье) are a mountainous area in the Sakha Republic and Magadan Oblast, Far Eastern Federal District, Russia.

The area is named after the Yukaghir people.

== Geography ==
The Yukaghir Highlands are a mountain region located at the eastern limits of the Sakha Republic and the northwestern end of Magadan Oblast, as well as a little part in the westernmost limit of Chukotka Autonomous Okrug. They include two medium height mountain ranges, the Chubukulakh Range and the Siversky Range, as well as a plateau, the Yukaghir Tableland.

The average height of the intermontane basins of the plateau is between 300 meters (980 ft) and 700 meters (2,300 ft). In the ranges a few scattered mountains rise above 1,000 meters (3,300 ft) and the highest point is 1,128 metres (3,701 ft) high Mount Chubukulakh (Чубукулах).

The highlands are limited by the Kolyma Lowland to the west and the courses of the Bulun and Namyndykan rivers to the south. The Kolyma Mountains rise to the east and southeast. The Arctic Circle passes through the area.

=== Hydrography ===
The Yukaghir Highlands separate the basins of the Kolyma and Omolon rivers, both flowing roughly northwards. The latter marks the eastern limit. The Berezovka River has its sources within the area of the mountains.

== Flora ==
There are sparse forests of larch in the lower slopes of the mountain ranges and thickets of dwarf stone pine at higher altitudes. The mountaintops are covered with tundra.
