= Seymchan (urban-type settlement) =

Seymchan Сеймчан
- Urban-type settlement
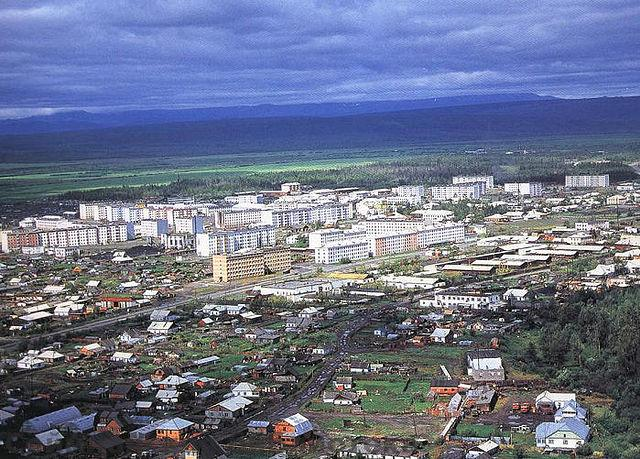
- View of Seymchan
- Interactive map of Seymchan
- Location of Seymchan Seymchan (Magadan Oblast)
- Coordinates: 62°55′51″N 152°23′06″E
- Country: Russia
- Federal subject: Magadan Oblast
- Administrative district: Srednekansky District

Population (2010 Census)
  - Total: 2,818
  - Estimate (2025): 2,098 (−25.6%)

Administrative status
  - Capital of: Srednekansky District
- Time zone: UTC+11 (MSK+8)
- Postal code: 686160
- OKTMO ID: 44710000051

Seymchan (Russian: Сеймча́н, IPA: [sʲɪjmˈtɕan]) is an urban locality (an urban-type settlement) and the administrative center of Srednekansky District of Magadan Oblast, Russia. Population: 2,818 (2010 census); 3,725 (2002 census); 9,963 (1989 Soviet census).

Historical population
| Year | Pop. | ±% |
|---|---|---|
| 1939 | 279 | — |
| 1959 | 4,087 | +1364.9% |
| 1970 | 6,786 | +66.0% |
| 1979 | 8,234 | +21.3% |
| 1989 | 9,963 | +21.0% |
| 2002 | 3,725 | −62.6% |
| 2010 | 2,818 | −24.3% |
| 2021 | 2,153 | −23.6% |
Source: Census data

== Geography ==
Seymchan is located in the Seymchan-Buyunda Depression, which limits the Upper Kolyma Highlands from the east. The town lies on the right bank of the Seymchan River, near its confluence with the Kolyma, about 350 kilometers (220 mi) north of Magadan.

== History ==
The settlement was founded in the late 17th century by Yakuts. Its name derives from the Yakut language word Kheymchen, meaning Polynya. In the 19th century, the trade route between the Kolyma region and the Sea of Okhotsk, the Ola-Kolyma-Trakt was constructed through the settlement.

Economic development of the settlement increased with the opening of the first gold mines in 1931, and the discovery and later exploitation of brown coal reserves at Elgen in 1932, tin reserves in 1937 and cobalt ore in the early 1940s.

The construction of the modern settlement Seymchan began in 1940. During World War 2, an airfield was constructed to allow the delivery of aircraft through the Lend-Lease-Program between the Soviet Union and the USA.

From 1949 until 1955, the sub-settlement Nizhny-Seymchan (later called Kolymskoye and abandoned in 2005), located a few kilometres to the south directly on the Kolyma, was the location of a prison camp of Dalstroy, part of the Gulag camp network. Up to 5,700 prisoners were used in the mining of gold and tin, as well as timber production.

Seymchan was granted urban-type settlement status in 1953.

== Economy ==
The settlement is a regional food processing and timber industry center.

=== Transportation ===
Seymchan is connected by road with Magadan through a Kolyma Highway spur.

The Seymchan Airport is located half-way between Seymchan and Kolymskoye, with a paved RWY 18/36. During World War II, the airport was used to distribute American Lend-Lease war material to production facilities within the Soviet Union.

== Climate ==
Seymchan has a severe subarctic climate Dfc, closely bordering the Dfd. Winters are extreme due to the influence of the persistent Siberian High in the months of low sun, although not as cold as Dfd climates such as Oymyakon, Delyankir, Verkhoyansk etc. Summers are short and mild, but sometimes very warm. Precipitation is somewhat higher in the summer but is lowest in the spring. April, which is one of the warmest six months receives less than a third of the precipitation of November, one of the coldest month. As a result, it can technically be classified as Dsc, bordering on the extremely rare Dsd subtype under Köppen Climate Classification.

Climate data for Seymchan
| Month | Jan | Feb | Mar | Apr | May | Jun | Jul | Aug | Sep | Oct | Nov | Dec | Year |
|---|---|---|---|---|---|---|---|---|---|---|---|---|---|
| Record high °C (°F) | −5.9 (21.4) | −7.0 (19.4) | 8.7 (47.7) | 12.6 (54.7) | 28.0 (82.4) | 35.2 (95.4) | 36.1 (97.0) | 35.9 (96.6) | 27.8 (82.0) | 16.7 (62.1) | 6.7 (44.1) | 0.9 (33.6) | 36.1 (97.0) |
| Mean daily maximum °C (°F) | −33.6 (−28.5) | −27.9 (−18.2) | −16.8 (1.8) | −3.6 (25.5) | 9.7 (49.5) | 20.8 (69.4) | 23.0 (73.4) | 19.1 (66.4) | 10.5 (50.9) | −5.3 (22.5) | −23.4 (−10.1) | −32.8 (−27.0) | −5.0 (23.0) |
| Daily mean °C (°F) | −37.4 (−35.3) | −33.7 (−28.7) | −25.2 (−13.4) | −10.6 (12.9) | 4.2 (39.6) | 13.8 (56.8) | 15.9 (60.6) | 12.1 (53.8) | 4.1 (39.4) | −10.9 (12.4) | −27.9 (−18.2) | −36.4 (−33.5) | −11.0 (12.2) |
| Mean daily minimum °C (°F) | −41.6 (−42.9) | −39.0 (−38.2) | −32.8 (−27.0) | −18.8 (−1.8) | −2.2 (28.0) | 6.3 (43.3) | 8.6 (47.5) | 5.2 (41.4) | −1.5 (29.3) | −15.8 (3.6) | −32.4 (−26.3) | −40.4 (−40.7) | −17.0 (1.4) |
| Record low °C (°F) | −59.1 (−74.4) | −58.2 (−72.8) | −53.4 (−64.1) | −44.7 (−48.5) | −27.9 (−18.2) | −6.4 (20.5) | −4.2 (24.4) | −9.0 (15.8) | −19.6 (−3.3) | −40.1 (−40.2) | −53.6 (−64.5) | −56.6 (−69.9) | −59.1 (−74.4) |
| Average precipitation mm (inches) | 24.4 (0.96) | 20.2 (0.80) | 13.3 (0.52) | 8.5 (0.33) | 13.1 (0.52) | 32.4 (1.28) | 43.9 (1.73) | 44.8 (1.76) | 29.1 (1.15) | 20.1 (0.79) | 27.0 (1.06) | 23.1 (0.91) | 299.9 (11.81) |
| Average precipitation days (≥ 0.1 mm) | 18.7 | 16.7 | 12.2 | 7.2 | 6.4 | 9.2 | 11.4 | 10.8 | 9.4 | 12.2 | 17.2 | 17.9 | 149.3 |
| Average relative humidity (%) | 72.6 | 70.0 | 66.9 | 62.7 | 55.8 | 61.0 | 65.0 | 73.8 | 72.5 | 76.8 | 76.6 | 74.2 | 69.0 |
| Mean monthly sunshine hours | 24 | 84 | 192 | 275 | 287 | 308 | 284 | 210 | 145 | 107 | 51 | 8 | 1,975 |
Source: climatebase.ru

== 2007 Mi-8 helicopter crash ==
Commercial flights from Seymchan to nearby remote areas using the local forest fire protection service's Mi-8 helicopters are routine. On September 15, 2007 one such flight crashed on the Suruktash mountain while on its way to deliver paying passengers to the vicinity of the Burgali River. Six people died, and one, the craft's commander, survived with severe burns. The wreck and the survivor were spotted by another Mi-8, and the victim was flown to Seymchan for transport to a hospital.

== Meteorite ==
The settlement's name was used to identify a huge olivine-bearing stony-iron meteorite of 323 kilograms (712 lb), called the Seymchan meteorite, which was discovered in the bed of a brook in the summer of 1967.

== Notable people ==
- Margareta Ivănuș (1949–2025), Moldovan singer
