= Seymchan Airport =

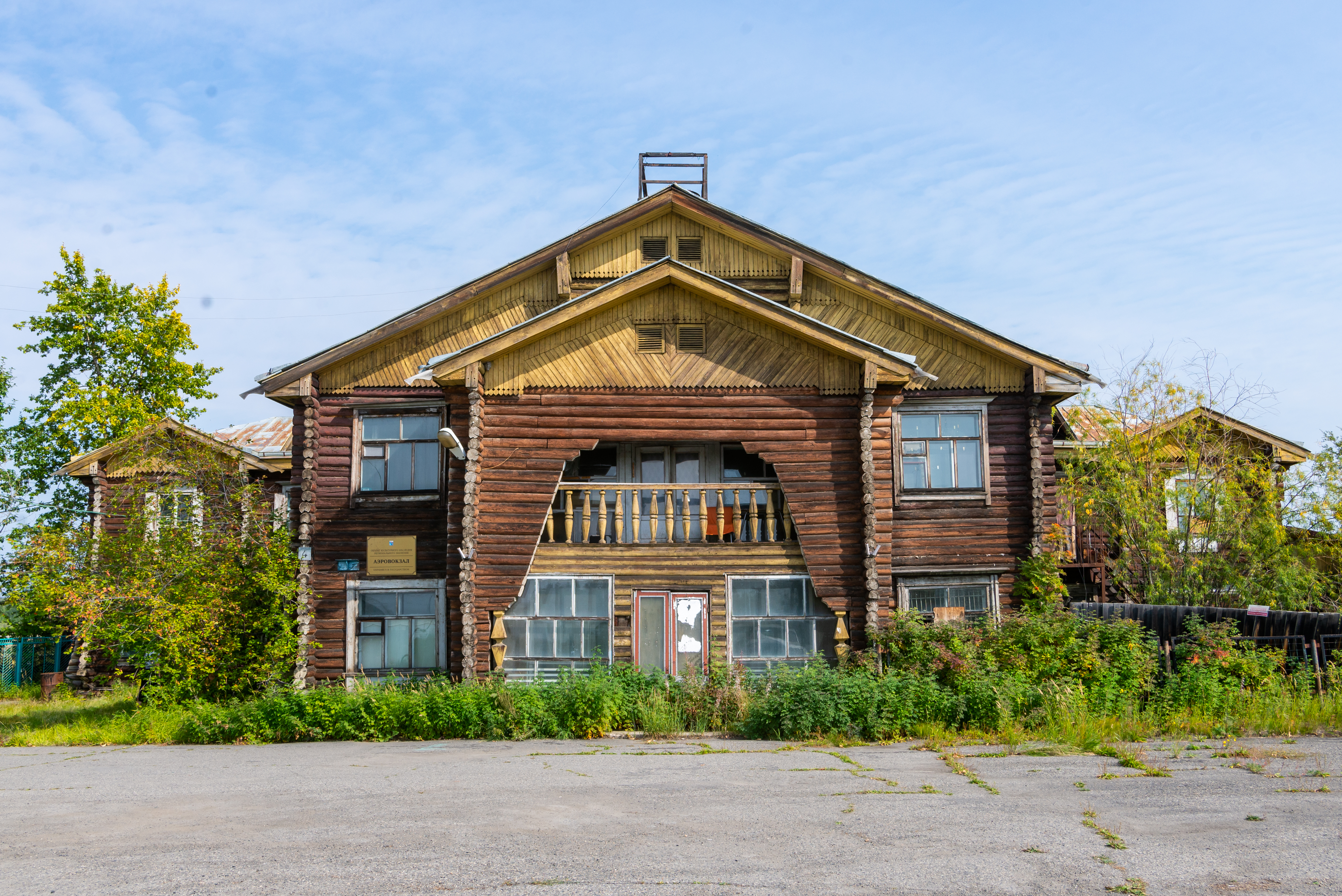
- IATA: none; ICAO: UHMS; LID: СМЧ

Summary
- Airport type: Public
- Location: Seymchan (urban-type settlement)
- Elevation AMSL: 679 ft / 207 m
- Coordinates: 62°55′12″N 152°25′19″E

Map
- Location in Magadan Oblast

Runways
Direction	Length		Surface
Direction	ft	m	Surface
18/36	5,315	1,620	Asphalt

Seymchan Airport (Russian: Аэропорт Сеймчан) (ICAO: UHMS) is an airport in Magadan Oblast, Russia, located two kilometers southeast of Seymchan.

The runway is well-maintained. The facility is marked as military on some US DoD charts.

== Airlines and destinations ==
Airlines	Destinations
SiLA Airlines	Magadan

Commercial trips by helicopter are made from this airport to arranged destinations in the wilderness, for example, for hunters.

== History ==
Seymchan Airport connected Zyryanka West Airport (UESU) to Oymyakon on the ALSIB Alaska-Siberian air route during the World War II Lend-Lease program.

== Incidents and accidents ==
Commercial flights from Seymchan to nearby remote areas using the local forest fire protection service's Mi-8 helicopters are routine.

- On 15 September 2007, one such flight crashed on the Suruktash mountain while on its way to deliver paying passengers to the vicinity of the Burgali river. 6 people died, and one, the craft's commander, survived with severe burns. The wreck and the survivor were spotted by another Mi-8, and the victim was flown to Seymchan for transport to a hospital.

== See also ==
- List of airports in Russia
