= Omolon =

Omolon Омолон / Омолоон
- Mouth location in the Far Eastern Federal District, Russia

Location
- Country: Russia

Physical characteristics
- Source: Otaikachan Range; Kolyma Mountains
  - coordinates: 62.7186°N 157.5191°E
- Mouth: Kolyma
  - coordinates: 68.7042°N 158.6972°E
- Length: 1,114 km (692 mi)
- Basin size: 113,000 km^{2} (44,000 sq mi)

Basin features
- Progression: Kolyma→ East Siberian Sea

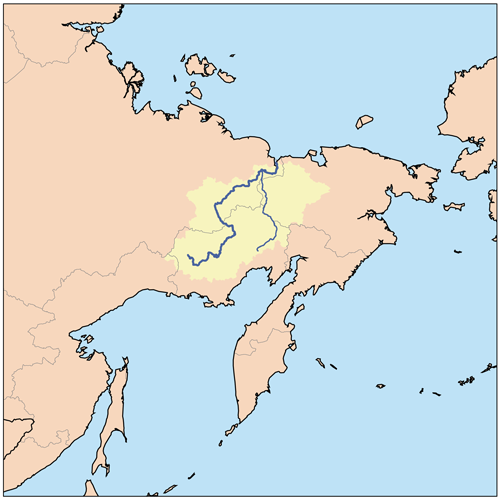
The Omolon flows into the Kolyma.

The Omolon (Russian: Омолон; Yakut: Омолоон, Omoloon) is the principal tributary of the Kolyma in northeast Siberia. The length of the river is 1,114 kilometres (692 mi). The area of its basin is 113,000 square kilometres (44,000 mi^{2}). The Omolon freezes up in October and stays under ice until late May through early June. The lower 600 kilometres (370 mi) are navigable.

== Course ==
It begins in the Kolyma Highlands, Magadan Oblast, less than 100 kilometres (62 mi) from the Sea of Okhotsk, flows first northeast, with the Kedon Range to the west, then it bends northwest and forms part of the border of Magadan and Chukotka, with the Yukaghir Highlands to the west. At the western end of the Ush-Urekchen it turns north and crosses Chukotka, briefly enters the Sakha Republic and joins the Kolyma 282 kilometres (175 mi) upstream from the Arctic. Its basin is surrounded by: (west) branches of the Kolyma, (south) Penzhina and others that flow south, (east) Anadyr and (northeast) Bolshoy Anyuy.

Its main tributaries are the Kegali, the west-flowing Oloy (at 471 kilometres (293 mi), the largest tributary), Oloychan, Kedon, Namyndykan, Molongda (Молонгда or Моланджа) and Ango.

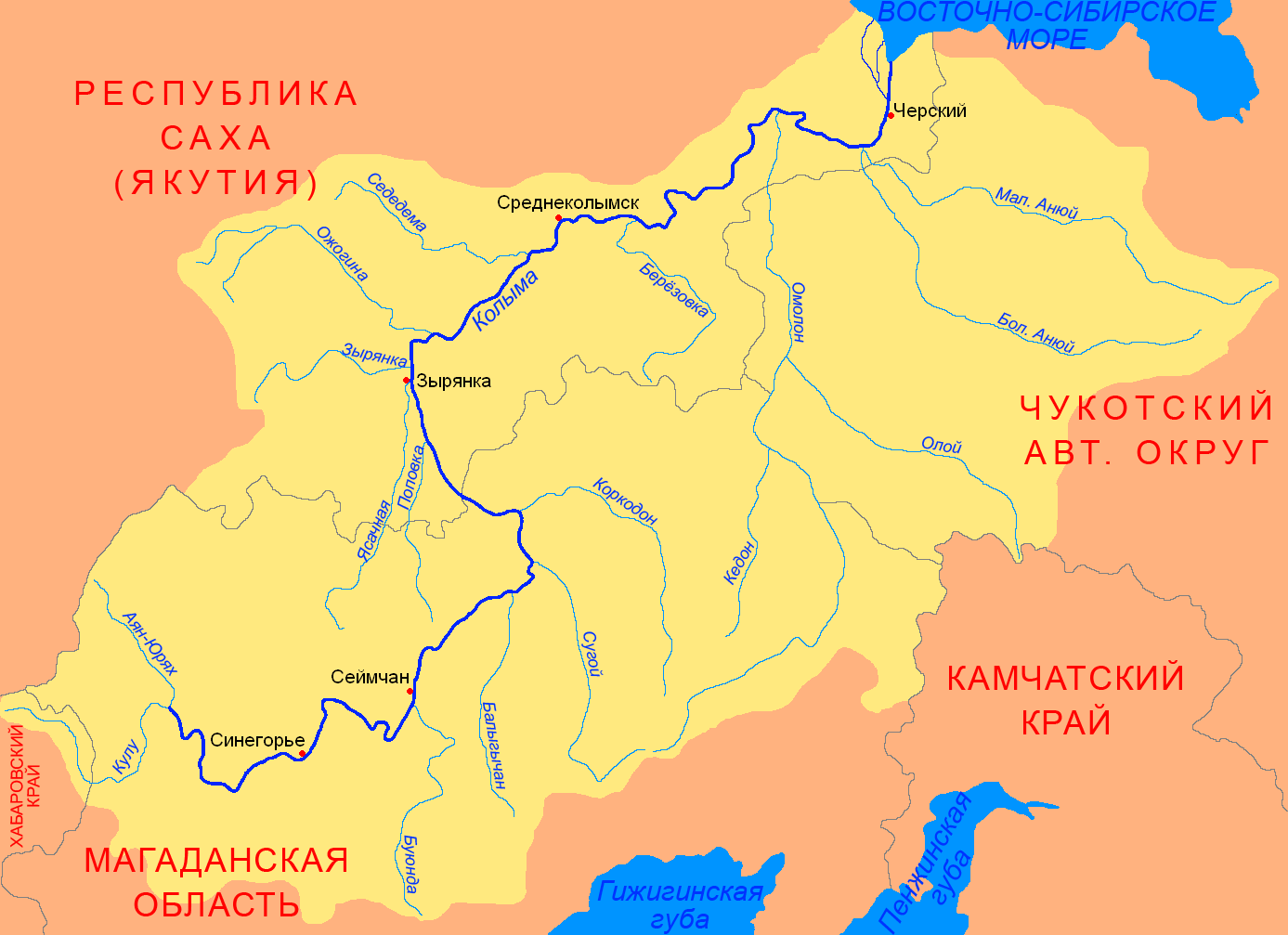
Basin of the Kolyma with its main tributaries

== Flora and fauna ==
The upper Omolon is subalpine in the highlands, the middle is boreal forest and the lower part tundra. There is a Zakaznik in Chukotka to protect the forests.

== See also ==
- List of rivers of Russia
