= Severo-Evensky District =

Severo-Evensky District Северо-Эвенский район (Russian)
- District
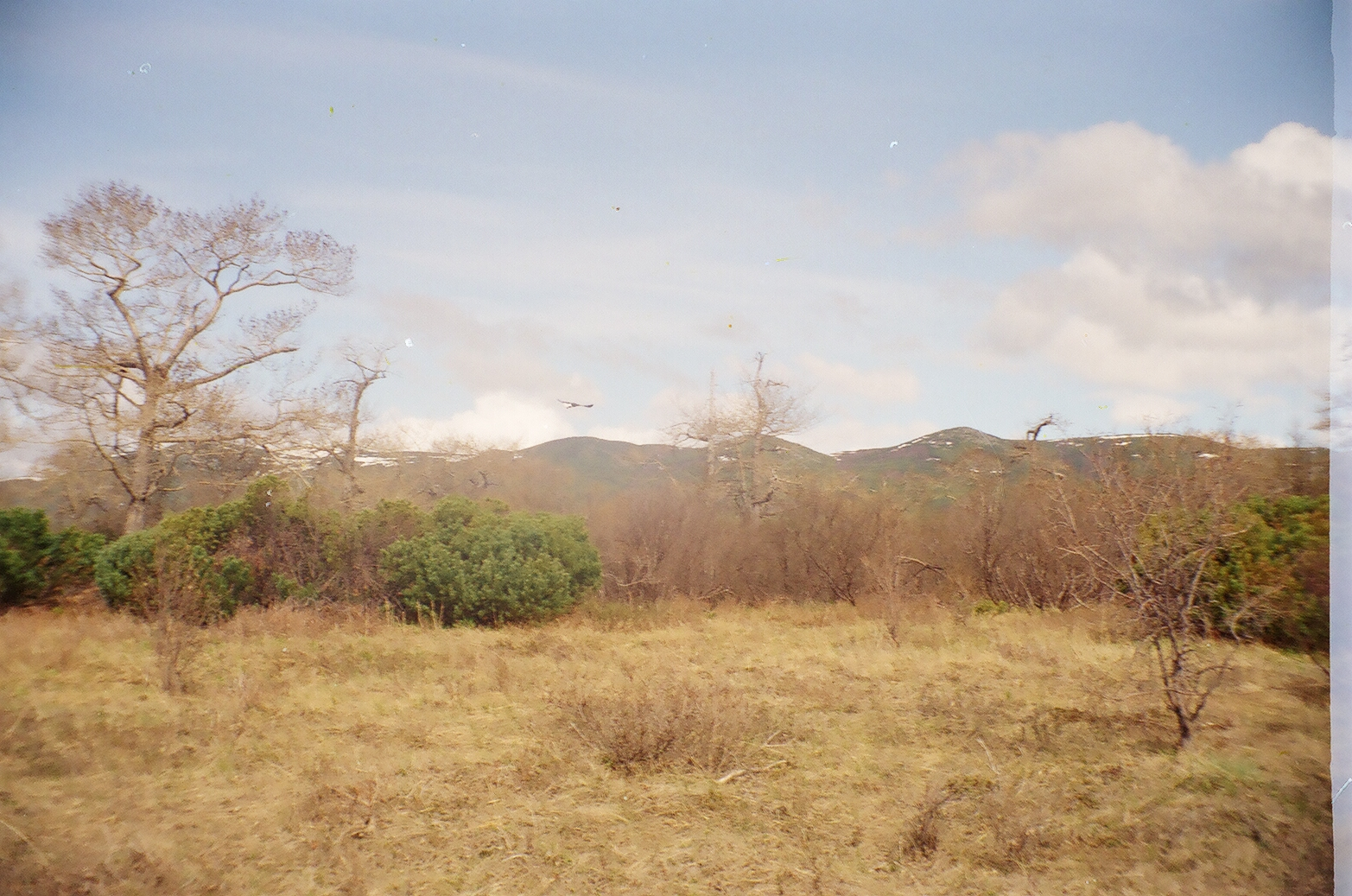
- Tavatumsky thermal spring, Severo-Evensky District

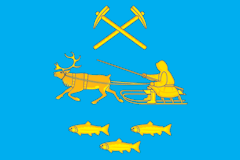
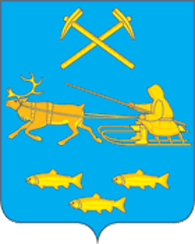
- Flag Coat of arms
- Location of Severo-Evensky District in Magadan Oblast
- Coordinates: 63°30′N 160°00′E
- Country: Russia
- Federal subject: Magadan Oblast
- Established: 1930
- Administrative center: Evensk

Area
  - Total: 102,000 km^{2} (39,000 sq mi)

Population (2010 Census)
  - Total: 2,666
  - Estimate (January 1, 2023): 1,525
  - Density: 0.0261/km^{2} (0.0677/sq mi)
  - Urban: 67.3%
  - Rural: 32.7%

Administrative structure
  - Inhabited localities: 1 urban-type settlements, 6 rural localities

Municipal structure
  - Municipally incorporated as: Severo-Evensky Municipal District
  - Municipal divisions: 1 urban settlements, 4 rural settlements
- Time zone: UTC+11 (MSK+8)
- OKTMO ID: 44607000
- Website: https://sevensk.49gov.ru/

Severo-Evensky District (Russian: Северо-Эвенский райо́н) is an administrative and municipal district (raion), one of the eight in Magadan Oblast, Russia. It is located in the east of the oblast. The area of the district is 102,000 square kilometers (39,000 sq mi). Its administrative center is the urban locality (an urban-type settlement) of Evensk. Population: 2,667 (2010 census); 3,744 (2002 Census); 8,275 (1989 Soviet census). The population of Evensk accounts for 67.3% of the district's total population.

Historical population
Year	Pop.	±%
1939	1,793	—
1959	4,781	+166.6%
1970	6,164	+28.9%
1979	7,475	+21.3%
1989	8,275	+10.7%
2002	3,744	−54.8%
2010	2,666	−28.8%
2021	1,581	−40.7%
Population size may be affected by changes in administrative divisions. Source: Censuses

== Geography ==
The district is located in the area of the Kolyma Mountains.
