= SS Dzhurma =

Steamship serving Soviet Gulag system

History
- Name: 1921: Brielle; 1935: Djurma (also known as Dzhurma)
- Owner: 1921: Royal Netherlands Steamship Company; 1935: Dalstroi; 1953: Far East Shipping Company
- Operator: 1921: Verenigde Nederlandsche Scheepvaartmaatschappij; 1935: Dalstroi
- Port of registry: 1921: Amsterdam, Netherlands; 1935: Nogaevo, Soviet Union
- Builder: Scheepsbouw Maatschappij Nieuwe Waterweg, Schiedam
- Launched: 31 December 1920
- Completed: April 1921
- Fate: Scrapped 1970

General characteristics
- Type: Cargo ship
- Tonnage: 6,908 GRT
- Length: 122.7 m (402 ft 7 in) (pp)
- Beam: 17.8 m (58 ft 5 in)
- Depth: 34 ft 7 in (10.54 m)
- Decks: 3
- Propulsion: 1 x triple-expansion steam engine
- Speed: 10.5 knots (19.4 km/h)

SS Dzhurma (Russian: «Джу́рма», IPA: [ˈdʑurmə]) (Note: In the Western sources its name used to be spelled as Djurma. The ship's name has been most commonly transliterated as Dzhurma since 1974.) was converted to a Soviet steamship in 1935 and occasionally used for transporting prisoners within the Gulag system. Because of an urban legend of an incident in 1933–34 in which 12,000 prisoners were said to have died, it has become the most infamous ship of the Dalstroy prison fleet. The ship was built in the Netherlands in 1921 as the SS Brielle and sold to the Soviet Union in 1935.

== Career under the Netherlands flag ==
SS Brielle was launched on 31 December 1920 at the New Waterway shipyard in Schiedam in the Netherlands. The cargo ship was 122.7 metres (402 ft 7 in) long (pp) and was 17.8 metres (58 ft 5 in) abeam. The 6,908-gross-register-ton ship was powered by a single triple-expansion steam engine that could move it at speeds of up to 10.5 knots (19.4 km/h). After its completion in April 1921, it was delivered to the Royal Netherlands Steamship Company (Dutch: Koninklijke Nederlandse Stoomboot-Maatschappij or KNSM). The ship was operated by Verenigde Nederlandsche Scheepvaartmaatschappij (VNS), founded by a Dutch consortium (that included KNSM) after the end of World War I. The ship was eventually absorbed into the Royal Netherlands Steamship Company, one of the consortium members.

The ship sailed under the Dutch flag out of Amsterdam for most of the next 14 years.

During the Great Depression, the ship was taken out of service and laid up. When its owners faced financial pressures to sell the ship, it was purchased by the "Dalstroy" in 1935.

== Career under the Soviet Union flag ==
=== From April 1935 to September 1945 ===
In April and May 1935, the Soviet Union purchased ships in the Netherlands for the sea fleet of "Dalstroy". Eduard Berzin arrived in Amsterdam to see and check two purchased steamers Brielle and Almelo, which were renamed Dzhurma (Джурма) and Yagoda, the latter renamed Dalstroy (Дальстрой) after Genrikh Yagoda's fall, and to hasten the purchase of the third ship Batoe, which was renamed Kulu (Кулу). Yagoda was a sister ship of Dzhurma and the first purchased ship. Kulu was a different class of ship and was also purchased in 1935. The third ship was transferred to the Soviet flag under the name Djurma and registered with a home port of Nagayevo. Djurma or Dzhurma translates as "shining path" in the language of the Evenks from the Kolyma region.

The ship Yagoda was the first of the three purchased Dutch ships, to arrive in Nagayevo port on September 26, 1935. After the visit of Novorossiysk port, Dzhurma and Lulu arrived in Nagayevo in October 1935. The first Soviet captain of the ship Dzhurma was N.A. Finyakin.

Author Martin Bollinger reports that during the ship's Soviet career there is ample evidence that Dzhurma was used on Gulag routes between 1936 and 1950. As a part of the Dalstroy fleet, the ships Yagoda, Kulu and Dzhurma transported prisoners from Vladivostok, endpoint of the Transsiberian railway, across the Sea of Okhotsk to Kolyma via Nagayevo port, which was the port of Magadan city. Travel time to Magadan was about 6 to 14 days; trips to the Arctic were seasonal as during the winter the sea froze over. A steamer would make about ten trips a year. Conditions were horrendous, and many people did not survive the trip.

When the steamer Dzhurma or Kulu entered Nagayev Bay and signaled the arrival, everybody in the city knew that a new stage of prisoners had arrived, with up to 7,000 people in the holds. A column of ragged, hungry, wearied people, who had undergone night interrogations, were led from the shore to the "transitka" (the local name of transit camp), under the escort of submachine gunners with dogs. From here stages of prisoners went to camps in Kolyma.

A former captain of Dzhurma, who became a captain of the ship Dalstroy, was arrested in Magadan on November 6, 1937, when he was 43 years old. After six months of inquiry, he confessed to espionage in favor of Japan and was shot. Many members of Dalstroy's ship's crew were shot also, so that "the traces were swept up".

During 1937, the ship Dzhurma had 8 voyages to Nagayevo port and carried out 13,216 passengers and 42,442 tons of cargo.

As a rule, marine navigation for the port in Nagaev Bay began in May and ended in December or earlier. In 1938, navigation was opened on May 18, when ships Dzhurma and Dalstroy (ex. Yagoda) wintered in Nagaev Bay sailed to Vladivostok, and ship «Кулу» sailed from Vladivostok to Bagaev Bayto. 1938 navigation was completed on 22 December 1938.th in the ice from the Cape of Chirikov to the berthing piers of the port were shot more powerful "Dalstroy". The winter transactions with a powerful tug or icebreaker assistance was not carried out in the Nagaev Bay until 1919 year.

On August 27, 1939, a fire occurred in hold No 2 of the steamer Dzhurma, which proceeded from Vladivostok to Nagayev Bay with a stage of prisoners. According to some sources, the burning of fuels and lubricants was caused by the prisoners, who wanted the ship to be diverted to the nearest port for repairs, and to escape from there. The Soviet newspaper «Советская Колыма» (English: «Soviet Kolyma») wrote on September 29, 1939:

«... The steam ship arrived in Nagayevo with minimal loss of cargo. As per Order No 933 of the Chief Administration of the "Dalstroy" dated September 23, 1939, the gratitude for the shown courage, bravery and discipline was announced to all crew members of the ship».[16][17][18]

There was no information about causes of the fire or any victims. According to the some testimonies, dozens of prisoners died.

With the entry of the United States into World War II, the ship arrived for repairs at Seattle on January 31, 1942, under the Lend-Lease program. In addition to prisoner transport, it was also used to haul matériel across the Pacific, calling at the U.S. ports of San Francisco, Seattle and Portland, Oregon about a dozen times.

=== Cold War period ===
As per Josef Stalin's order and the resolution of SNK number 2358 dated September 14, 1945, the 126th light infantry corps, which was included in the Far Eastern Military District, received the task "to build on the Chukotka Peninsula defensive outposts to cover the main naval bases on the coast of the Gulf of Anadyr and Provideniya Bay, to provide land their antilanding defense." On September 2, 1945, 12 days after the surrender of Japan, Josef Stalin made his most important strategic decision: to strengthen the foothold in Chukotka, where recently the Soviet Union had friendly contacts with the United States under the lend-lease agreement. 10,000 soldiers and officers were brought to Providence Bay. Dalstroy's steamer Dzhurma was one of the ships, which carried the 126th light infantry corps from Vladivostok to Providence Bay in September 1945. This replacement of Soviet military troops mentioned as commencement of the Cold War in September 1945.

After 1950, the ship appears to have been used only for the carrying of cargo.

Due to the liquidation of Dalstroi in 1953, all ships of this company were transferred to Far East Shipping Company. Dzhurma was decommissioned in 1967. She was removed from Lloyd's Register of Shipping in 1968 to allow a ship of the same name to be built in Poland. The ship was scrapped in 1970.

=== Famous passengers of this ship ===
- General-Colonel Alexander Gorbatov — a Soviet military commander and Hero Of The Soviet Union. (Note: Our transit camp was replenished with new people, which arrived with the next echelon. Then we were transported to Nakhodka Bay, on the ship «Джурма», and we sailed to Magadan (А. В. Горбатов «Годы и войны»).)
- Yevgenia Ginzburg (1904–1977) — Soviet writer, teacher, journalist, mother of Vasily Aksyonov.
- Sofiya Petrovna Mezhlauk — the wife of Valery Mezhlauk. She was arrested in December 1937 and transported together with other women-prisoners to Kolyma on Dzhurma, they were disembarked at Magadan, as mentioned in the book Journey into the Whirlwind by Yevgenia Ginzburg.
- Georgiy Zhzhonov — Soviet and Russian actor of theatre and cinema.

== Alleged 1933–34 incident ==
In an account by David Dallin and Boris Nicolaevsky in their 1947 book Forced Labor in Soviet Russia, it was suggested that in the winter of 1933–34 the Dzhurma, ferrying 12,000 prisoners to Ambarchik, got trapped in the Arctic ice and was unable to move on until the spring. The story alleged that all prisoners died from frost and starvation with later versions indicating that surviving crew members may have resorted to cannibalism to survive. The story was propagated and widely accepted. If true, this would have been among the worst ship disasters of all time.

In his book Stalin's Slave Ships, Martin Bollinger examined the evidence and found that the Dzhurma did not enter service in the Dalstroi until 1935 and was not big enough to hold 12,000 prisoners. Bollinger estimated that the ship, if overcrowded, would be able to hold up to 6,500 prisoners. In addition, there are no accounts that this ship, which was not strengthened for Arctic travel, made the journey north through the Bering Strait to Ambarchik. Thus the alleged event has been proven not to be true. He suggested this could possibly be the case of a mistaken identitification involving the cargo ship Khabarovsk that, if it had been carrying passengers, had already deposited them at Ambarchik when it was trapped by ice during the 1933–34 winter. (Note: Often after the loss of a vessel, another ship would be commissioned under the same name. The history of this ship, or two ships, has not investigated properly still.)

== Shining path ==
As per Soviet Union ideology, Soviet people used "shining path" to see "shining future" and to build "shining life".

The Soviet musical-comedy film Shining path was filmed in 1940.

The old ship Dzhurma was decommissioned in 1967. The premier of the film Chief of Chukotka (1966–67) by Vladimir Valutsky and V. Viktorov was in the USSR on 17 of April, 1967. In this film the main hero says about "shining life", to see beginning of the film.

== Bibliography ==
- Bollinger, Martin J. (2003). Stalin's Slave Ships: Kolyma, the Gulag Fleet, and the Role of the West. Westport, Connecticut: Greenwood Publishing Group. ISBN 978-0-275-98100-6. OCLC 52258338.
- Rossi, Jacques (1989). The Gulag Handbook: An Encyclopedia Dictionary of Soviet Penitentiary Institutions and Terms Related to the Forced Labor Camps. New York: Paragon House. ISBN 978-1-55778-024-9. OCLC 18350327.
- Tolstoy, Nikolai (1981). Stalin's Secret War. London: J. Cape. ISBN 978-0-224-01665-0. OCLC 7830477.

== See also ==
- SS Indigirka
