= Staritsky =

Staritsky (masculine), Staritskaya (feminine), or Staritskoye (neuter) may refer to:

== Places ==
- Staritsky, Russia (Staritskaya, Staritskoye), several rural localities in Russia
- Staritsky District, a district of Tver Oblast, Russia
- Staritsky Peninsula, the location of Magadan, Magadan Oblast, Russia

== People ==
- Euphrosinia Staritskaya (died 1569), Russian noblewoman
- Konstantin Staritsky (1839–1909), Russian counter admiral, explorer, and hydrographer

== See also ==
- Staritsa
- Starytsky, the Ukrainian variant of the surname
