= Port of Magadan =

The Port of Magadan
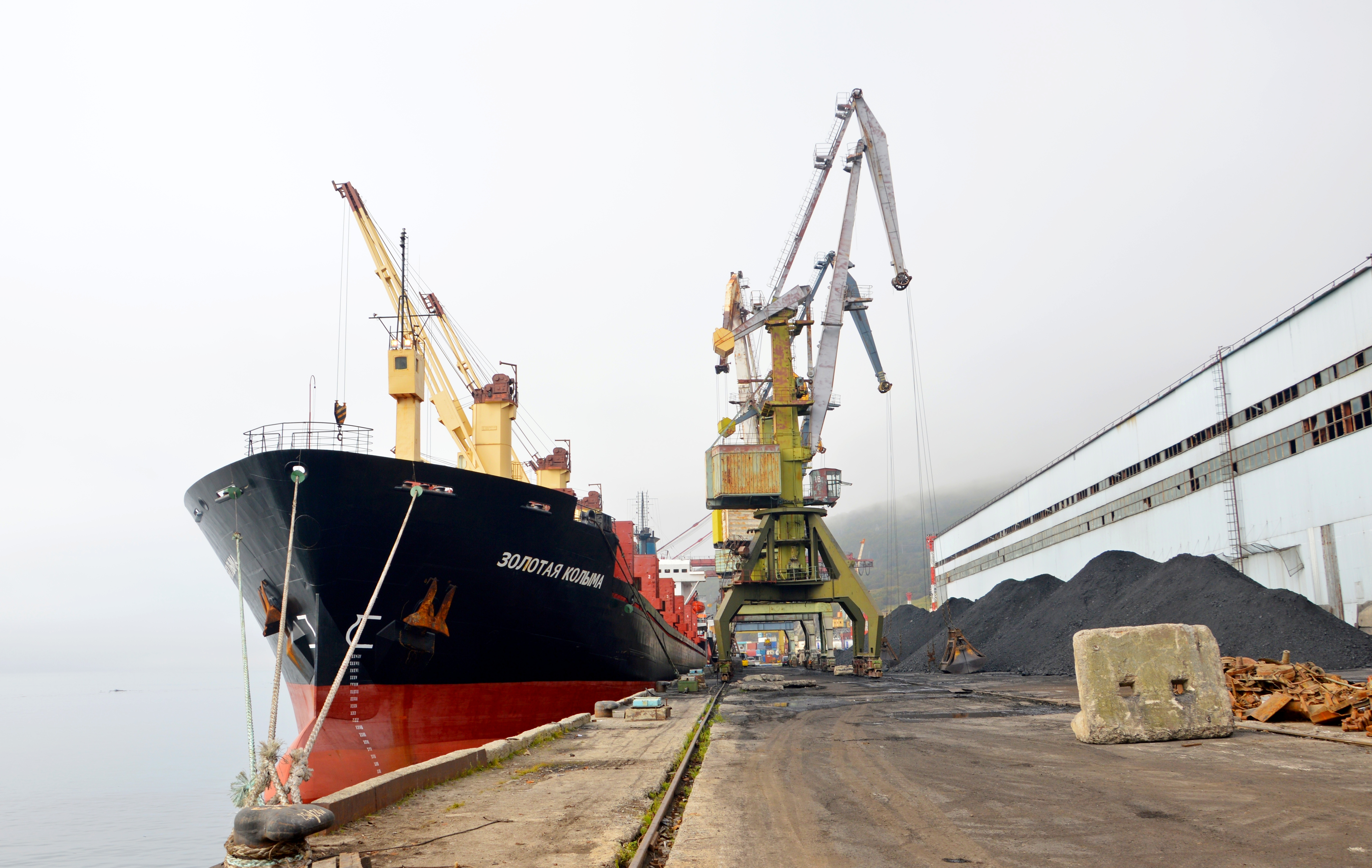
- View of the port
- Click on the map for a fullscreen view
- Native name: Морской порт Магадан

Location
- Country: Russia
- Location: Magadan, Magadan Oblast
- Coordinates: 59°32′21″N 150°46′26″E
- UN/LOCODE: RUGDX

Details
- Opened: 1932
- Type of harbour: Sea
- Land area: 32.64 Hec
- Size: Medium
- No. of berths: 13

Statistics
- Website; The Port of Magadan

The Port of Magadan (Russian: Морской порт Магадан, romanized: Morskoi port Magadan) is a maritime port in the city of Magadan, Magadan Oblast, Russia, located in the Nagaev Bay on the northern coast of the Sea of Okhotsk. The port has 13 berths, of which 3 are for oil products, container 2, and 8 for other goods.

== History ==
In 1932 the pier was built. On December 6, 1933, the first berths that allowed the mooring of a vessel were installed. In April 1935 commissioned a second jetty seaport 77. In 1947 in the waters of the Nagayevo Bay laden with explosives blew up the ship "General Vatutin". Technique, cargo, port facilities, commercial and administrative buildings - all were destroyed from that blast. In 1977, by order of Nagaevo port, it has been renamed the Magadan Commercial Sea Port. On April 3, 1981, the port was awarded the Order "Badge of Honor". In 1980 the current boundaries of the port were formed, which cover a total area of 32 hectares with objects placed on its port infrastructure. At this time, the port handled more than 4 million tons of cargo.

A Decree of the Council of Ministers of the Russian Federation signed on 30.08.1993 No.1551-p ordered the opening of the port for international maritime freight and passenger traffic. In July 2009, government resolution No.926 signed by Prime Minister Vladimir Putin established the boundaries of Magadan port, the port declared a register of Russian seaports.

With decree N1288 of 22/06/2016 of the Russian Federation Government, the Port of Magadan was added to a list of Russian seaports accepting ships carrying nuclear materials and radioactive substances.

== See also ==
- Nagayevo, Magadan
- Ports and harbours of the Russian Pacific Coast
