= Dalstroy =

Special directorate of the NKVD

- Дальстро́й
- Emblem of Dalstroy

Agency overview
- Formed: 13 November 1931; 94 years ago
- Dissolved: 29 May 1957; 69 years ago
- Type: Special type (комбинат особого типа)
- Headquarters: Dalstroy General Directorate Magadan, U.S.S.R.
- Agency executives: Eduard Berzin (1931–1937), Director; Karp Pavlov (1937–1939), Head director; Ivan Nikishov (1939–1948), Chief; Ivan Petrenko (1948–1950), Chief; Ivan Mitrakov (1950–1956), Chief; Yuri Chuguyev (1956–1957), Chief

Dalstroy (Russian: Дальстро́й, IPA: [dɐlʲˈstroj]), also known as Far North Construction Trust, was an organization set up in 1931 in order to manage road construction and the mining of gold in the Russian Far East, including the Magadan Region, Chukotka, parts of Yakutia and parts of present-day Kamchatka Krai.

Initially it was established as General Directorate of Construction in the Far North (Главное Управление строительства Дальнего Севера) under the Ministry of Internal Affairs of the Soviet Union. In 1938 it was placed under the NKVD and in 1945 it was reorganized and renamed. After the 1952 reorganization it was known as Main Directorate of Camps and Construction of the Far North.

Dalstroy oversaw the development and mining of the area. Over the years, Dalstroy created some 80 Gulag camps across the Kolyma region. As a result of a number of decisions, the total area covered by Dalstroy grew to three million square kilometers by 1951. The town of Magadan was the base for these activities.

== History ==
=== Background and scope of activities ===
Prisoners at Dalstroy facilities
Year	Number	Year	Number
1932	11,100	1944	84,716
1934	29,659	1945	93,542
1935	36,313	1946	73,060
1936	48,740	1947	93,322
1937	70,414	1948	106,893
1938	90,741	1949	108,685
1939	138,170	1950	153,317
1940	190,309	1951	182,958
1941	187,976	1952	199,726
1942	177,775	1953	175,078
1943	107,775		
Figures for 1 January for each year. Figure for 1932 for December

The main purpose of Dalstroy as an organization was to obtain benefits for the state from little-known and little-explored territories of Northeast Siberia. Expeditions were financed by the USSR in order to explore the region as early as 1928. The First Kolyma Expedition in 1928 led by geologist Yuri Bilibin and the Second Kolyma Expedition in 1931–1932, organized by Bilibin and led by Valentin Tsaregradsky resulted in the discovery of gold deposits in Northeast Siberia. From then onward, emphasis was laid in ambitious mining operations to obtain the maximum amount of gold and other strategically important minerals.

Dalstroy authorities chose civilians employed as labor force, but faced with the harsh climate, with long winters and extremely low temperatures, working conditions were brutal from the onset. After the organization was placed under the NKVD in 1938, prisoners from various forced labor camps (ITL - Исправительно-трудовой лагерь) of the USSR were used as miners, as well as for the building of the infrastructure that the region lacked. Development of the area included industrial, railway, airfield, harbor and road construction, as well as providing the administrative and urban structure for a territory which previously had had no roads and no cities.

The Okhotsk Sea shore of the Kolyma region was sparsely inhabited by Evens. Since the area was chosen as a harbor for future operations, a plan for the establishment of an East Even Cultural Base (Восточно-Эвенская культбаза) was carried out. After surveying the area in 1928, the spot of the base was chosen by Karl Luks at a certain location in Nagaev Bay. Construction began in 1929 in order to settle and re-educate the local population and to educate the younger generation in line with the Soviet Cultural Revolution. Among the structures built, there were three residential buildings, a school, a veterinary station, a hospital, a bathhouse and a boarding school. By the end of the year there were 75 residents. However, there was resistance from the part of the native population to the system of cooperatives, district committees and to have their children educated at the school of the cultural base. In the first academic year 1929/1930, only 17 students enrolled at the school and even though the number of students rose to 44 in the following year, the base was wrapped up owing to low efficiency. However, the village of Nagaevo grew around the base and the Kamchatka Joint-Stock Company (AKO) erected a building. More ships entered the harbor and the area continued developing, paving the way for modern Magadan. Some of the East Even Cultural Base buildings survived well into the 1980s.

=== Evolution over time ===
The administration of Dalstroy grew increasingly complex over the years, not only as a result of various geographical centers but also with the establishment of separate units to provide geological surveying, motorized transport, management of secondary economies, road administration, steamship navigation on the River Koyma, and port and terminal management.

In his book Red Arctic, John McCannon explains how Dalstroy initially relied on Glavsevmorput or GUSMP (Russian acronym for Main Administration of the Northern Sea Route, a Soviet agency for exploiting resources across the far north) for coordination of supplies and transport. Glavsevmorput managed railway traffic to Vladivostok and shipping from there to Magadan. Over the years, however, as Dalstroy grew more powerful, its director Eduard Berzin obtained ships of his own so as to have more freedom of action. By 1938 Glavsevmorput had lost much of its political support, leaving Dalstroy firmly in control.

In November 1948, under pressure from the Ministry of Non-Ferrous Metallurgy, Dalstroy played a pioneering role in the reform of the Soviet forced labour system. After it introduced a wage for prisoners and other measures to stimulate productivity, it became fully self-financing. This led to the Dalstroy pilot model quickly spreading throughout the country. The Volga–Don Canal was among the first projects to emulate its approach.

== Transport ==
=== Shipping ===
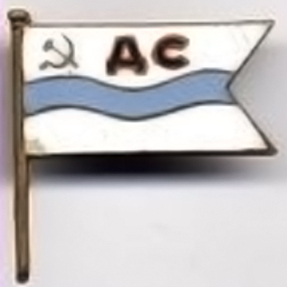
Dalstroy Fleet flag.

An account of the many ships used over the years to transport prisoners across the Sea of Okhotsk to Magadan as well as to the Arctic port of Ambarchik is given by Martin Bollinger in his book Stalin's Slave Ships. Among the Dalstroy fleet were the following ships:

- SS Yagoda, later renamed SS Dalstroy
- SS Dzhurma
- SS Kulu
- SS Felix Dzherzhinsky
- SS Indigirka
- MV Sovetskaya Latviya

In addition, several ships of the Far East State Sea Shipping Company were used at times to transport prisoners to various locations operated by Dalstroy. Examples include SS Nevastroi, SS Dneprostroi, SS Shaturstroi, SS Syasstroi, SS KIM, and SS Kiev.

=== Aviation ===
Air service in Dalstroy administered territories began in 1932. By 1946 Dalstroy had an air transport branch, Dalstroy Aviation (1946–1957), under the Dalstroy Air Transport Directorate. The aircraft flown by the airline included Polikarpov Po-2, Lisunov Li-2, Douglas C-47, Polikarpov P-5, Yakovlev Yak-12, Kawasaki Ki-56 and Antonov An-2, as well as Beriev MP-1 flying boats.

== Leadership ==
In the words of prisoner Ayyub Baghirov, "The entire administration of the Dalstroy – economic, administrative, physical and political – was in the hands of one person who was invested with many rights and privileges."

The officials in charge of Dalstroy were:

- Eduard Petrovich Berzin, 1932–1937
- Karp Aleksandrovich Pavlov, 1937–1939
- Ivan Fedorovich Nikishov, 1940–1948
- Ivan Grigorevich Petrenko, 1948–1950
- I.L. Mitrakov, 1951–1956
- Yuri Chuguev, 1956–1957

== Disbanding ==
After Joseph Stalin's death in 1953, the reorganization of the Dalstroy basically split its functions into three parts. The administration of labor camps was reorganized into USVITL (North-East Corrective Labor-Force Administration) of Gulag. The administration of the territory and local Communist Party of the Soviet Union apparatus were subordinated to the newly created Magadan Oblast and other adjacent territorial subdivisions. Dalstroy remained a purely economic enterprise.

== See also ==
- Butugychag
- Sevvostlag
- Vaninsky port
