= Eduard Berzin =

Latvian NKVD officer

- Эдуард Петрович Берзин
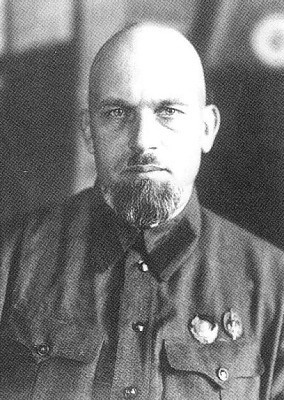
- Eduard Berzin in 1935

Director of the Dalstroy
- In office 14 November 1931 – 1937
- Premier: Joseph Stalin
- Preceded by: Office established
- Succeeded by: Karp Pavlov

Personal details
- Born: Eduards Bērziņš; 19 February September [O.S. 7 February] 1893 Kreis Wolmar, Governorate of Livonia, Russian Empire (now Latvia)
- Died: 1 August 1938 Moscow, Soviet Union
- Party: VKP(b)
- Spouse: Elza Mittenberga
- Children: Pēteris, Mirdza
- Education: Royal Academy of the Arts (Berlin)
- Awards: Russian Order of St. George 4th Class and others

Eduard Petrovich Berzin (Russian: Эдуа́рд Петро́вич Бе́рзин, Latvian: Eduards Bērziņš; 19 February 1894 – 1 August 1938) was a Latvian Bolshevik, Chekist and NKVD officer that set up Dalstroy, which instituted a system of slave-labor camps in Kolyma, North-Eastern Siberia, one of the most brutal Gulag regions, where hundreds of thousands of political prisoners died or were murdered in subsequent decades.

== Biography ==
=== Early life ===
Bērziņš was born in to a Latvian peasant family. Before World War I, Bērziņš studied painting at the Royal Academy of the Arts in Berlin, where he met his wife, Elza Mittenberga, who was also an artist, from Riga. In 1915, he joined the Russian army and fought in the First World War, where he was awarded the Cross of St. George and became an officer.

After the outbreak of the Russian Revolution of 1917, he joined the communists. In 1918, Berzin became a commander of the First Artillery Division of the Red Latvian Riflemen with special responsibilities for Vladimir Lenin's protection. Gaining the trust of Feliks Dzerzhinsky, he soon became a member of the Cheka secret political police.

In 1926, Joseph Stalin gave Berzin the task of setting up the Vishera complex of labour camps in the Urals known as Vishlag where cellulose and paper were to be produced. This he did with great enthusiasm and success. The 70,000 prisoners there were in most cases treated surprisingly well, even receiving wages and benefitting from cinemas, libraries, discussion clubs and dining halls.

=== As head of Dalstroy ===
It was apparently on the basis of this success that in 1931, Stalin appointed him head of Dalstroy, the authority which was to develop Kolyma, making use essentially of forced labour consisting of some convicted criminals, but mainly political prisoners. He arrived in Nagaev Bay by steamship on 2 February 1932 together with a few prisoners (mainly mining engineers) and some security guards.

It is reported that Berzin's primary aim was to exploit the region to the fullest capacity, in line with the objectives of Stalin's first five-year plan. The prisoners were simply, his workforce. The focus of his attention was gold mining, as gold was needed to pay for industrial development across Russia. This required construction of the harbour town of Magadan, substantial road building, some lumbering, and building numerous labour camps.

From the very start, however, the lack of proper preparations combined with an exceptionally hard winter in 1932 and 1933 led to tremendous hardship, particularly for the prisoners sent up into the River Kolyma valley to build roads and mine gold, very many of whom perished in the cold.

It was said that Berzin tried to treat his prisoners comparatively well in order to enable them to carry out their work as efficiently as possible. In reality, this was only a half-truth: while Berzin allowed hard-working prisoners shortened sentences—and even paid them salaries—he also sent less valuable prisoners to smaller camps, known as lagpunkts, where many were tortured and killed. After the hard winter of 1932 and difficult conditions the following summer, the situation started to evolve more positively. Although hardships continued, the overall efficiency of the operations and the conditions for the prisoners improved under Berzin's leadership. The same can be said for the overall gold production, as "Kolyma’s gold output increased eight times in the first two years of Dalstroi’s operation."

The years of 1934 to 1937 were remembered as a comparatively good period, particularly in the light of what was to follow under later leaders. The Soviet Union purchased the ships in the Netherlands for the sea fleet of "Dalstroy" in April and May 1935, and Eduard Berzin arrived in Amsterdam to see and check two purchased steamers Brielle and Almelo, which were renamed Dzhurma and «Яго́да» (later was renamed «Дальстрой»), and to hasten the purchase the third ship «Кулу».

Upon returning to Kolyma, no doubt as a result of instructions he had received, he issued even harsher orders. Prisoners were required to work in the opencast mines at temperatures as low as -55 C. As a result, annual gold output rose to 33 tons.

Despite the dreadful conditions and the high death toll, over the years Berzin succeeded in having a road built to Seymchan high up in the Kolyma valley which was to lead to even higher gold outputs in subsequent years.

=== Family life in Kolyma ===
In her memoirs, his wife Elza describes their family life in Magadan in some detail. Berzin, clad in a bearskin coat, would spend the days travelling around the camps in the Rolls-Royce that used to be Lenin's car to personally oversee the work in progress. He only saw his children - Petia aged 12 and Mirza aged 15 - at breakfast and dinner. He enjoyed music, listened to gramophone records of Tchaikovsky, Schubert and Edvard Grieg (which he had bought on an official visit to Philadelphia in 1930), and encouraged the children to perform in the school theatre under the guidance of artistic prisoners.

Shortly after a holiday with his family in Italy with visits to Rome, Venice and Sorrento, Berzin left Magadan on 4 December 1937 and was arrested upon his arrival in Moscow on 19 December, accused of spying for Britain and Germany and planning to put Magadan under the control of the Japanese. On 1 August 1938, at the end of the Great Purge, Berzin was tried and immediately shot at Lubyanka prison. He was posthumously rehabilitated in 1956.

== Assessment and commemoration ==
While Berzin used increasingly brutal methods in the Kolyma camps, his tactics were not as dreadful as those used by his successors. Nevertheless, under pressure from Stalin, he drove his workforce to impossible levels of hardship which inevitably resulted in illness, starvation, and death in even higher proportions.

There are streets named after Eduard Berzin in Magadan, Anadyr, Bilibino, Ust-Belaya, Krasnovishersk and Dalnegorsk. A monument to him was erected in front of the city administration of Magadan in 1989.

In 2018, Eduard Berzin was in the short list of potential new official names for the airport of Magadan, eventually losing to Vladimir Vysotsky.

== See also ==
- OGPU

== Sources ==
- Applebaum, Anne, Gulag: A History, Broadway Books, 2003, hardcover, 720 pp., ISBN 0-7679-0056-1
- Bollinger, Martin J., Stalin’s slave ships : Kolyma, the Gulag fleet, and the role of the West, Praeger, 2003, 217 p., ISBN 0-275-98100-2
- Conquest, Robert: Kolyma: The Arctic Death Camps, Viking Press, 1978, 254 p. ISBN 0-670-41499-9
- Kizny, Tomasz, Gulag, Firefly Books, 2004, 495 p. ISBN 1-55297-964-4
- Shalamov, Varlam, Kolyma Tales, Penguin Books, 1995, 528 pp., ISBN 0-14-018695-6
- Toker, Leona, "Return from the Archipelago: narratives of Gulag survivors", Indiana University Press, c2000, 333 p., ISBN 0-253-33787-9
