= Church of the Nativity (Magadan) =

Church in Magadan, Russia

Coordinates: 59.5539°N 150.8309°E

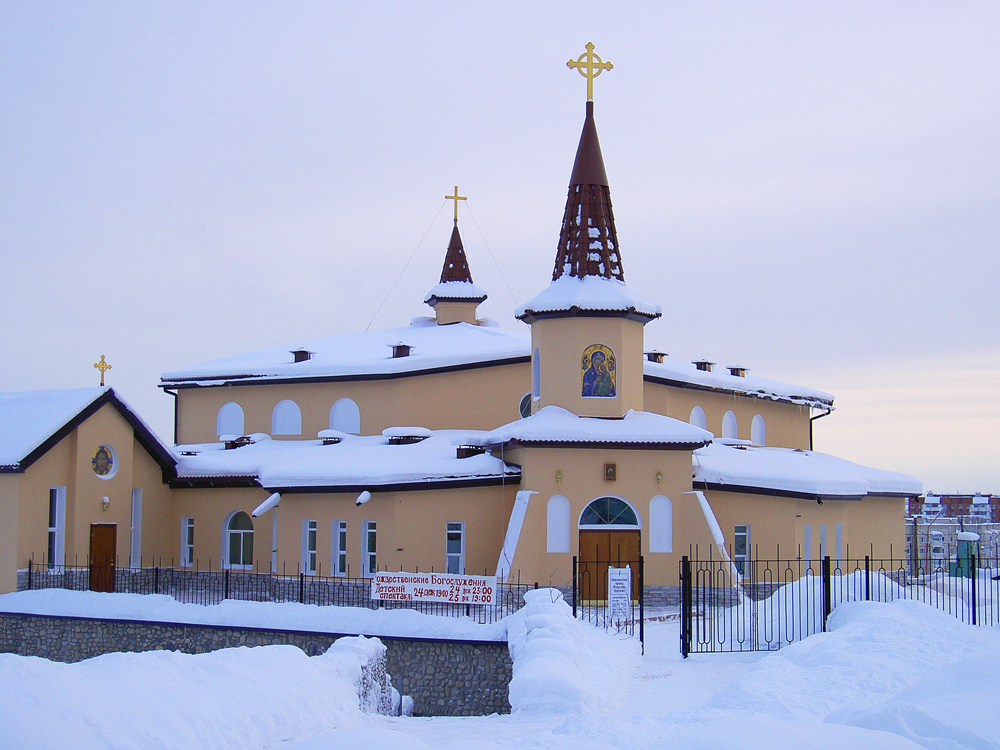
Church of the Nativity, Magadan

The Church of the Nativity at Magadan in the Russian Far East serves local Roman Catholics, many of whom survived Joseph Stalin's forced labor camps set up in the 1930s, 1940s and 1950s to exploit gold in Kolyma's harsh subarctic climate. Today the church stands both as a monument to the millions who died or suffered in the camps and as a source of inspiration for the local population.

The church was built largely through the efforts of Father Michael Shields of Anchorage, Alaska who went to Magadan in 1994 specifically to care for those who had suffered in the camps. There are close contacts between Magadan and Anchorage, its twin city. The church also serves the local Polish community.

The parish has about 250 registered parishioners, with 50-80 attending Sunday masses regularly.

== History ==
In January 1991, Archbishop of Anchorage Francis Thomas Hurley helped a small group of Russians establish the first Roman Catholic parish in the city of Magadan. For many years parishioners worshiped in a renovated apartment room. In 1994, Father Shields became pastor of the Parish of the Nativity but was seriously threatened in 1997 when the local authorities tried to prevent his work on the grounds that he was not Russian. Shields took the matter to court and, perhaps rather surprisingly, won the case.

In early 2001, Father Shields and his assistant Father David Means of St Louis found a piece of land suitable for the construction of a church. As a result of donations received after Fr Shields appeared on EWTN, the Catholic television network, the new building, which cost some $750,000, started to take shape. There were serious difficulties with some of the building contractors who had to be replaced before work could continue.

The central part of the structure was completed in 2002, just in time for Christmas mass to be celebrated there. Work on the interior continued in 2003 leading to the church's consecration by Bishop Kirill Klimovich of Irkutsk in 2004.

At January 2019, Father Shields was disallowed to enter Russia because of visa status complications.

Martyrs of Kolyma, Magadan

== Remembering the Martyrs ==
The church is closely linked to the Kolyma labor camps and those who died there. This is apparent in the icons created by Russian artist Svetlana Ryanitsyna (Светлана Ряницына, Moscow) especially those in the Martyrs' chapel entitled New Martyrs of Russia and Martyrs of Kolyma. The latter contains all the elements of the traditional Orthodox icon but the figures depict the new martyrs of the twentieth century. Further examples of the icons and artwork can be seen at the church's own website.

== Other missions ==
The Church of the Nativity contributes much to the Magadan community where it continues to serve former prisoners and other less fortunate residents, particularly alcoholics through its own Alcoholics Anonymous sessions. In addition, it has a mission in the coastal village of Ola, Russia, 35 km to the east, where it offers support to the indigenous people who are largely unemployed. There is also a mission in Sokol, near the local airport, offering help to those without employment, including ex-employees of bankrupt Magadan airways.
