= Magadanskaya Pravda =

Russian newspaper

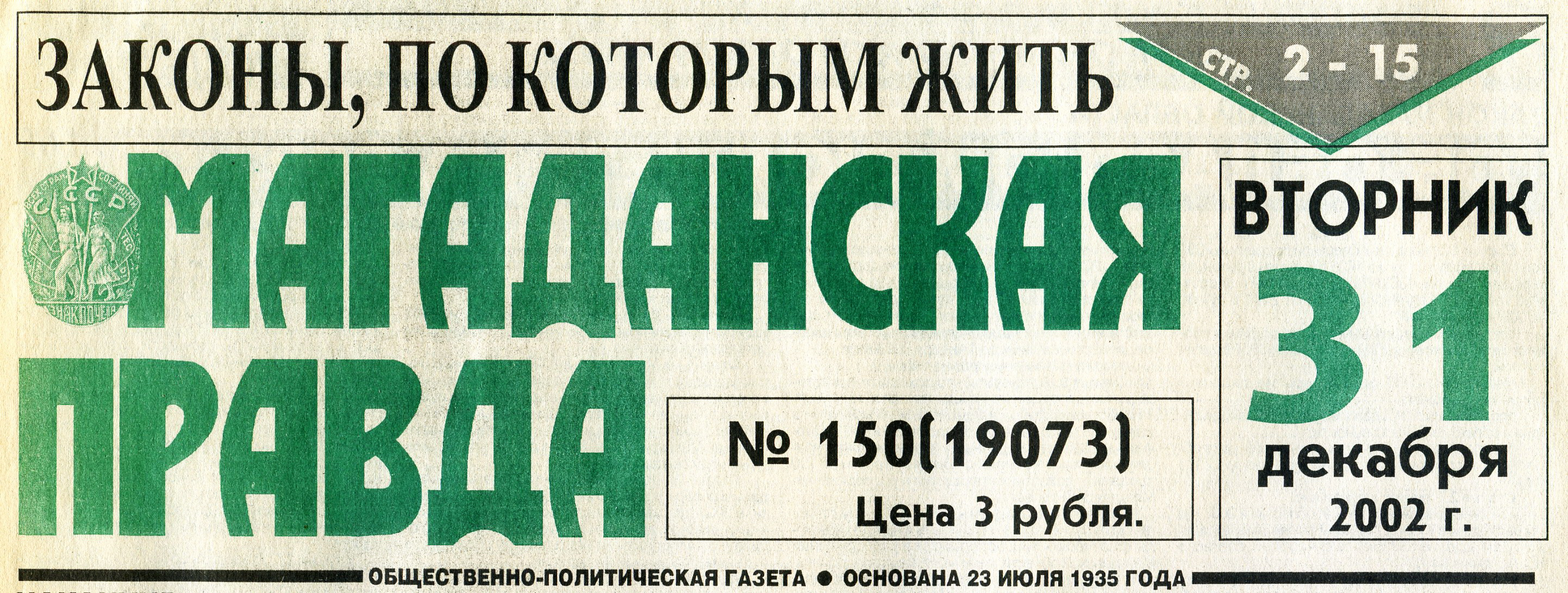
- Type: twice-weekly
- Publisher: ID "Magadanskaya Pravda"
- Editor-in-chief: Aleksandr Trifonov (Russian: Александр Владимирович Трифонов)
- Founded: 1932.10.01; 92 years ago
- Language: Russian
- Headquarters: Magadan
- Circulation: 20 000
- Website: http://magadanpravda.ru/

Magadanskaya Pravda (Russian: Магаданская правда) is a Russian regional socio-political twice-weekly newspaper, published in Magadan on Tuesday and Friday with a circulation of 10,000-20,000; it was established in 1932.

== Literature ==
- Essays, articles and documents from the history of the regional newspaper "Magadanskaya Pravda" = Газетной строкой...: Очерки, статьи, документы из истории областной газеты "Магаданская правда" / П. Ф. Бурмистров и др., сост. Т. П. Смолина. — Магадан: Магаданское книжное изд-во, 1986. — 224 p.
- The chronicle of journalism of the Magadan region = Свидетельствуем историю: летопись журналистики Магаданской области / сост. В. Кадцин. - Магадан: Кацубина Т. В., 2013. - 356 p. - ISBN 978-5-904983-16-1.
- Nataly Marchenko, Russian Arctic Seas: Navigational conditions and accidents. - Springer, 2012. - 274 p. - ISBN 9783642221248.
- Robert Valliant, Moscow and the Russian Far East. The political dimension // Politics and Economics in the Russian Far East: Changing Ties with Asia-Pacific / ed. Tsuneo Akaha. - Routledge, 2002. - 256 p. - ISBN 9781134710881.
- John Round, Rescaling Russia's Geography: The Challenges of Depopulating the Northern Periphery // Europe-Asia Studies, Vol. 57, No. 5 (Jul., 2005), pp. 705–727.
