= SS Dalstroy =

Soviet steam ship

The Soviet steamer Dalstroy was a cargo and passenger ship of the Soviet Union operated in the 1930s and 1940s delivering cargo and Gulag prisoners to Kolyma for the Soviet Dalstroy construction and mining trust. It is best known for its explosion in the port of Nakhodka.

== History ==
It was purchased from The Netherlands in 1935. Initially it was known as Almelo, launched in 1918. After the purchase it was renamed to Yagoda (Ягода), after Genrikh Yagoda, the chief of NKVD. It arrived to its port of registration Nagayevo on September 26, 1935. Its first (Soviet) captain was a comrade Gleizer (Глейзер). In 1937 or 1939 (sources differ), after Yagoda was arrested (eventually executed) it was renamed to Dalstroy.

On June 24, 1946 it was destroyed by catching fire and exploding in the harbour of Nakhodka while carrying a large load (750 to 900 metric tonnes) of explosives for mining works.
