= Nagayevo =

Nagayevo may refer to:

- Nagayevo, Magadan, one of the settlements—predecessors of the city of Magadan, Russia; now a port area in Magadan
- Nagayevo, Ivanovo Oblast, a village in Ivanovo Oblast, Russia
- Nagayevo, name of several other rural localities in Russia
