= Staritsky, Russia =

Staritsky (Russian: Старицкий; masculine), Staritskaya (Старицкая; feminine), or Staritskoye (Старицкое; neuter) is the name of several rural localities in Russia:

- Staritskoye, Orenburg Oblast, a selo in Klyuchevsky Selsoviet of Belyayevsky District of Orenburg Oblast
- Staritskoye, Saratov Oblast, a selo in Engelssky District of Saratov Oblast
- Staritskaya, a village in Sannikovsky Rural Okrug of Tobolsky District of Tyumen Oblast
