= Staritsky Peninsula =

Peninsula in the Sea of Okhotsk, Russian Far East

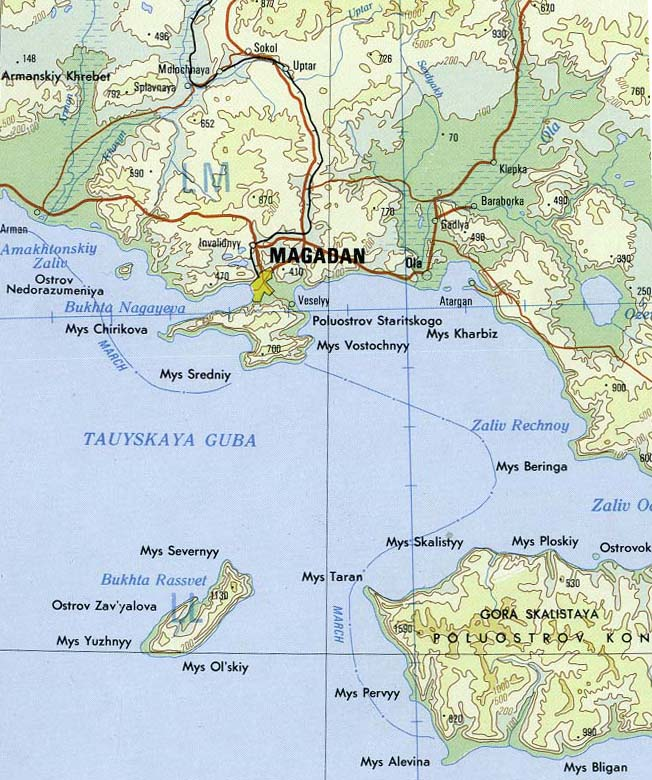
A map of the Magadan area, showing the Staritsky Peninsula

The Staritsky Peninsula (Russian: Полуостров Старицкого) projects into the Taui Bay of the Sea of Okhotsk in Magadan Oblast, Russian Far East immediately south of Magadan, which occupies the isthmus of the peninsula.

== History ==
Before 1875 the isthmus was known as the Miyekan Peninsula after the local even's name Miyekan for the Nagayev Bay. In 1875 the hydrographer Mikhail Onatsevich mapped the local shores and named the peninsula after the Russian captain and hydrologist Konstantin Staritsky.

== Geography ==
The peninsula is separated from the mainland by the smaller Nagayev Bay on the west and Gertner Bay on the east.

There is the Vesyolaya Bay south of the Gertner Bay, separated from it by Cape Krasny (Russian: мыс Красный).

There also is the Svetlaya Bay south of the Nagayav Bay separated from it by a promontory ending with the Cape Chirikov (Russian: мыс Чирикова). The coastline of the Svetlaya Bay is a special protected area.

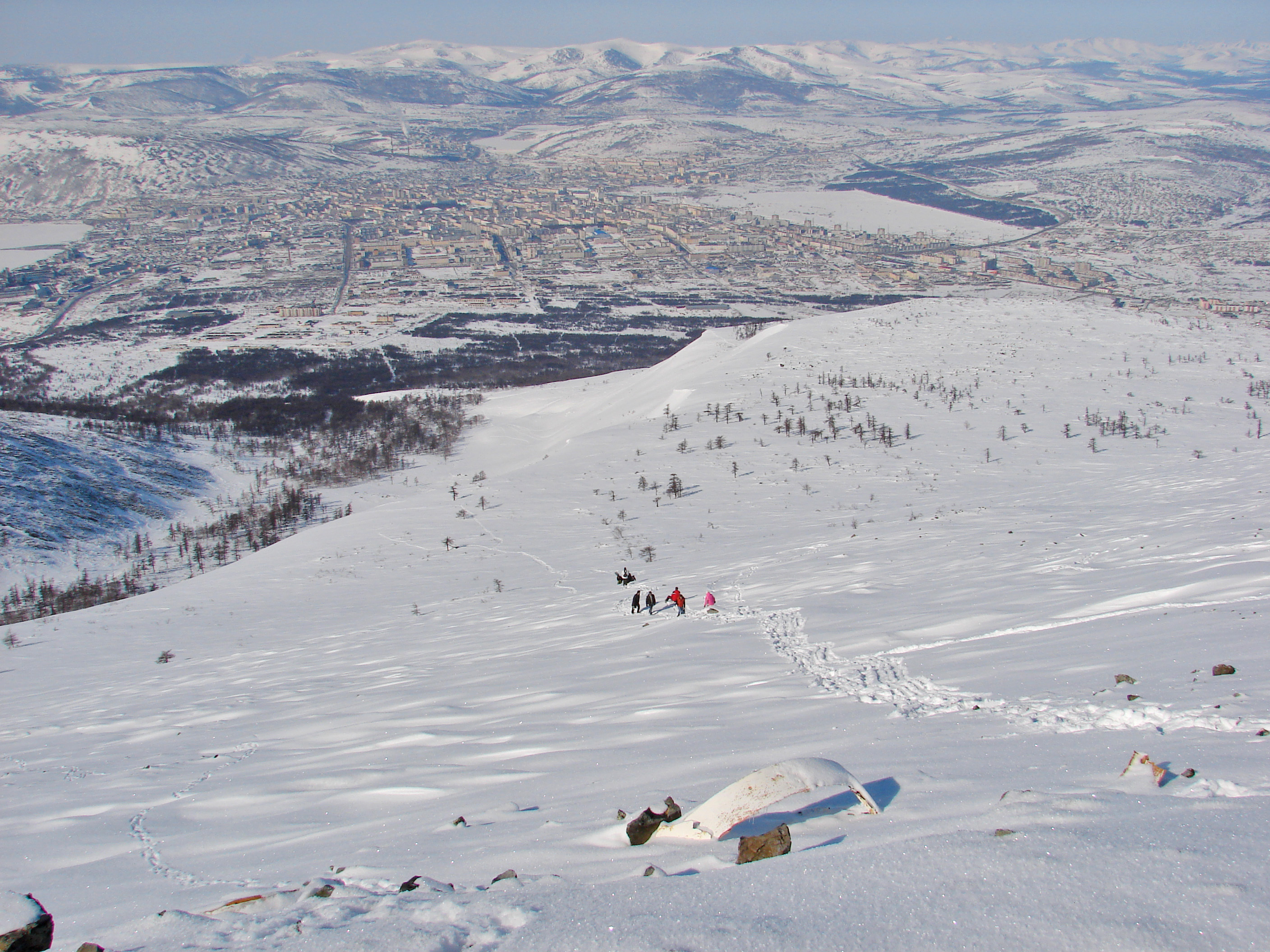
A view on Magadan from the northern slope of Marchekanskaya Sopka

Its highest point is Marchekanskaya Sopka (59°30′34″N 150°49′27″E), elevation 694m, prominence 625m.
