= Nagayevo, Magadan =

Nagayevo Нагаево
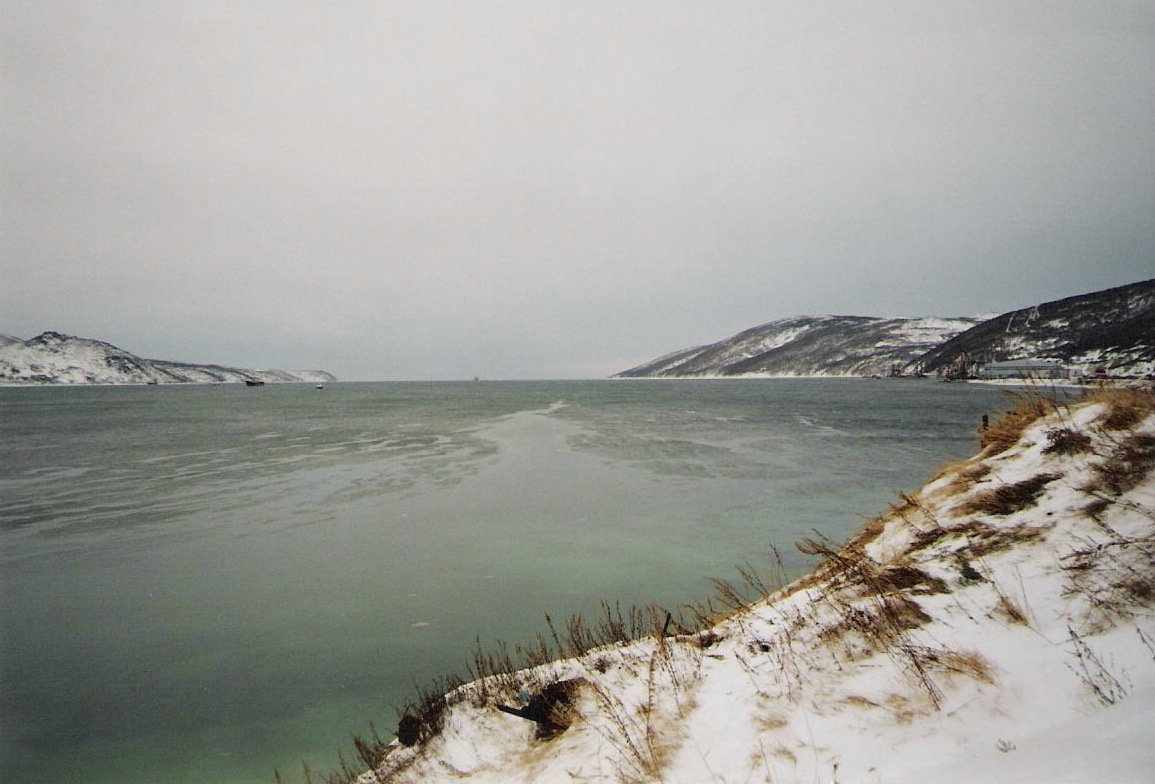
- View of Nagayev Bay
- Interactive map of Nagayevo
- Location of Nagayevo Nagayevo (Magadan Oblast)
- Coordinates: 59°33′N 150°47′E
- Country: Russia
- Federal subject: Magadan Oblast
- Founded: 1929
- Current status since: 1939

Municipal status
  - Municipal district: Now part of Port of Magadan

Nagayevo (Russian: Нага́ево) was an urban-type settlement on the shore of Nagayev Bay of the Sea of Okhotsk in what later became present day Magadan Oblast, in the Russian Far East.

Presently, Nagayevo is a microdistrict in and the port area of the city of Magadan, the administrative center of Magadan Oblast.

== History ==
Nagayevo was a predecessor of the present day city of Magadan. It was founded in 1929 on the shore of Nagayev Bay of the Sea of Okhotsk as part of a plan for the establishment of an East Even Cultural Base (Восточно-Эвенская культбаза). Among the structures built, there were three residential buildings, a school, a veterinary station, a hospital, a bathhouse and a boarding school. It rapidly grew, and in 1930 it was granted urban-type settlement status. In 1931, it became the administrative center of Okhotsk-Evenk National Okrug. The East Even Cultural Base was disbanded in 1931, but the Kamchatka Joint-Stock Company (AKO) erected a building. More ships entered the harbor and the area continued developing, paving the way for modern Magadan. Some of the East Even Cultural Base buildings survived well into the 1980s.

In 1932, the Settlement of Magadan was founded just 2.5 kilometers (1.6 mi) from Nagayevo, also on the coast. In 1939, they were both merged into the new Town of Magadan.

== See also ==
- Ports and harbours of the Russian Pacific Coast
- Cities and towns built in the Soviet Union
