= Magadan =

City in Magadan Oblast, Russia

Magadan Магадан
- Town
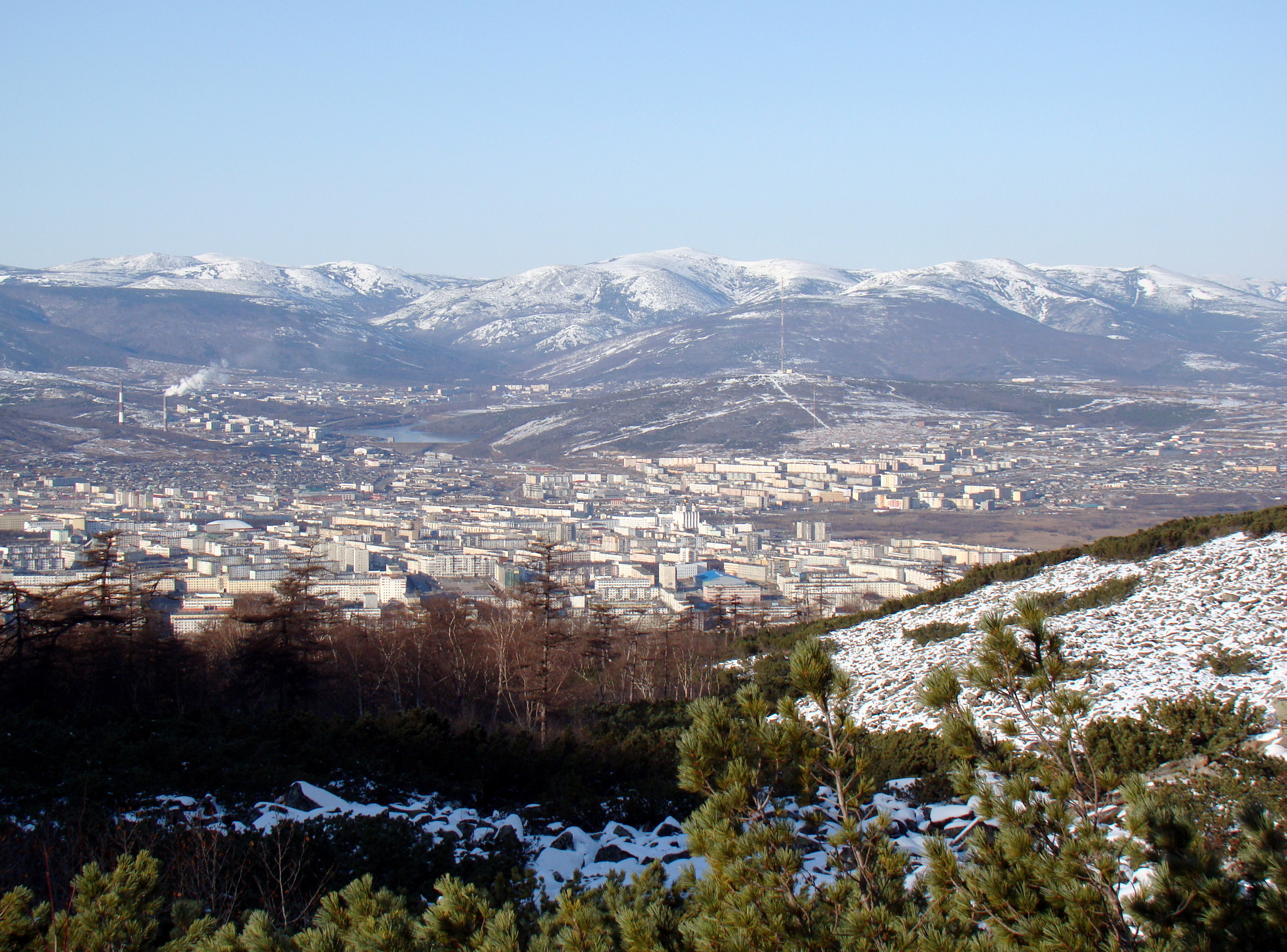
- Magadan seen from the local mountains

- Flag Coat of arms
- Anthem: none
- Interactive map of Magadan
- Location of Magadan Magadan (Magadan Oblast)
- Coordinates: 59°34′N 150°48′E
- Country: Russia
- Federal subject: Magadan Oblast
- Founded: 1929
- Town status since: July 14, 1939

Government
  - Body: Town Duma
  - Head/Mayor: Andrey Popov (Head), Larisa Olegovna Polikanova (Mayor)

Area
  - Total: 295 km^{2} (114 sq mi)
- Elevation: 70 m (230 ft)

Population (2010 Census)
  - Total: 95,982
  - Estimate (2025): 89,193 (−7.1%)
  - Rank: 178th in 2010
  - Density: 325/km^{2} (843/sq mi)

Administrative status
  - Subordinated to: town of oblast significance of Magadan
  - Capital of: Magadan Oblast, town of oblast significance of Magadan

Municipal status
  - Urban okrug: Magadan Urban Okrug
  - Capital of: Magadan Urban Okrug
- Time zone: UTC+11 (MSK+8)
- Postal codes: 685000–685005, 685007, 685017, 685021, 685024, 685030–685031, 685098–685099, 685700, 685960–685961
- Dialing code: +7 4132
- OKTMO ID: 44701000001
- Town Day: July 14; observed on the third Saturday of July
- Website: magadangorod.ru

Magadan (Russian: Магадан, IPA: [məɡɐˈdan]) is a port town and the administrative centre of Magadan Oblast, Russia. The city is located on the isthmus of the Staritsky Peninsula by the Nagaev Bay; it serves as a gateway to the Kolyma region.

Magadan, founded in 1929, was a major transit centre for political prisoners during the Stalin era and the administrative centre of the Dalstroy forced-labor gold mining operation. The town later served as a port for exporting gold and other metals. Magadan plays a significant role in transportation with the Port of Magadan and Sokol Airport.

The local economy relies on gold mining and fisheries, although gold production has declined. The town has various cultural institutions and religious establishments, such as the Orthodox Holy Trinity Cathedral and the Roman Catholic Church of the Nativity. The Mask of Sorrow memorial commemorates Stalin's victims. Magadan experiences a subarctic climate with prolonged and cold winters, causing the soil to remain permanently frozen.

== History ==
The settlement of Magadan was founded in 1929 in the Ola river valley, near the settlement of Nagayevo. During the Stalin era, Magadan was a major transit centre for inmates sent to Gulag forced labour camps. From 1932 to 1953, it was the administrative centre of the Dalstroy organisation—a vast forced-labour gold-mining operation and forced-labour camp system. The first director of Dalstroy was Eduard Berzin, who between 1932 and 1937 established the infrastructure of the forced labour camps in Magadan. Berzin was executed in 1938 by Stalin, towards the end of the Great Purge.

The town later served as a port for exporting gold and other metals mined in the Kolyma region. Its size and population grew quickly as facilities were rapidly developed for the expanding mining activities in the area. City status was granted to it on July 14, 1939.

Magadan was visited by U.S. Vice President Henry Wallace in May 1944. He later glowingly called the town a combination of Tennessee Valley Authority and Hudson's Bay Company.

== Administrative and municipal status ==
Magadan is the administrative centre of the Magadan Oblast. Within the framework of administrative divisions, it is, together with the urban-type settlements of Sokol and Uptar, incorporated as the "town of oblast significance of Magadan"—an administrative unit with the status equal to that of the districts. As a municipal division, the town of oblast significance of Magadan is incorporated as Magadan Urban Okrug.

== Economy and infrastructure ==
Historical population
Year	Pop.	±%
1939	27,313	—
1959	62,225	+127.8%
1970	92,105	+48.0%
1979	121,250	+31.6%
1989	151,652	+25.1%
2002	99,399	−34.5%
2010	95,982	−3.4%
2021	90,757	−5.4%
Source: Census data

=== Transport ===
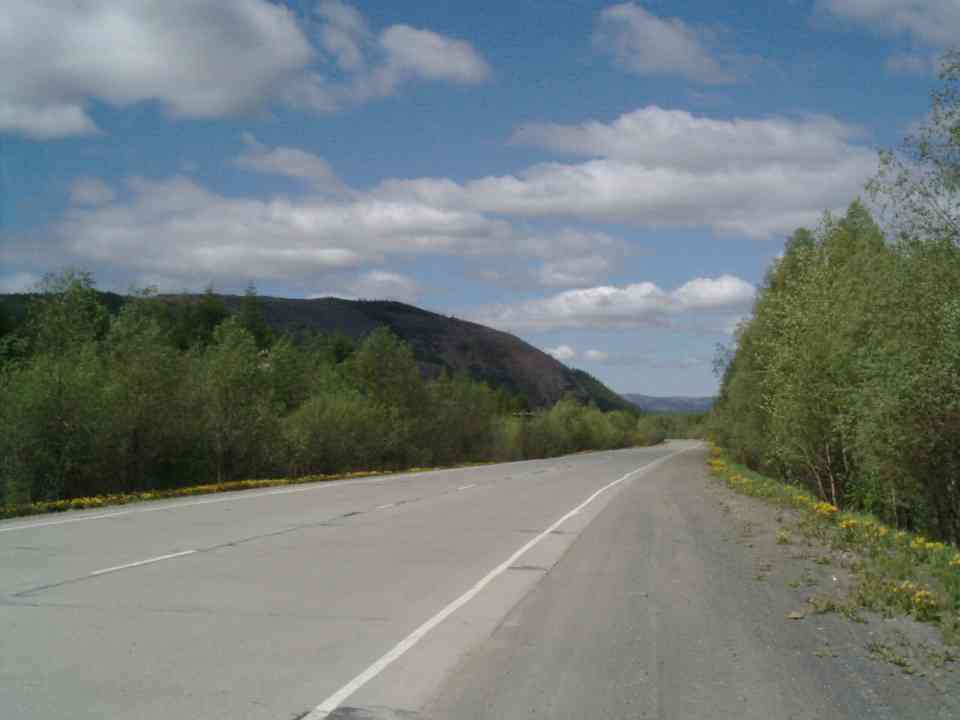
R504 Kolyma Highway near Magadan

R504 Kolyma Highway

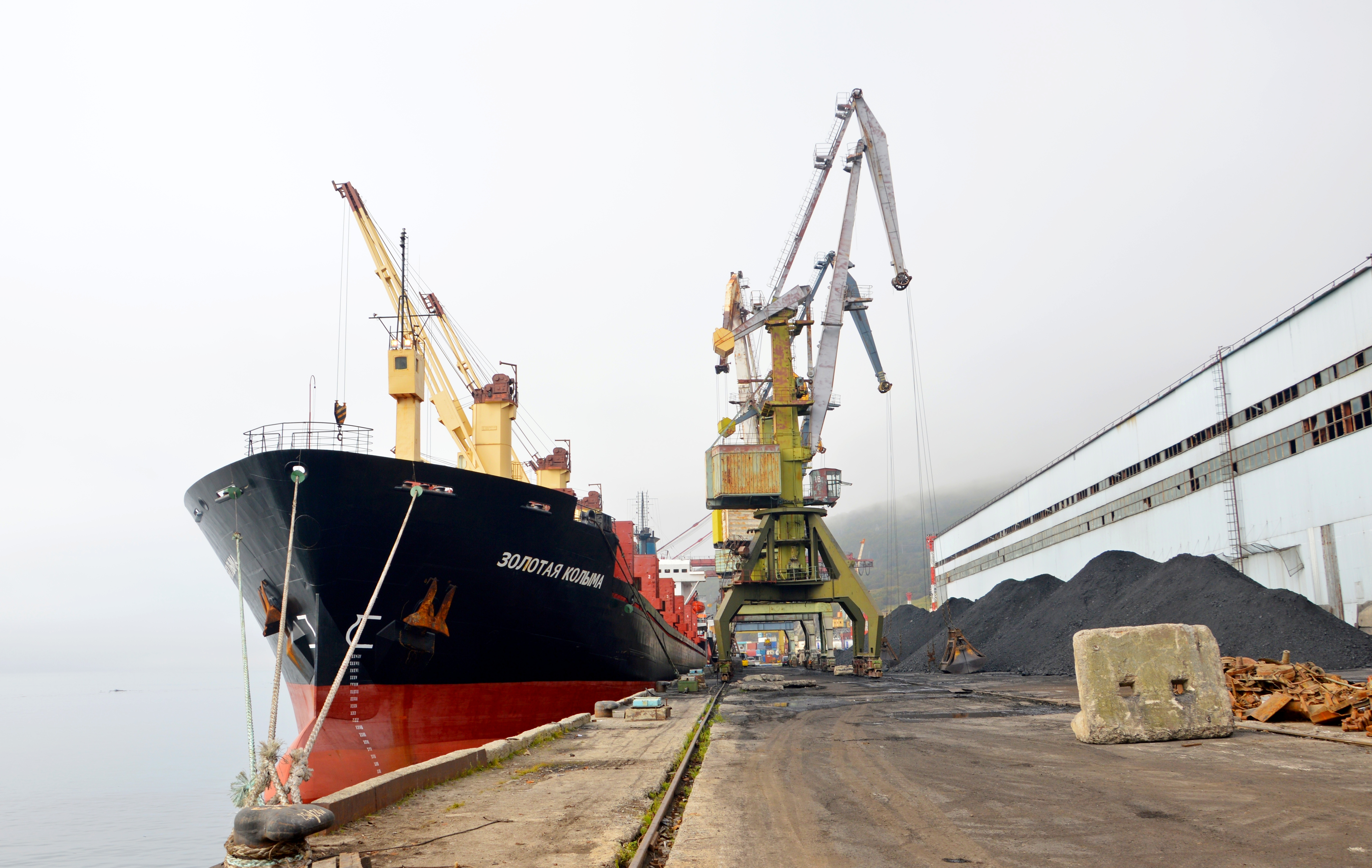
Port of Magadan

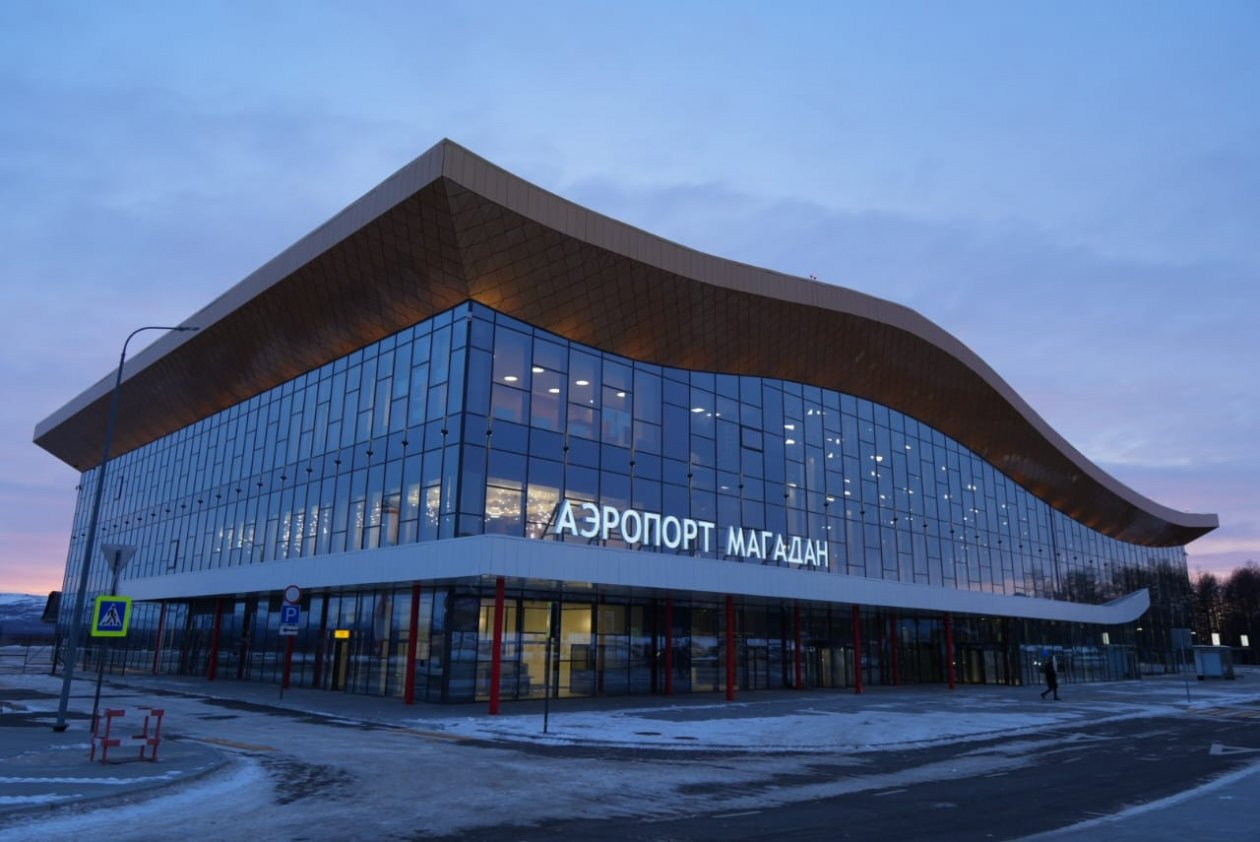
Sokol Airport

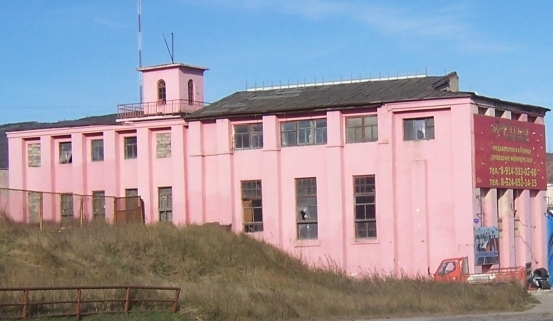
former Train Station of Magadan-Palatka line

The Port of Magadan is the second largest seaport in the North-East of Russia after Petropavlovsk-Kamchatsky located on Nagaev Bay and Sea of Okhotsk. It operates all year round with the help of icebreakers. There is currently no operating railway in Magadan. However, the Magadan-Palatka line was operational between 1941 and 1956. Russian Railways are considering the possibility of building a railway from the Nizhny Bestyakh of the Amur-Yakutsk railway to Magadan by 2035, which will contribute to the development of an area with huge mineral deposits. Magadan is the final destination of the federal highway R504 Kolyma Highway, which connects the region with Yakutia and other parts of Russia. Anadyr Highway, currently under construction, will provide access to Chukotka Autonomous Okrug. Sokol Airport and Magadan-13 airport provide access to air transport for numerous destinations in Russia with the former being for big aircraft and the latter is mainly for small aircraft.

Magadan is also the home of the Magadan/Sokol Flight Information Region (FIR) and Magadan Oceanic FIR, which controls the Northeastern part of the Russia and its Arctic airspace. Most of the westbound transpacific flights from North America to Asia will use those FIRs.

=== Economy ===
The principal sources of income for the local economy are gold mining and fisheries. By 2007, gold production had declined. Fishing production declined and was well below the allocated quotas, apparently as a result of an aging fishing fleet. Other local industries include pasta and sausage plants, and a distillery.

Farming is difficult owing to the area's climate, and Magadan has one of the Russian Far East's lowest rates of agricultural self-sufficiency. Arable farms in the 21st century may see varied crop yields from one year to another, depending on temperatures and weather conditions.

=== Other ===
The Central Intelligence Agency wrote a report on Ship Repair Yard No. 2 near Magadan in June 1965. Magadan was repeatedly reported as a base for the Soviet Navy during the Cold War.

== Culture and religion ==
=== Culture ===
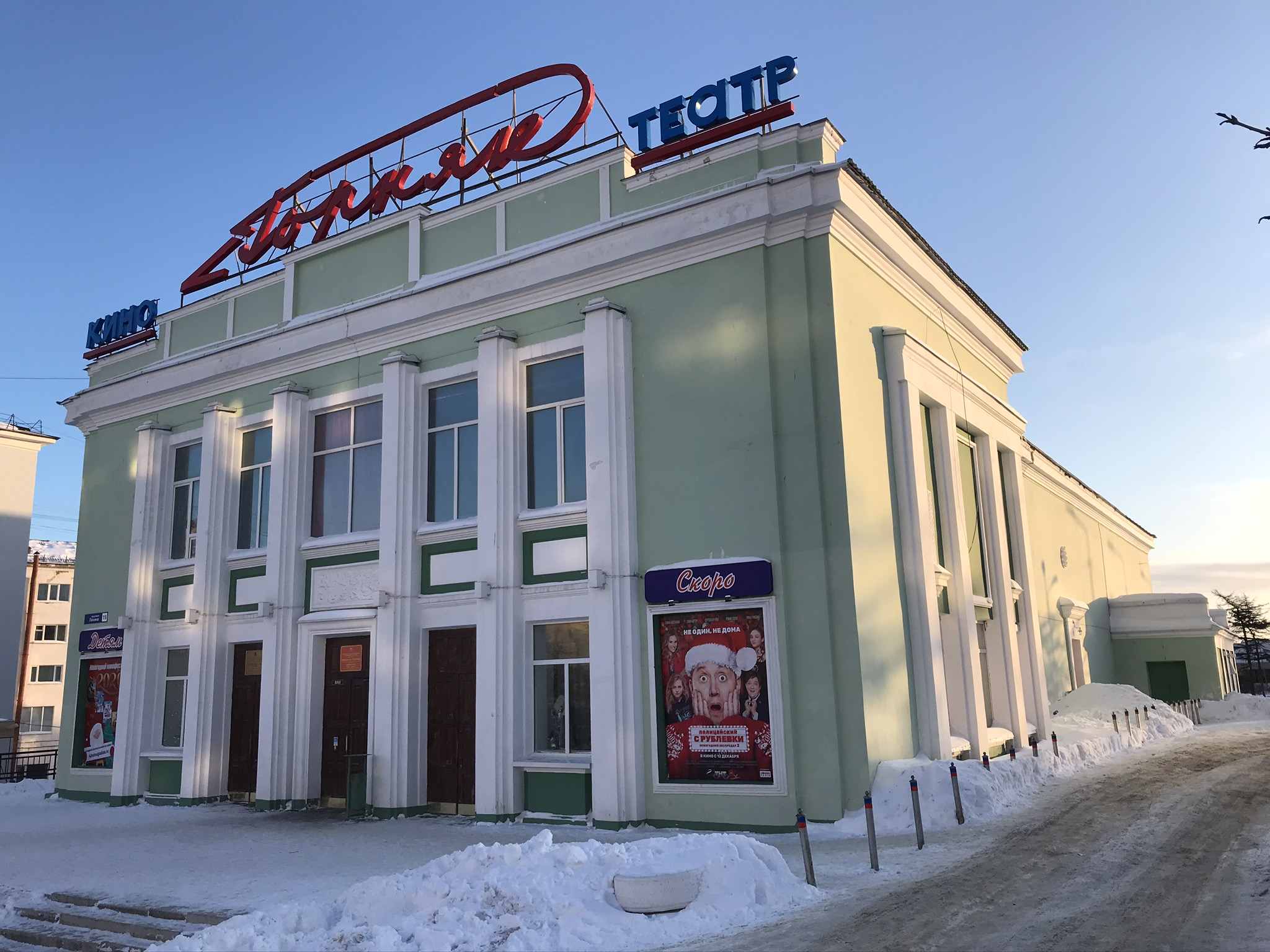
Gornyak Cinema

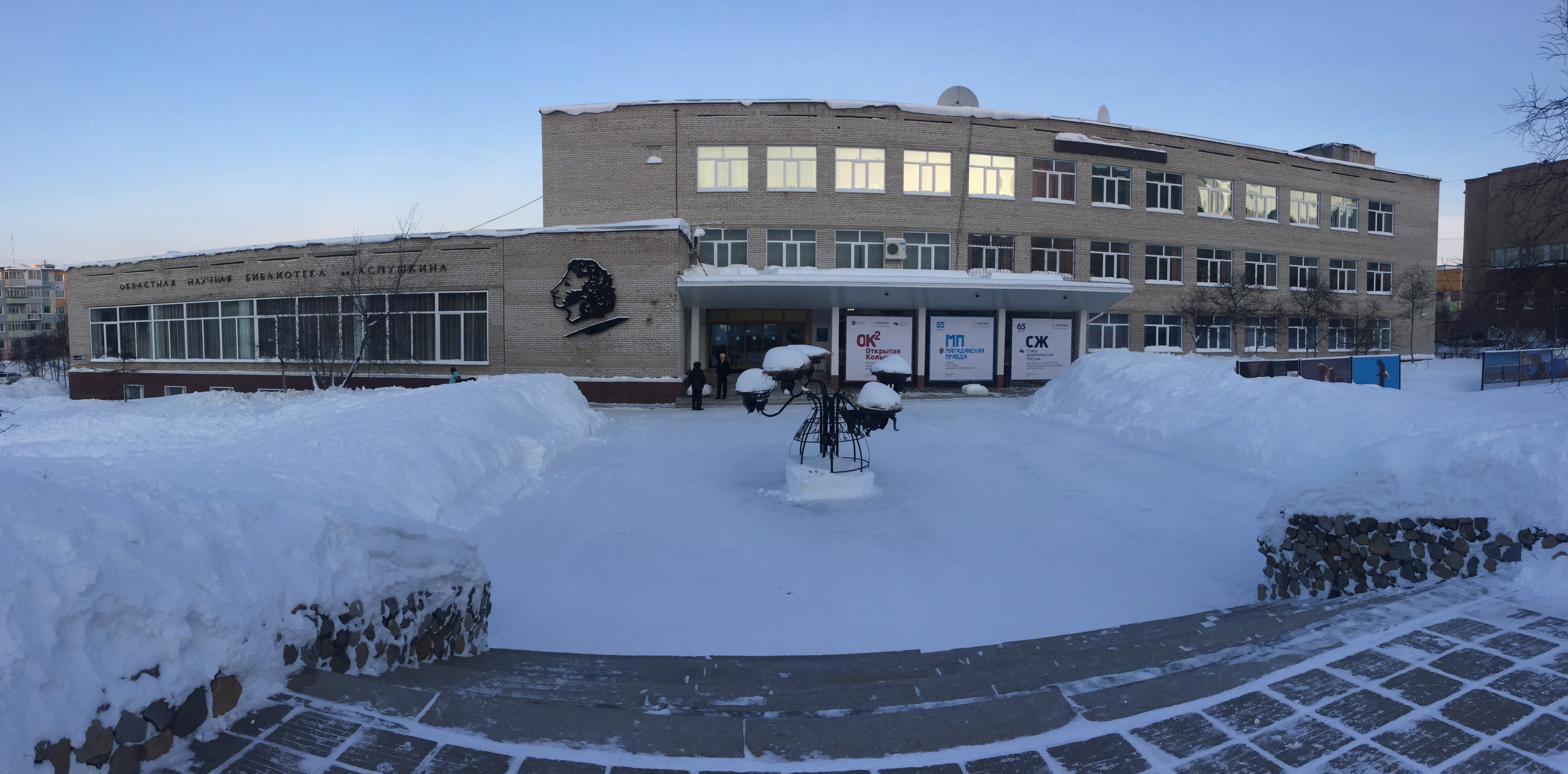
Pushkin Library

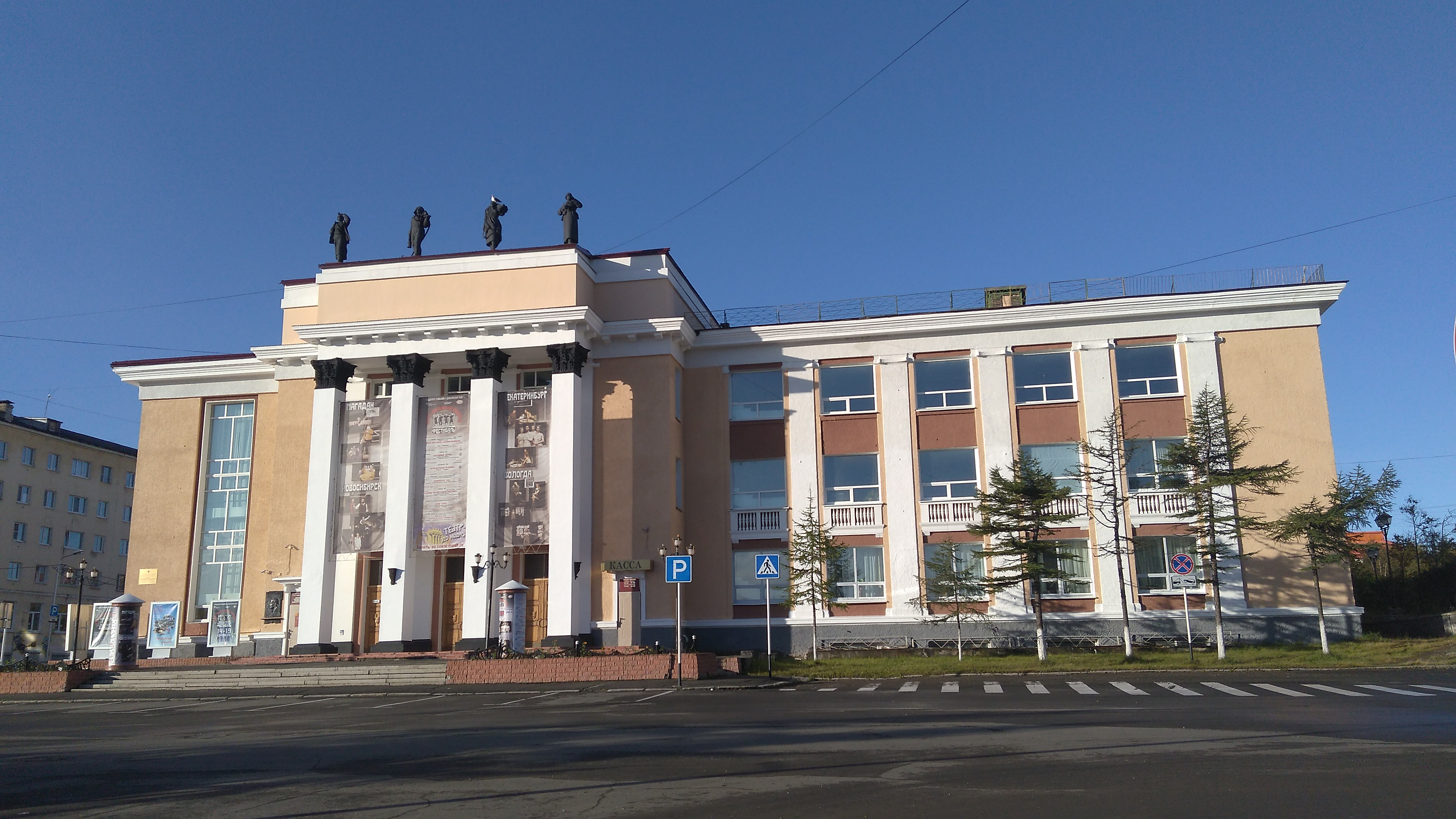
Magadan Theatre

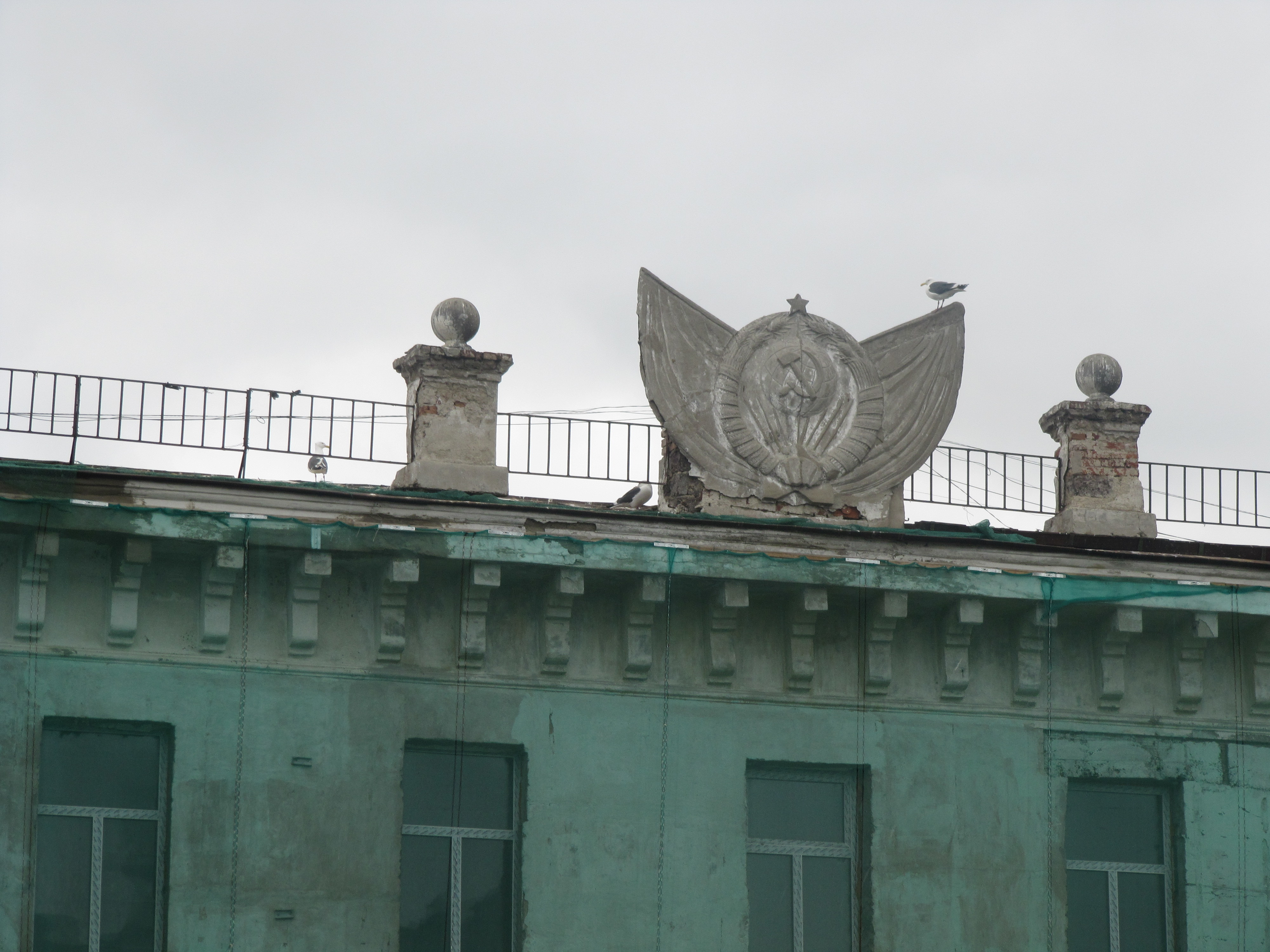
Magadan Hotel

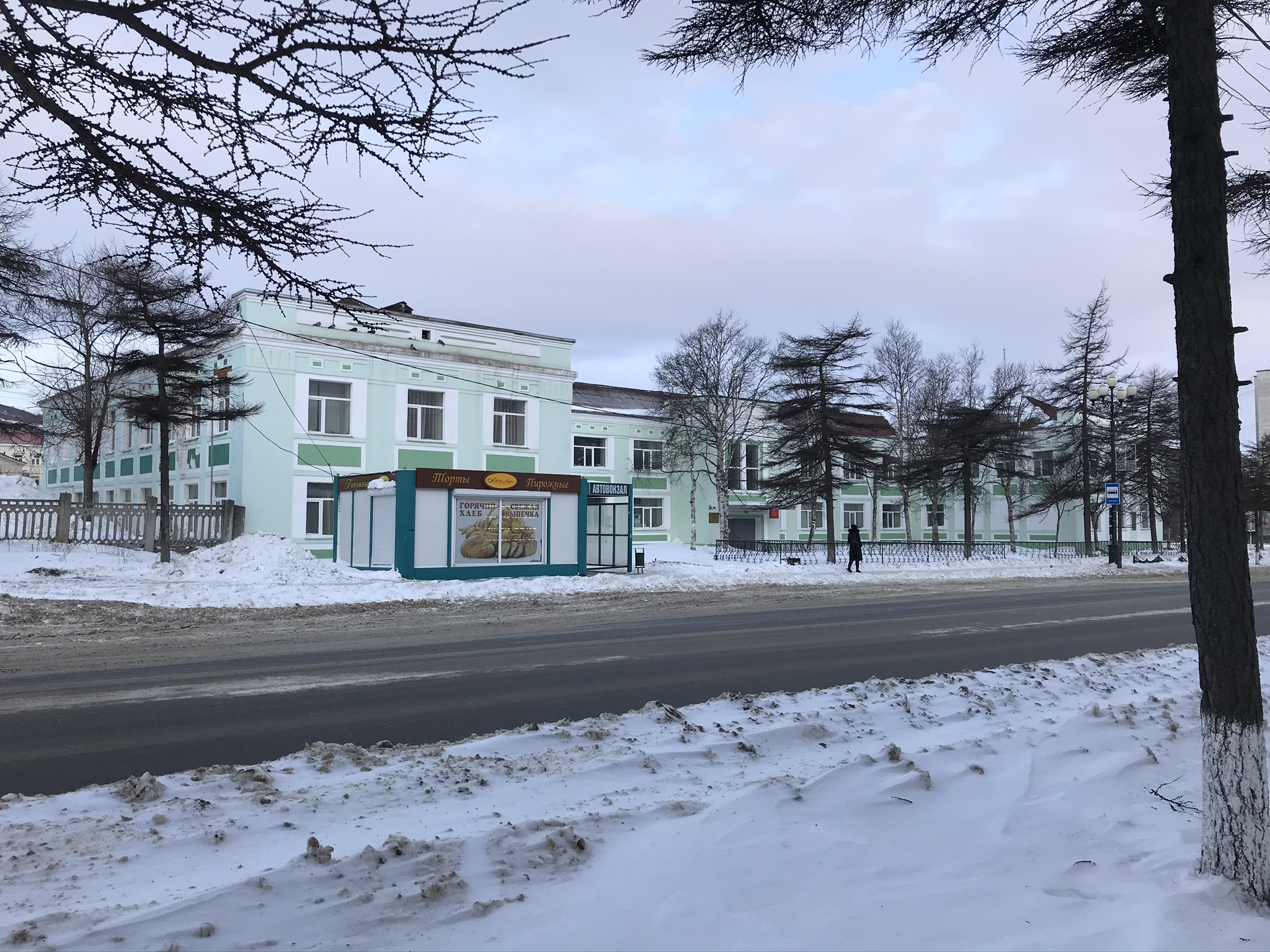
Polytechnic Magadan

Magadan contains a number of cultural and educational institutions, including the Regional Museum of Anthropology, a geological museum, a regional library, and a university. It is served by local newspaper Magadanskaya Pravda.

=== In art and media ===
The town features in the gulag literature of Varlam Shalamov, and inspired an eponymous song by Mikhail Krug. Actor of film and stage Georgiy Zhzhonov worked at Magadan Theatre for two years after being released from a gulag in May 1945. Magadan was also home to Eastern Syndrome, a Soviet and Russian rock group active in the 1980s. In 2004, Magadan featured in the Long Way Round television series, documenting a motorcycle journey made by Ewan McGregor and Charley Boorman.

=== Religion ===
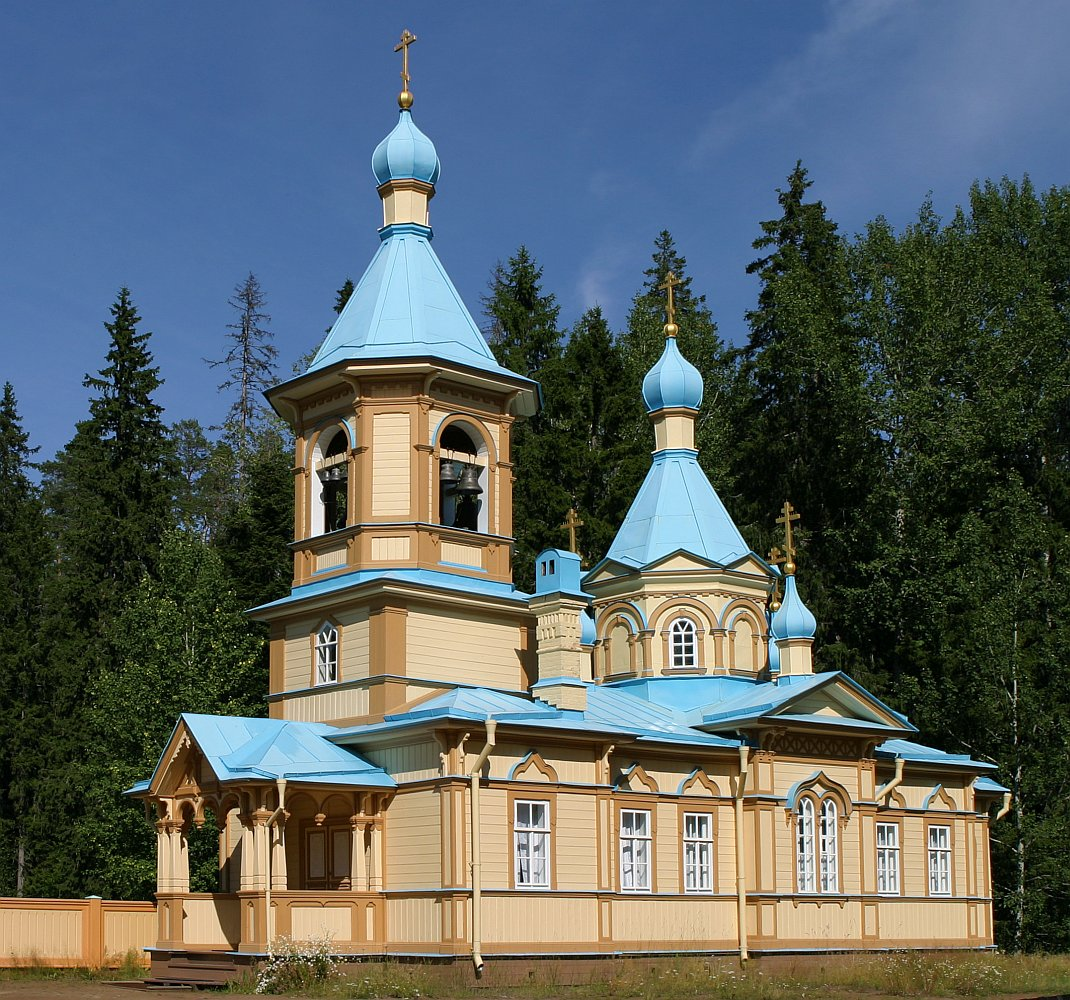
Church of St. Sergius of Radonezh

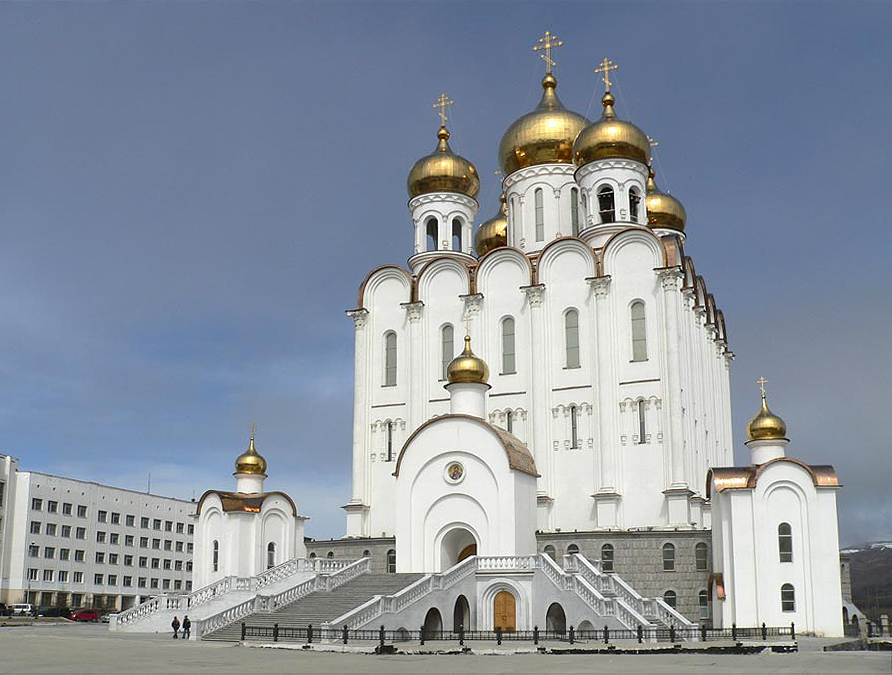
Cathedral of the Life-Giving Trinity

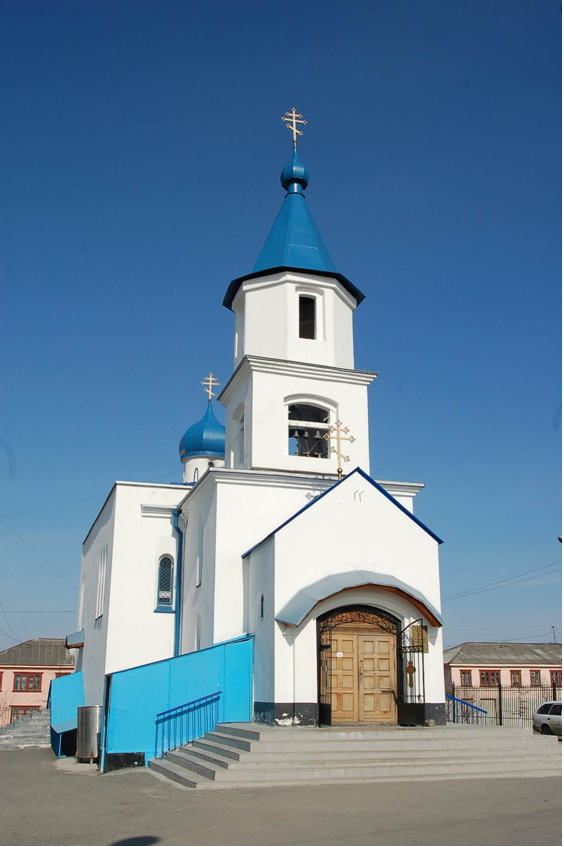
Cathedral of the Holy Spirit

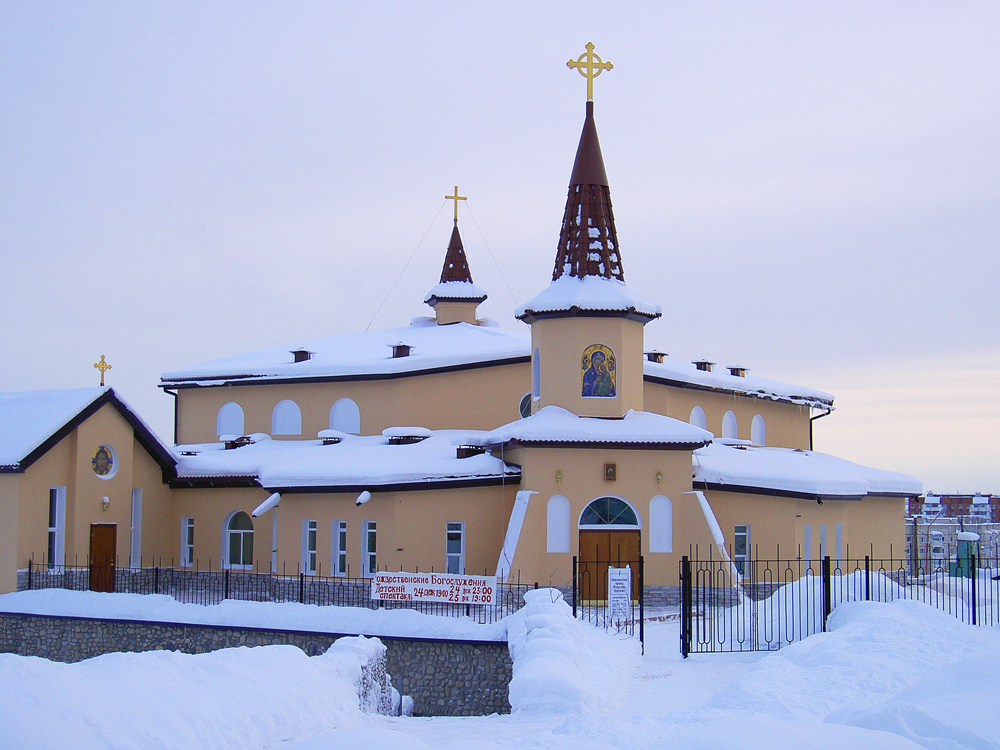
Church of the Nativity

The town features the recent Orthodox Cathedral of the Life-Giving Trinity (completed in 2008), and the Roman Catholic Church of the Nativity (completed in 2002), among others.

=== Memorials ===
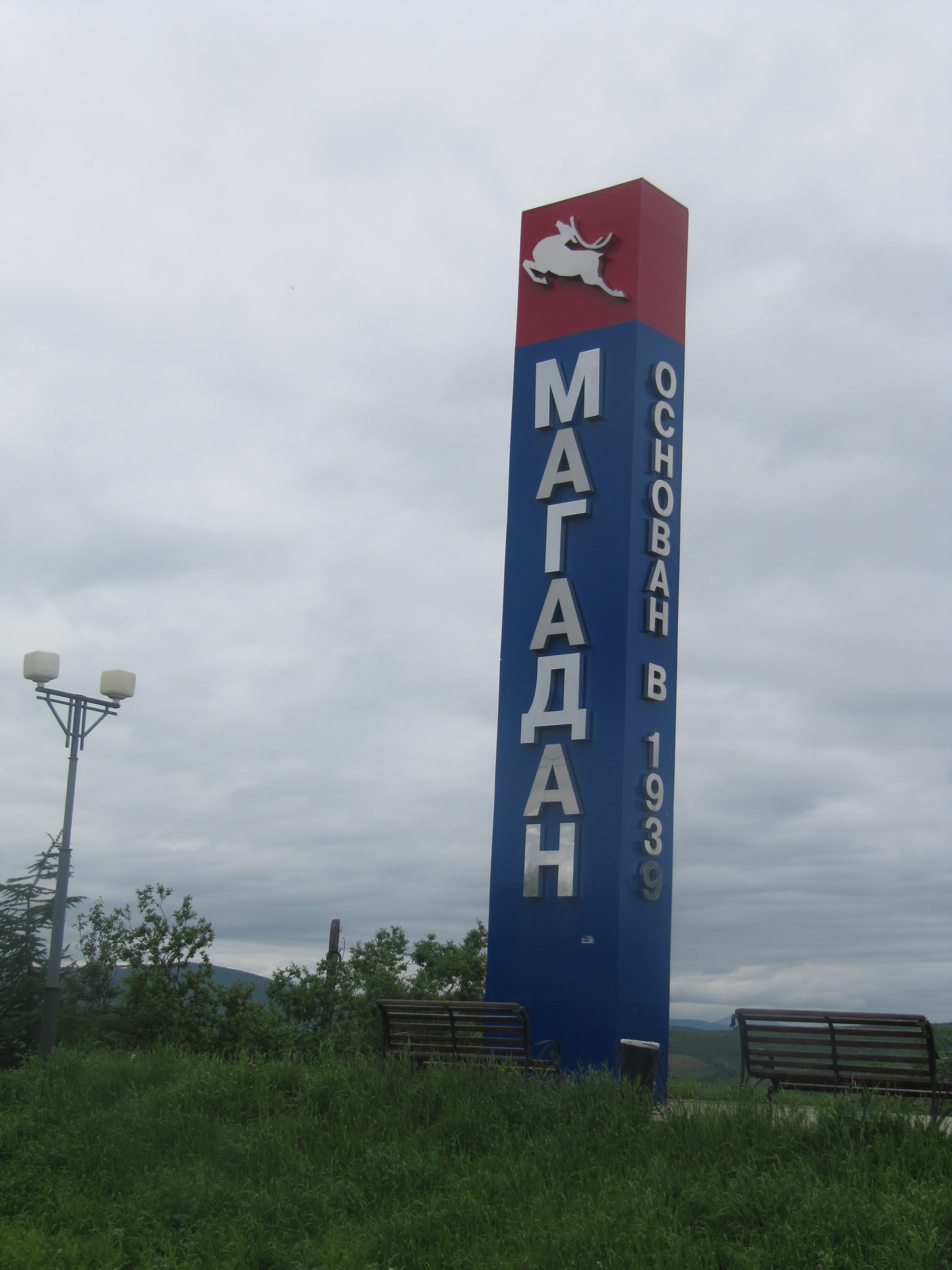
City entrance stele

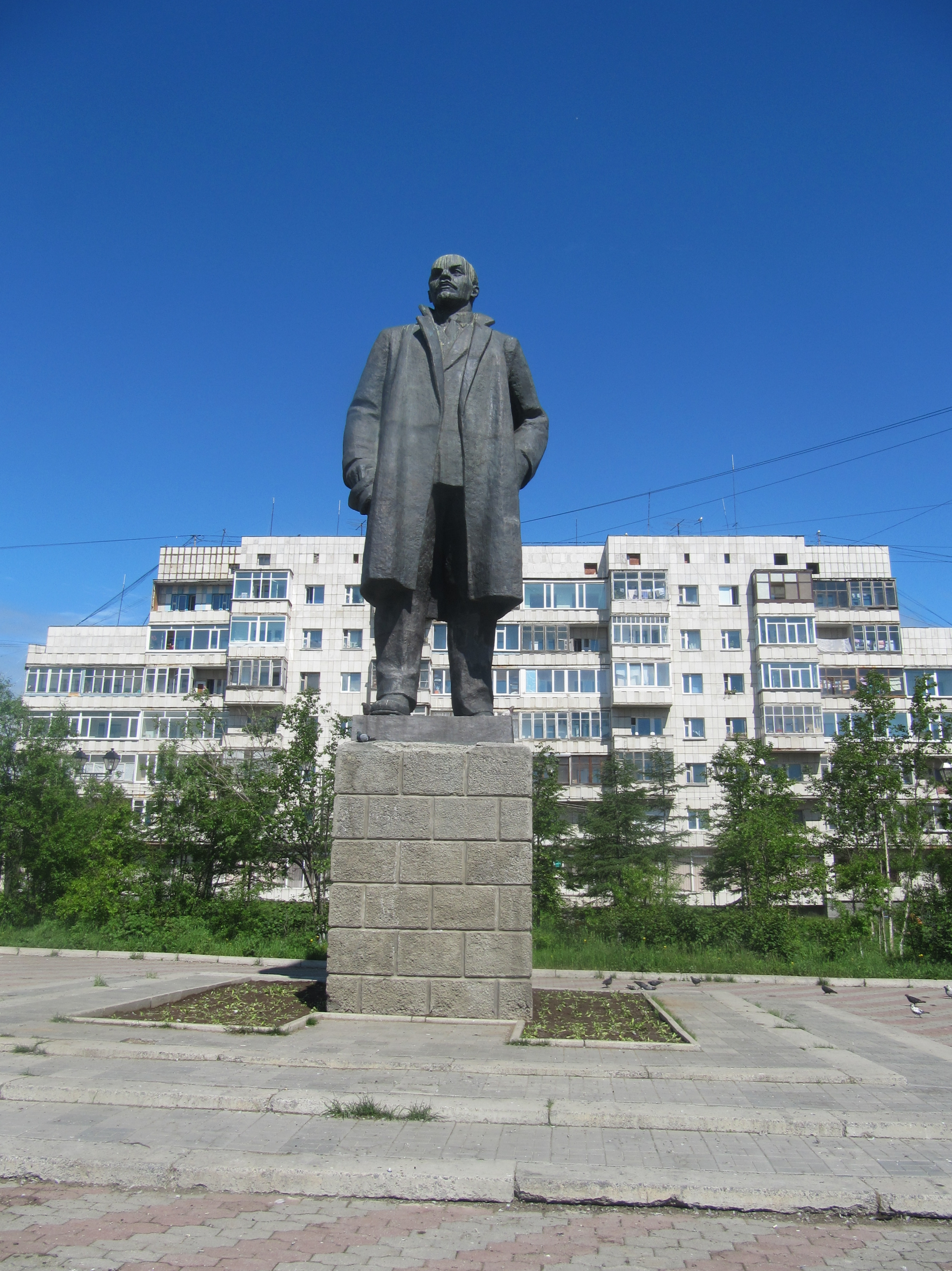
Lenin monument (2011)

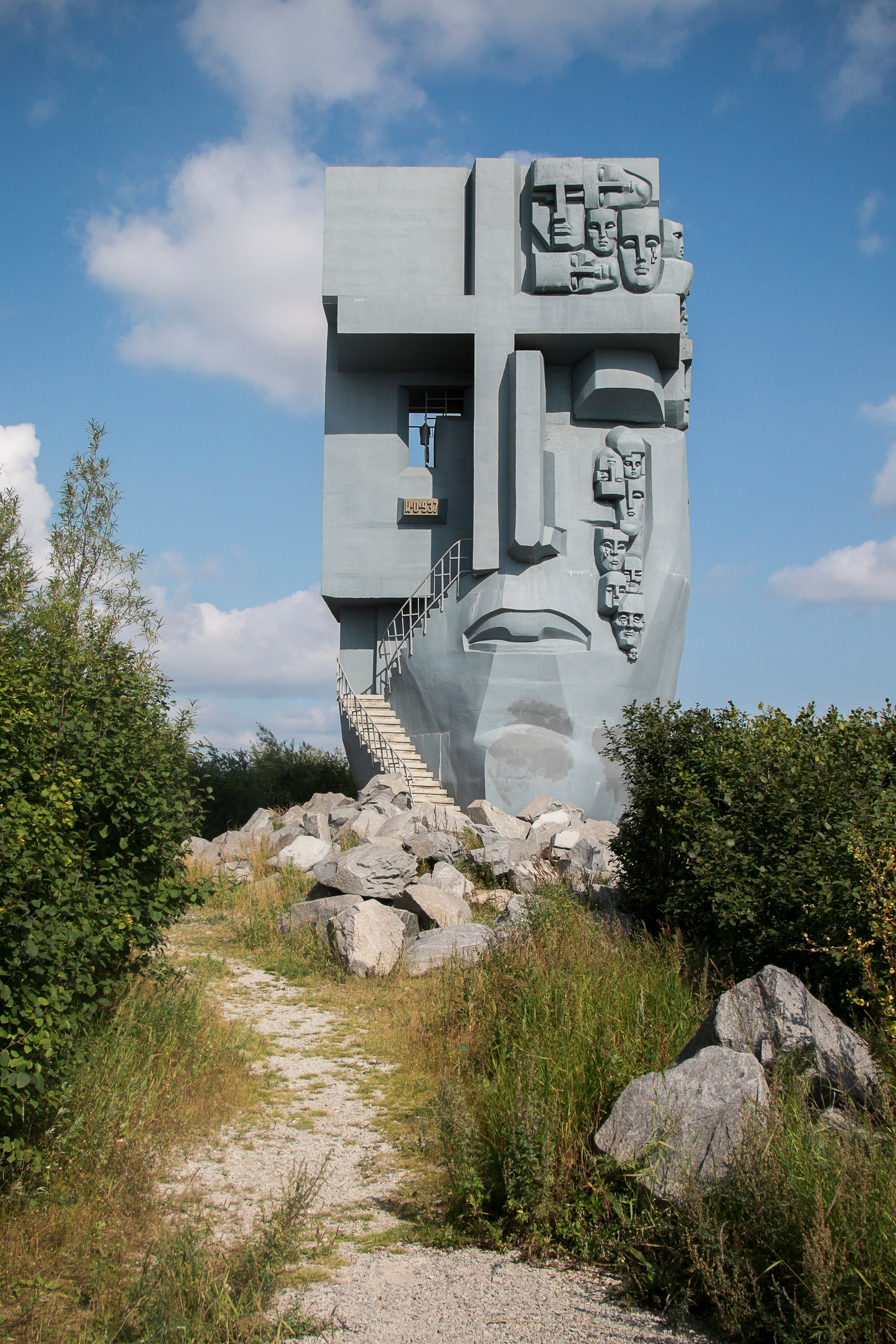
Mask of Sorrow

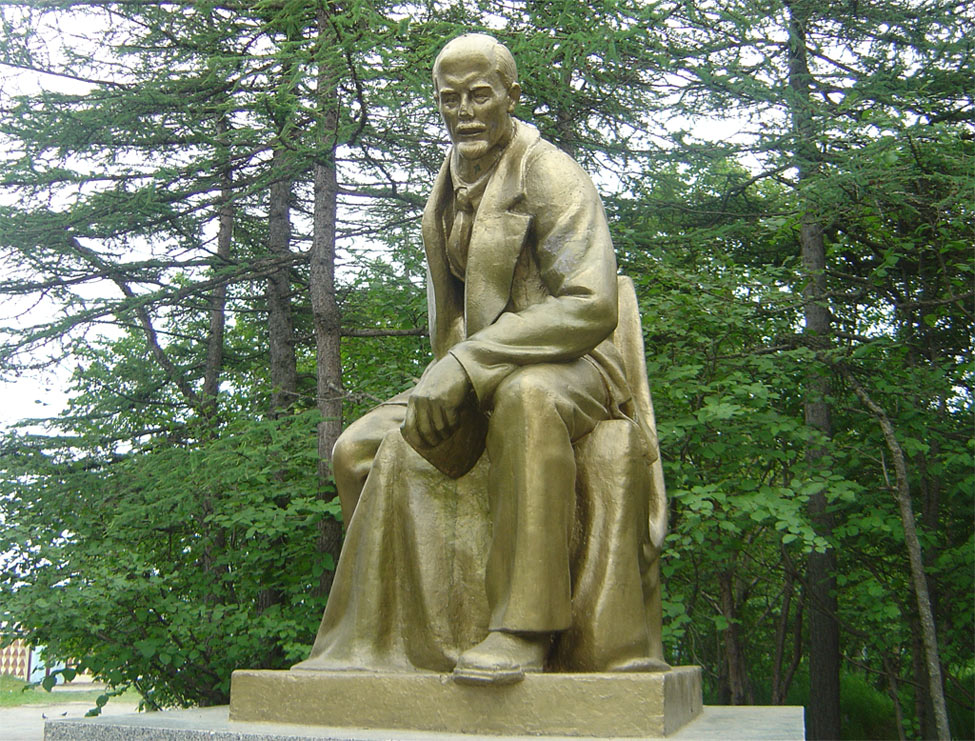
Lenin monument (2008)

The Mask of Sorrow memorial, a large sculpture in memory of Stalin's victims, was designed by Ernst Neizvestny. The Church of the Nativity ministers to survivors of the labor camps. It is staffed by several priests and nuns.

=== Sport ===
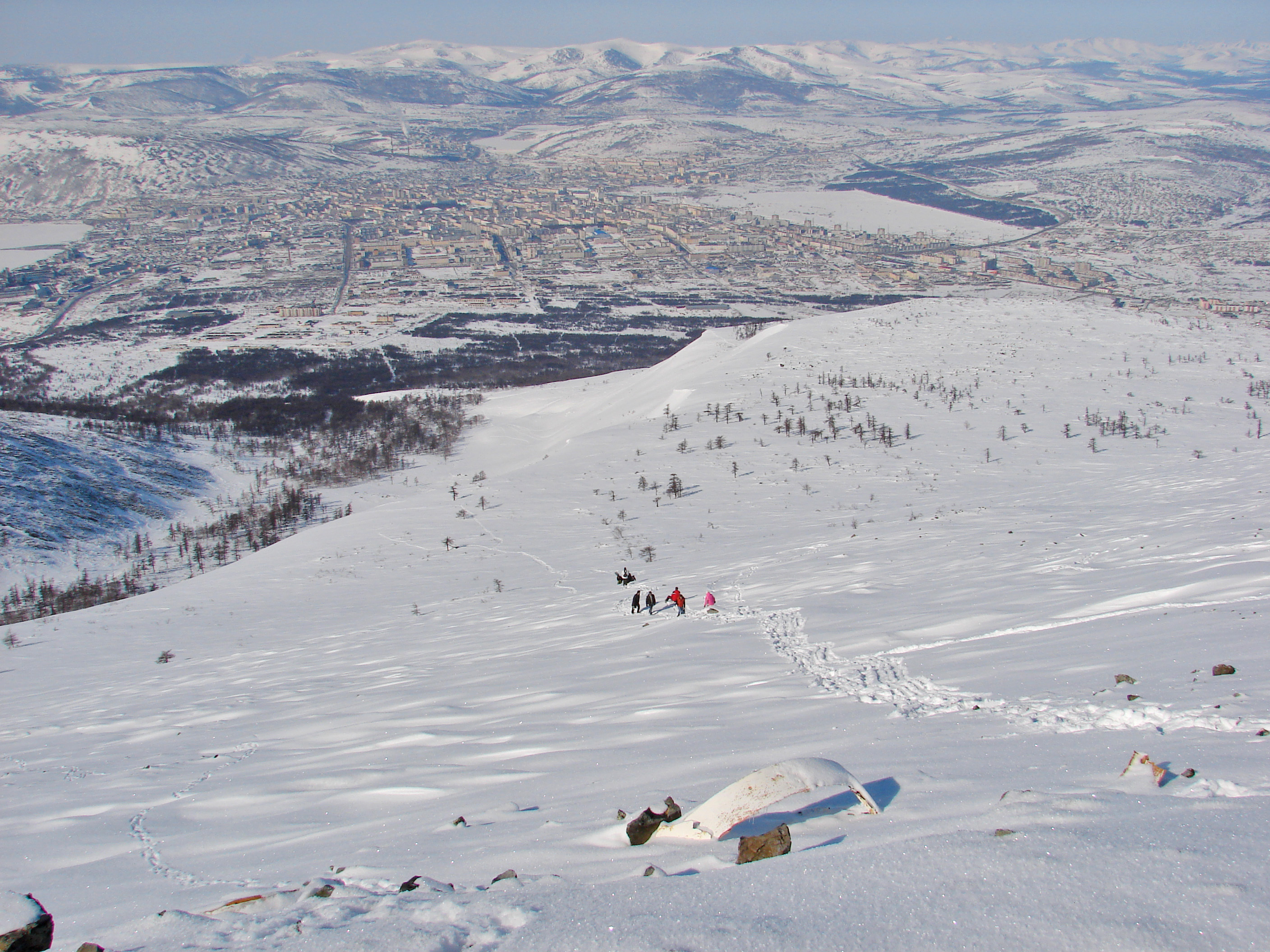
Hiking in Marchekanskaya

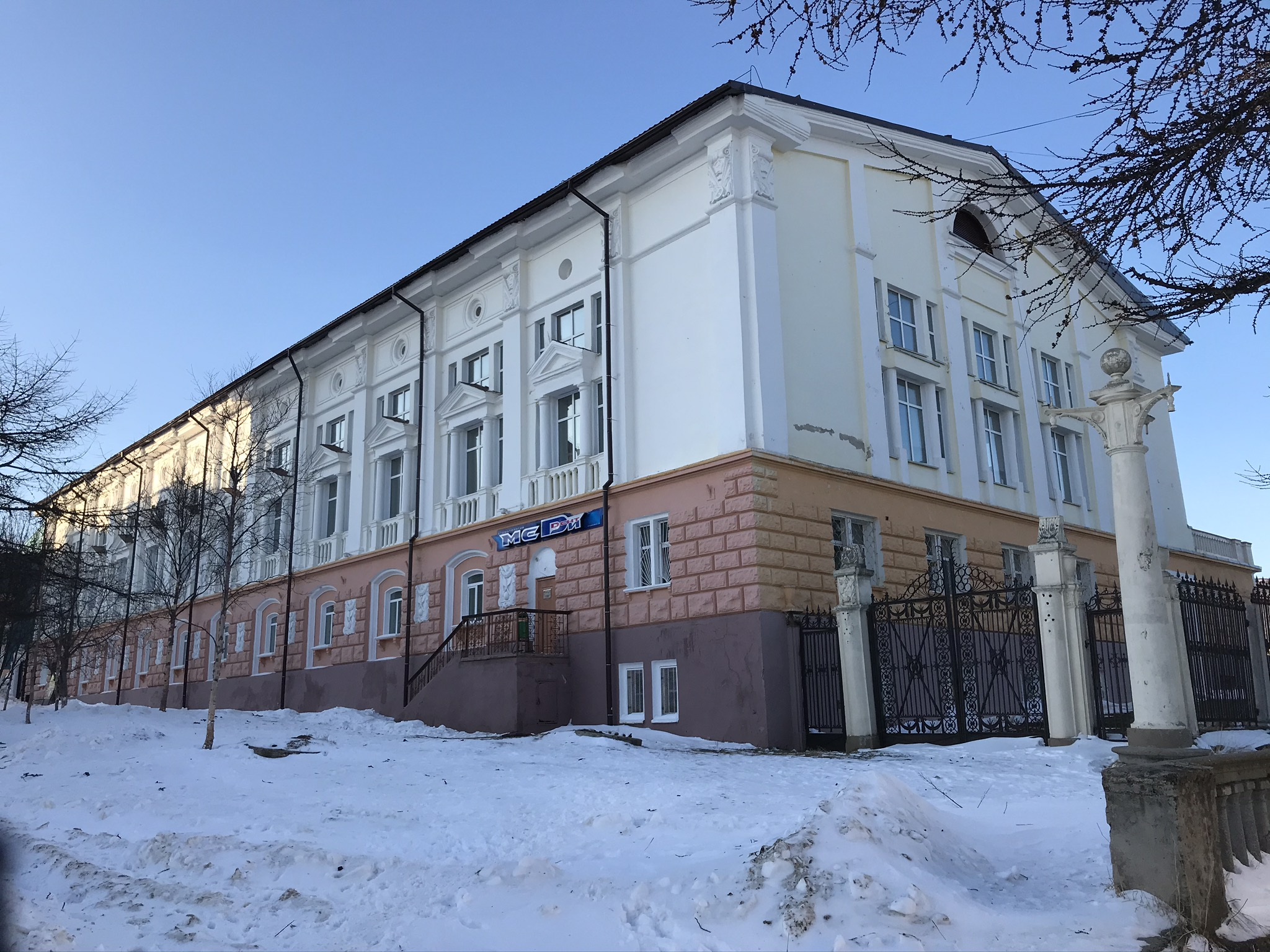
Magadan Palace of Sports

== Geography ==
The Magadanka River, a 192 km long river flowing to the Sea of Okhotsk, passes the city. The city is located on the isthmus of the Staritsky Peninsula by the Nagaev Bay.

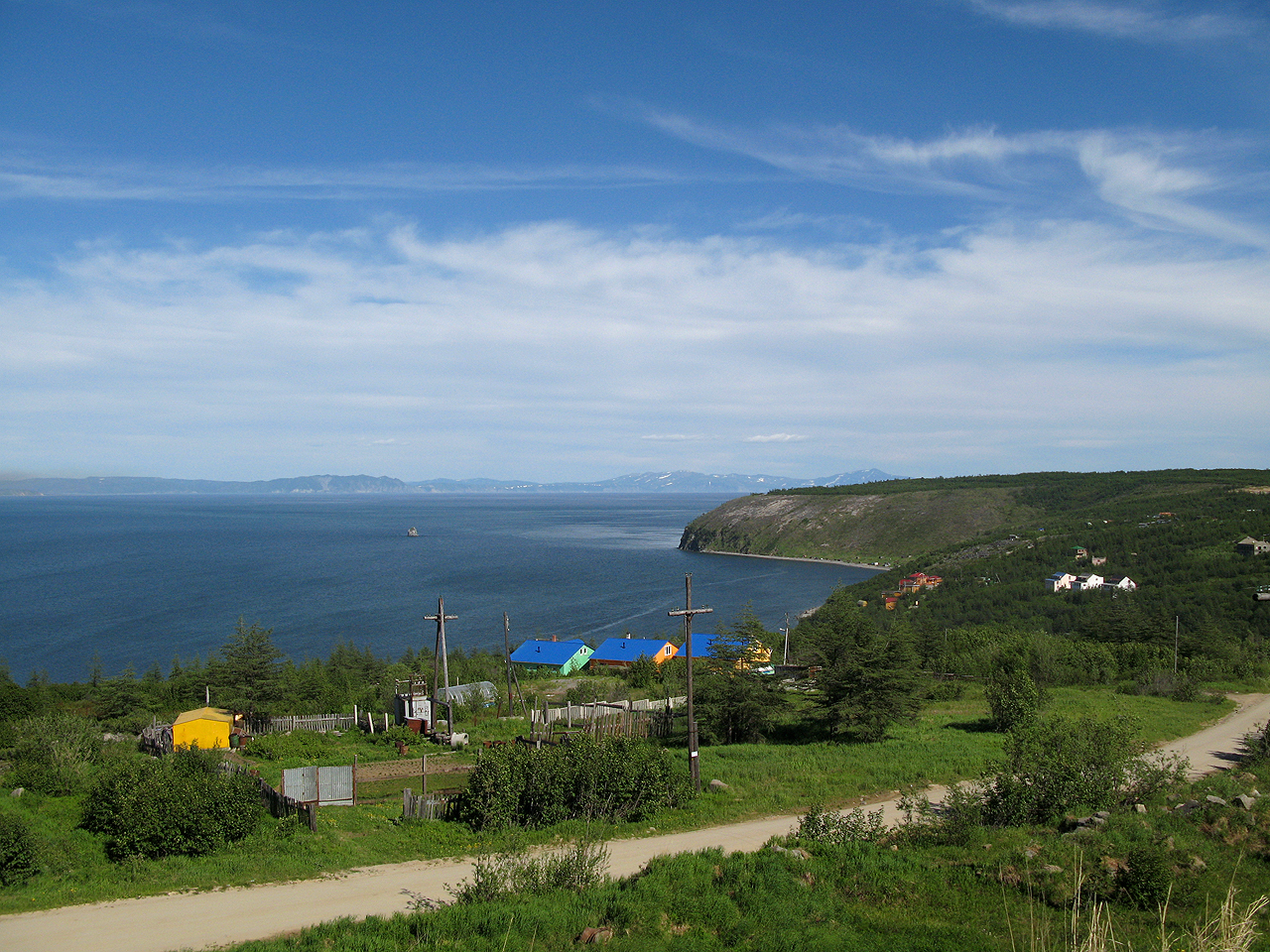
View of Gertner Bay, Cape Red and Kekurny Island

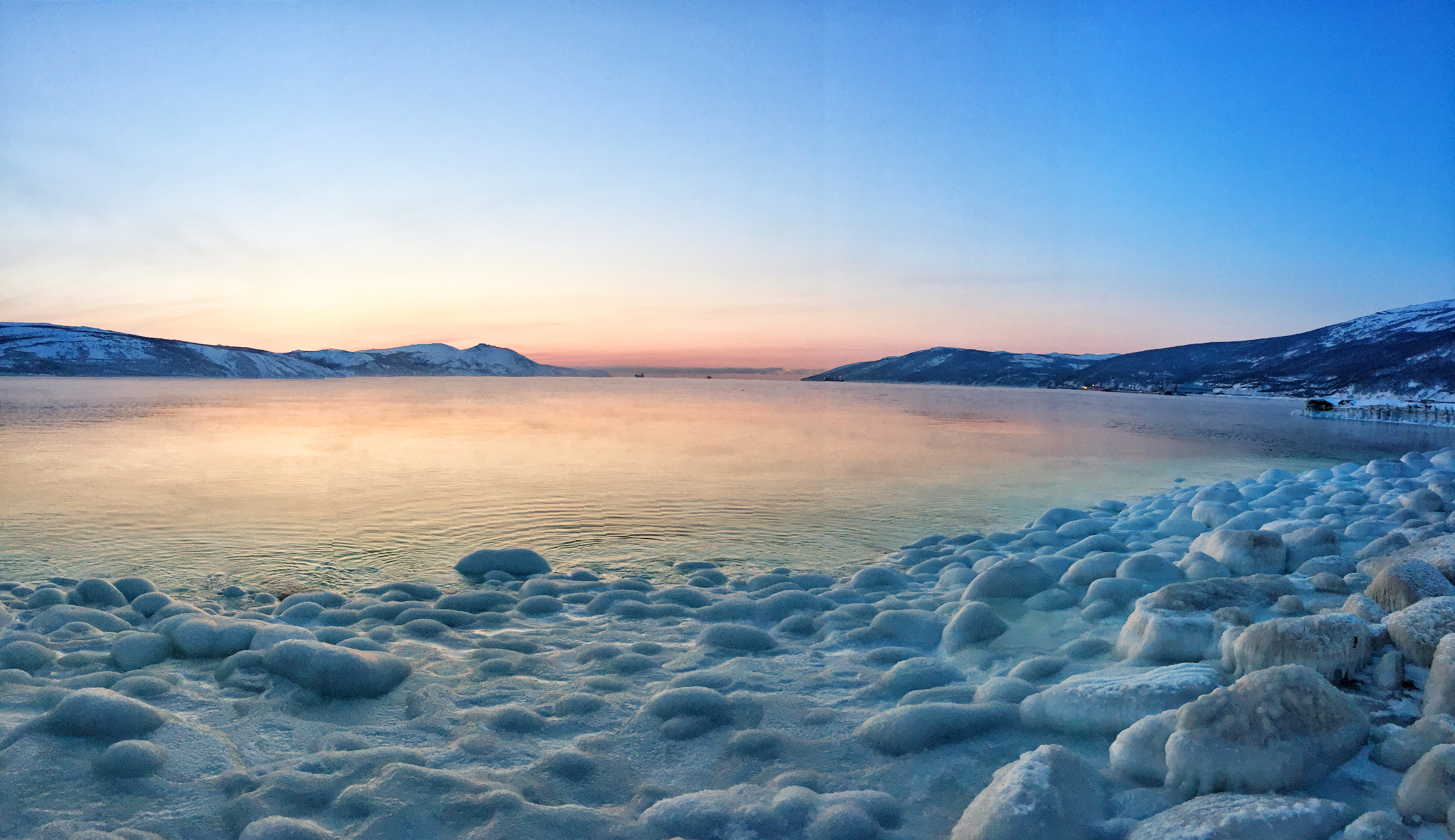
Nagaev Bay

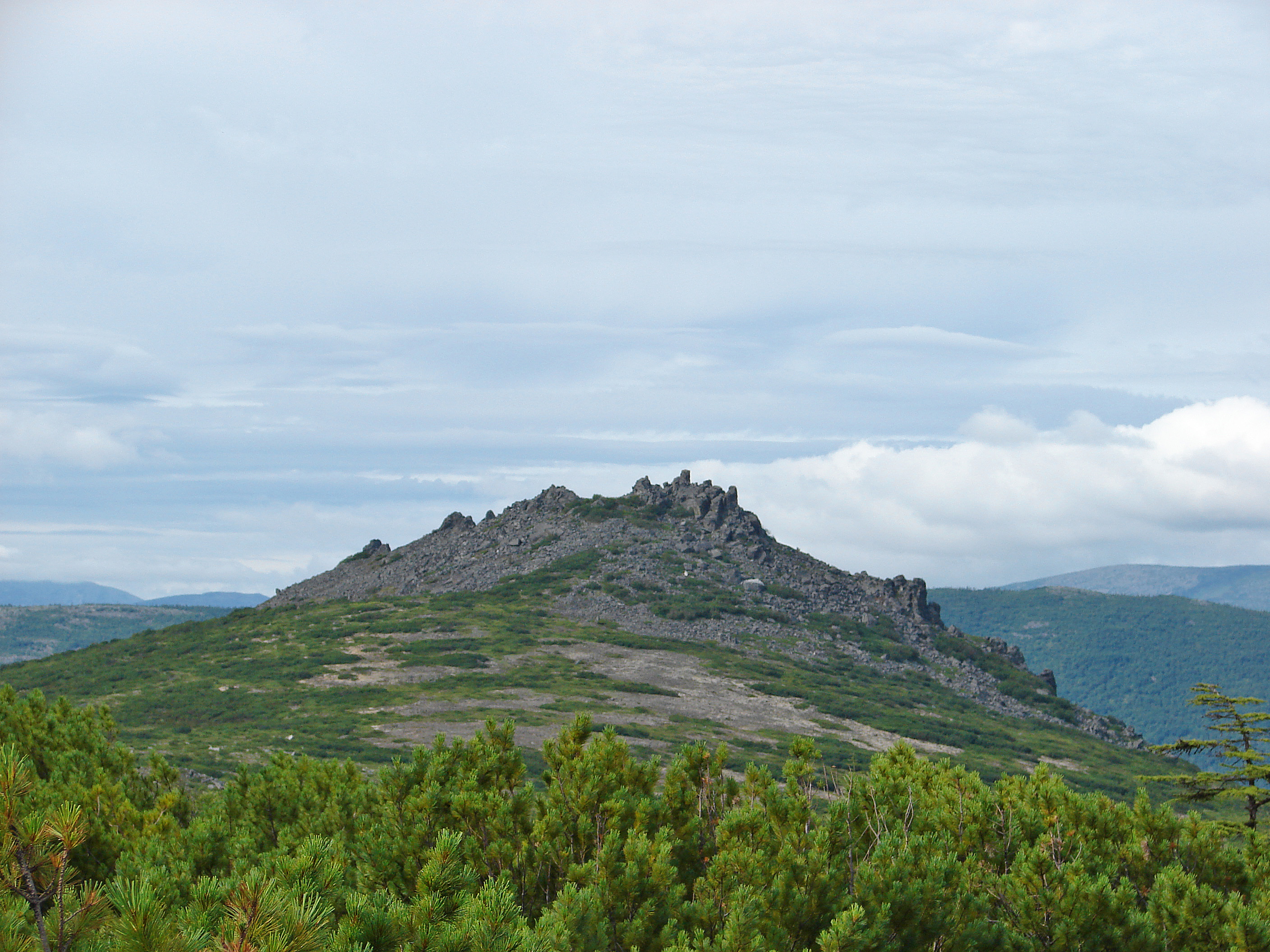
Kamenny venetz (Stone Crown)

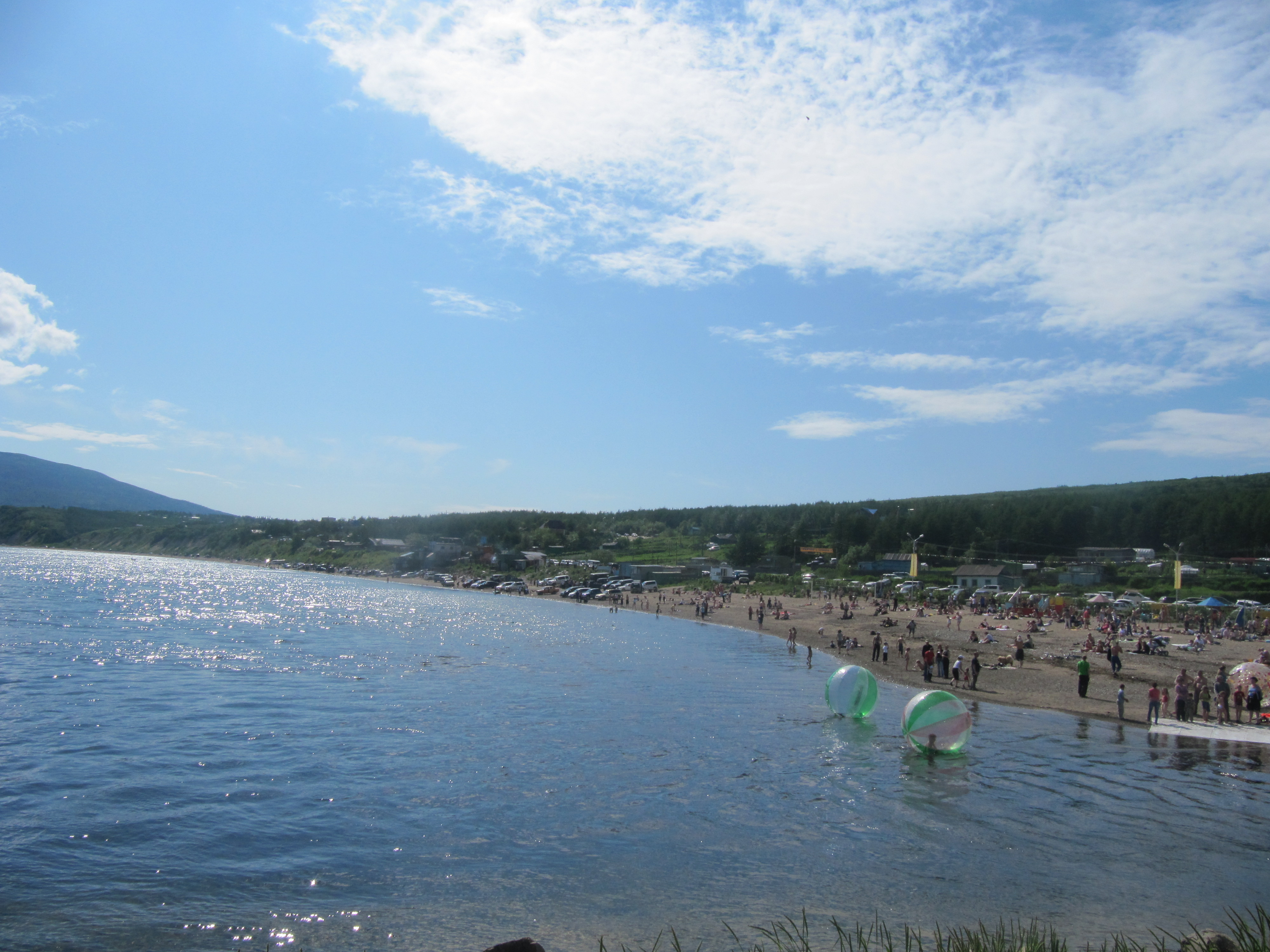
Magadan beach, July 2011

Ecologically situated in the Northeast Siberian taiga, the town's arboreal flora is made up of conifer trees, such as firs and larches, and silver birches. The city is surrounded by mountains to the west and northeast. Permafrost and tundra cover most of the region. The growing season is only one hundred days long.

The city of Magadan lies on approximately the same longitude as the suburbs of Greater Western Sydney, Australia, which are located near the eastern end of the 150th meridian east and close to the 151st meridian. It also lies on a similar latitude to southern Scandinavia and the far north of Scotland.

=== Climate ===
The climate of Magadan is subarctic (Köppen climate classification Dfc). Winters are prolonged and very cold, with up to six months of sub-zero high temperatures, so that the soil remains permanently frozen; although they are still much milder than those of interior eastern Siberia. Average temperatures on the coast of the Sea of Okhotsk range from −22 °C (−8 °F) in January to +12 °C (54 °F) in July. Average temperatures in the interior range from −38 °C (−36 °F) in January to +16 °C (61 °F) in July. Due to the wet nature of October and November, a snowpack is built up early, which then lasts throughout the winter even while the influence from the Siberian High lowers precipitation throughout those months.

- Highest temperature: 27.8 °C (82.0 °F) on July 15, 2021
- Lowest temperature: −37 °C (−35 °F) on December 20, 1995
- Warmest month: 14.1 °C (57.4 °F) in July, 2009
- Coldest month: −25.0 °C (−13.0 °F) in January, 1933
- Warmest year: −1.3 °C (29.7 °F) in 2017
- Coldest year: −5.0 °C (23.0 °F) in 1967
- Highest daily Precipitation: 108 millimetres (4.3 in) in July, 2014
- Wettest month: 306 millimetres (12.0 in) in July, 2014
- Wettest year: 1,004 millimetres (39.5 in) in 1950
- Driest year: 226 millimetres (8.9 in) in 1947

Climate data for Magadan (1991–2020, extremes 1930–present)
Month	Jan	Feb	Mar	Apr	May	Jun	Jul	Aug	Sep	Oct	Nov	Dec	Year
Record high °C (°F)	2.4 (36.3)	3.2 (37.8)	5.8 (42.4)	9.7 (49.5)	22.3 (72.1)	24.5 (76.1)	27.8 (82.0)	26.1 (79.0)	20.2 (68.4)	13.8 (56.8)	6.6 (43.9)	3.6 (38.5)	27.8 (82.0)
Mean daily maximum °C (°F)	−13.3 (8.1)	−12.5 (9.5)	−7.5 (18.5)	−1.1 (30.0)	5.4 (41.7)	11.5 (52.7)	15.1 (59.2)	15.1 (59.2)	10.8 (51.4)	2.1 (35.8)	−7.0 (19.4)	−12.3 (9.9)	0.5 (32.9)
Daily mean °C (°F)	−15.6 (3.9)	−15.4 (4.3)	−10.9 (12.4)	−4.1 (24.6)	2.2 (36.0)	8.0 (46.4)	12.1 (53.8)	12.2 (54.0)	7.8 (46.0)	−0.7 (30.7)	−9.5 (14.9)	−14.5 (5.9)	−2.4 (27.7)
Mean daily minimum °C (°F)	−17.8 (0.0)	−17.8 (0.0)	−13.9 (7.0)	−6.9 (19.6)	−0.2 (31.6)	5.5 (41.9)	9.9 (49.8)	9.9 (49.8)	5.3 (41.5)	−3.0 (26.6)	−11.7 (10.9)	−16.6 (2.1)	−4.8 (23.4)
Record low °C (°F)	−34.6 (−30.3)	−33.3 (−27.9)	−30.8 (−23.4)	−23.5 (−10.3)	−10.8 (12.6)	−3.0 (26.6)	2.0 (35.6)	−1.0 (30.2)	−6.3 (20.7)	−21.1 (−6.0)	−26.9 (−16.4)	−37 (−35)	−37 (−35)
Average precipitation mm (inches)	18 (0.7)	14 (0.6)	21 (0.8)	24 (0.9)	40 (1.6)	52 (2.0)	67 (2.6)	102 (4.0)	85 (3.3)	75 (3.0)	61 (2.4)	27 (1.1)	586 (23.1)
Average extreme snow depth cm (inches)	26 (10)	24 (9.4)	25 (9.8)	24 (9.4)	9 (3.5)	0 (0)	0 (0)	0 (0)	0 (0)	5 (2.0)	23 (9.1)	31 (12)	31 (12)
Average rainy days	0.1	0.3	0.3	2	11	17	21	20	19	10	2	0.1	103
Average snowy days	16	16	16	17	12	0	0	0	1	14	19	16	127
Average relative humidity (%)	65	64	65	71	78	82	86	83	78	69	66	64	73
Mean monthly sunshine hours	77.3	132.6	211.4	235.9	226.3	228.5	196.0	175.6	157.3	142.9	79.9	50.2	1,913.9
Source 1: Погода и Климат
Source 2: NOAA

== Education ==
- North-Eastern State University (СВГУ, formerly Northern International University)
- The University of Alaska Anchorage (UAA) offers a scholarship to full-time students from Magadan.

== Notable people ==
- Anton Belyaev (b. 1979), musician, lead singer of Therr Maitz
- Anya Garnis (b. 1982), professional dancer, raised in Magadan, but not born there.
- Nikolai Getman (1917–2004), artist
- Dimitry Ipatov (b. 1984), ski jumper
- Inna Korobkina (b. 1981), actress
- Vadim Kozin (1903–1994), tenor
- Nina Lugovskaya (1918–1993), artist
- Sasha Luss (b. 1992), fashion model
- Gena Marvin (b. 2000s), performance artist
- Viktor Rybakov (b. 1956), former European amateur boxing champion
- Pavel Vinogradov (b. 1953), cosmonaut
- Yelena Välbe (b. 1968), Olympic cross-country skier

== Twin towns and sister cities ==
Magadan is twinned with:

- Anchorage, United States (1991)
- Tonghua, Jilin, China (1992)
- Zlatitsa, Bulgaria (2012)
- Shuangyashan, China (2013)
- In 2022 Jelgava, Latvia (2006) suspended the cooperation agreements with Magadan due to the Russian invasion of Ukraine.
