= Nagaev Bay =

Bay of the Sea of Okhotsk

- Бухта Нагаева (Russian)
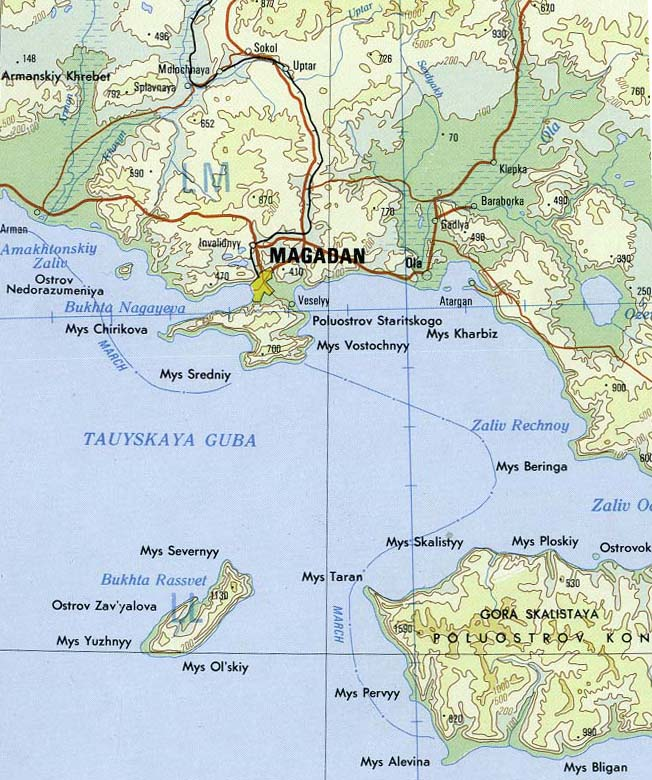
- Map showing Bukhta Nagayeva

- Location in Russia
- Location: Arctic
- Coordinates: 59.54°N 150.68°E
- Ocean/sea sources: Sea of Okhotsk
- Basin countries: Russia
- Max. length: 14.5 km (9.0 mi)
- Max. width: 6.4 km (4.0 mi)

Nagaev Bay or Nagayev Bay (Russian: Бухта Нагаева, Нагаевская бухта), also known as Nagayeva Bay, is a bay within Taui Bay in the northern part of the Sea of Okhotsk, Magadan Oblast, Russia.

== Geography ==
It is 6.4 km (4 mi) wide at its entrance and 14.5 km (9 mi) long. The city of Magadan with its port (formerly Nagaevo port) is located at the head of the bay on the isthmus of the Staritsky Peninsula. Ice occurs in the bay from the end of November to the middle of June. It was named after Russian hydrographer, admiral Alexey Nagaev. It has been described as the best mooring place in the Sea of Okhotsk.

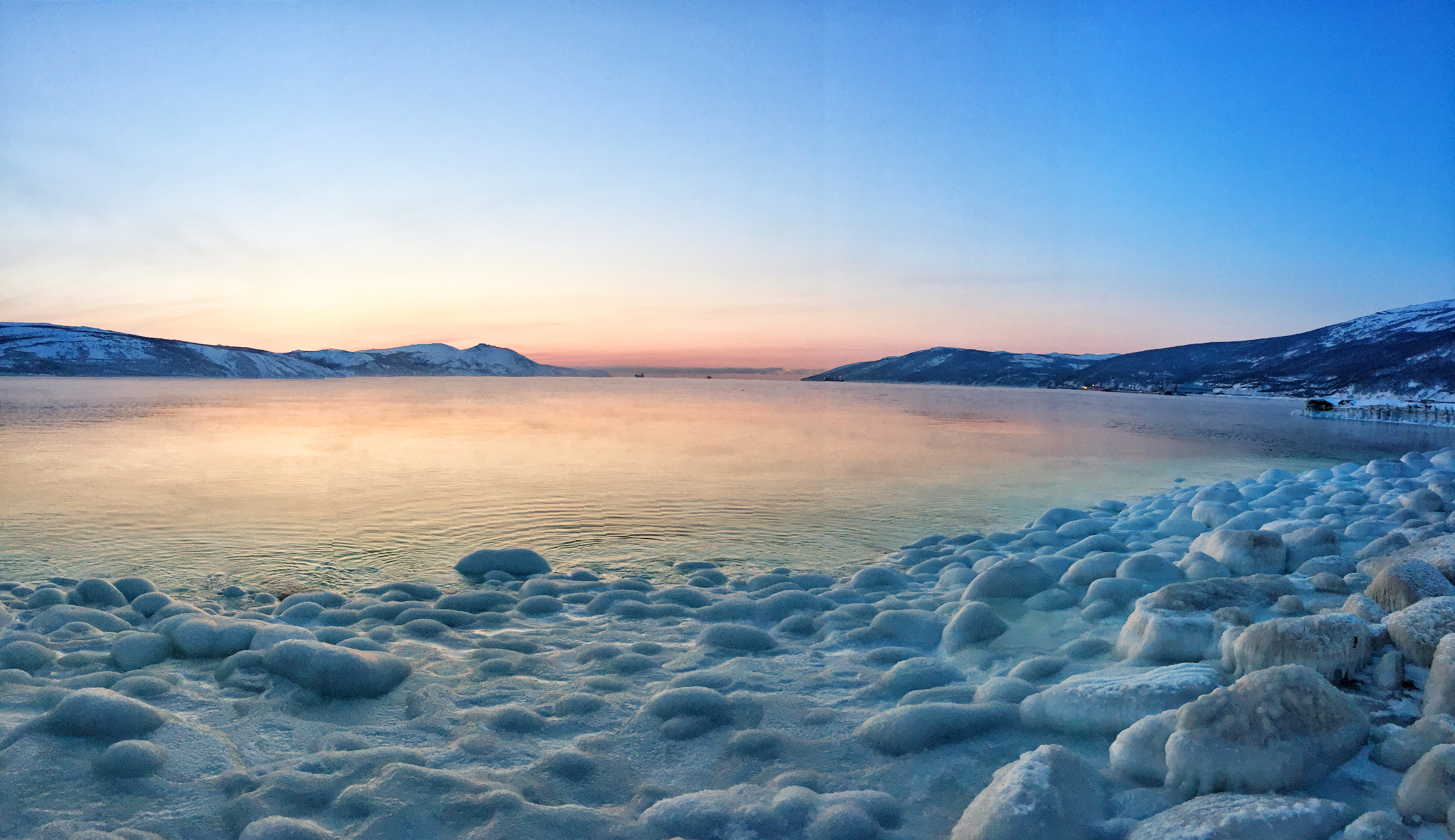
View of Nagaev Bay

== History ==
Between 1852 and 1869, American whaleships anchored in Nagayeva Bay to obtain wood and water and boil oil. They called it Jeannette Harbor, after the ship Jeannette (340 t (335 long tons; 375 short tons)), of New Bedford, which frequented Taui Bay in the early 1850s.

During the Gulag era, the bay was used as a transit point for Gulag inmates coming by sea and further directed to camps of Magadan and Kolyma to man the Dalstroy works. Since 1937 the headquarters of Sevvostlag were situated by Nagaev Bay.

== Cultural references ==
Varlam Shalamov mentioned the bay as part of the Gulag industry in his memoirs About Kolyma

Nagaev Bay is part of the refrain of Vladimir Vysotsky's song I Went to Magadan (Я уехал в Магадан)
