= Vladimir Nikolayevich Petrov =

Russian-American academic and philatelist

Vladimir Petrov
- Владимир Николаевич Петров
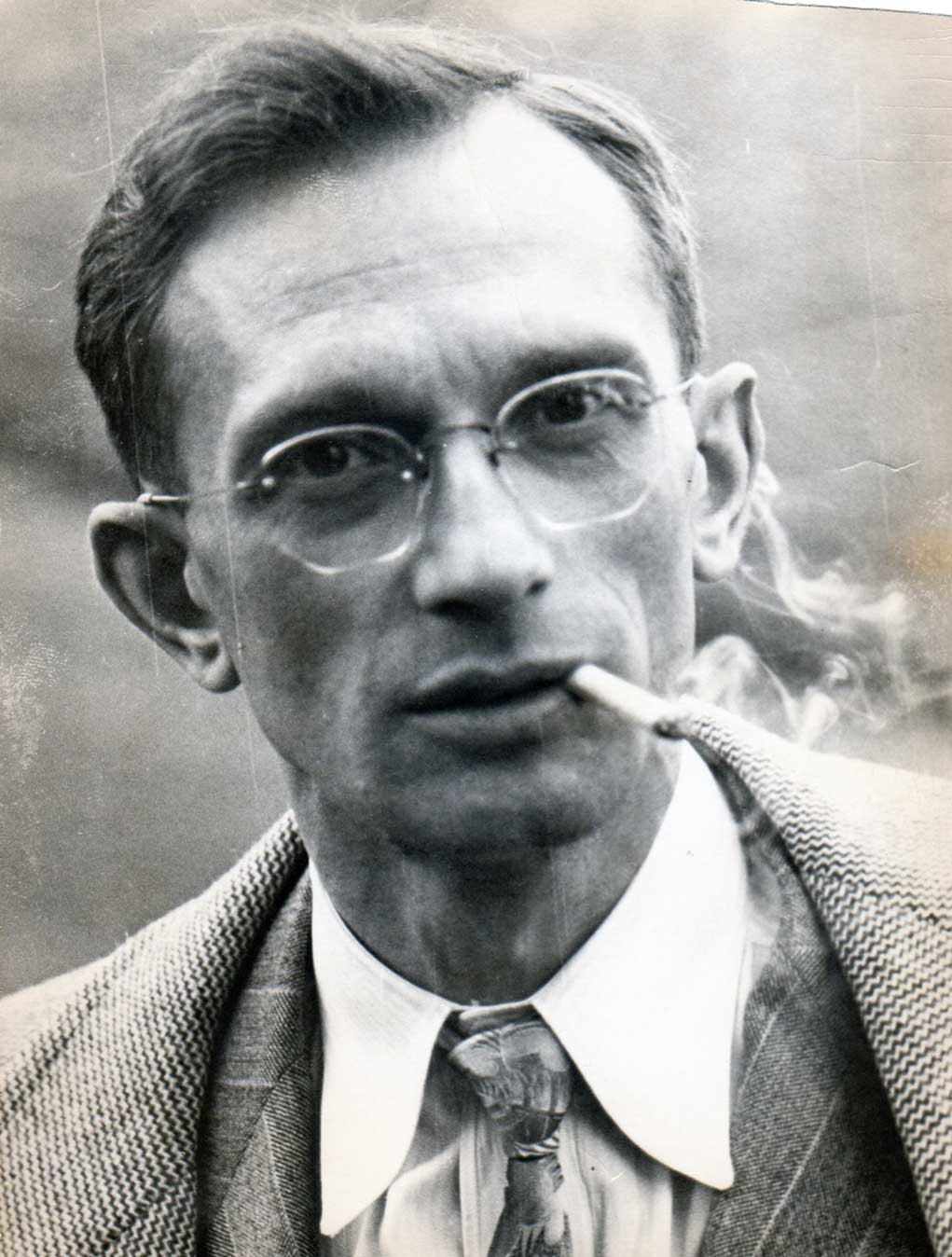
- Petrov in the early 1950s
- Born: Vladimir Nikolayevich Petrov; 1915; Ekaterinodar oblast, Russian Empire
- Died: March 17, 1999 (aged 83–84); Kensington, Maryland, US
- Citizenship: Russian Empire; Soviet Union; United States
- Occupations: Writer, political dissident, factory worker, academic
- Writing career
- Language: Russian
- Subject: Politics
- Notable work: Escape from the Future

Vladimir Nikolayevich Petrov (1915 in Ekaterinodar oblast, Russian Empire – March 17, 1999, in Kensington, Maryland) was at various times an academic, philatelist, prisoner, forced laborer, political prisoner, adventurer, factory worker, chess player and writer of short stories and autobiographies. He was at various times a Russian, American, and man of no country, though he was brought up in the USSR and died in the United States. Most of the information concerning his life originates from his personal memoirs, entitled Soviet Gold and My Retreat from Russia abridged in the published work Escape from the Future.

== Early life ==
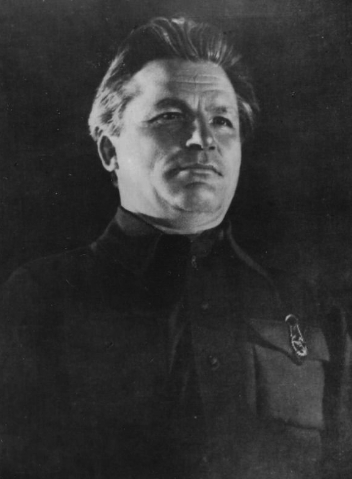
Sergey Kirov, whose assassination gave Stalin cause to launch the Great Purge

Petrov was born in Russia in 1915 during the last days of the Tsar. His parents were from the petit bourgeoisie, his mother a teacher in an experimental school, his father a free-thinker, banker and lay philosopher (follower of Ernest Renan, among others). His father was part of a group socially-minded associates who organized a farmer's credit union, thus enabling farmers to own their means of production during the early years of socialism. The success of the farmers' bank (in its heyday the farmers collectively owned several trucks and even a river steamship for transporting their produce directly to city markets) brought trouble from the Bolshevik authorities. Petrov's father was imprisoned for the first time when young Volodya was 7 years old, for allegedly exploiting the working classes. Upon his release, Petrov's father called him up to Moscow to continue his studies at a technical high school. Petrov was 14 and wished to study history, but his father's prison record excluded his son from this potentially political subject. Petrov later entered the department of civil engineering at the University of Leningrad, living in his words "the meager existence of a young student" where he was arrested on the night of February 17, 1935, by the NKVD. He was arrested at age 19 as part of the mass purges which followed in the wake of the assassination of Sergey Kirov. He was imprisoned and tortured for months before being formally charged with a crime.

Petrov's namesake son summarizes the reason for his father's arrest as "for coming to the defense of a rape victim."

The crimes he was charged with were, as related in his autobiography:

1. Writing of anti-soviet character (my diaries).
2. Possession of counter-revolutionary literature (the diaries...)
3. Espionage (correspondence with philatelists in the United States of America and Yugoslavia)
4. Anti-Soviet propaganda abroad (ditto).
5. Fomenting an armed uprising among the Cossacks...
6. Preparations for robbing savings banks and co-operatives...
7. Organization of counter-revolutionary group among the student of my institute...
8. Anti-Soviet propaganda among the population

An NKVD Troika convicted him of charges 1, 5, and 7 as given above. The only evidence presented was a personal diary he had written when he was 16. Without being able to consult counsel or view the evidence against him, he was sentenced to six years hard labor in the gold fields of the Kolyma. Due to their association with him, multiple of his colleagues were arrested on similar charges of counter-revolutionary activity.

He was sentenced under Article 58, Paragraphs 10 and 14 of the Soviet legal code. This made him a "contra" or "counter-revolutionary political prisoner," a resident of the Gulag archipelago.

== Prison term ==
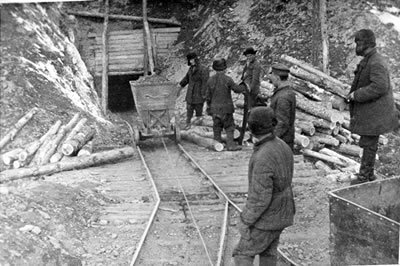
Forced labor at a GULAG/Dalstroy goldmine, such as Petrov performed

During his internment, Petrov's life was one of complex vacillations. He at times had more freedom than many prisoners, including freedom of movement, sufficient food, medical care, private housing, and female companionship. At times he was one of the worst-treated of all prisoners in the GULAG system, living on a bread ration of less than half a kilogram per day and working near-naked in sub-zero waters to mine gold for the NKVD. He constantly lived in hope of having his sentence commuted, and constantly lived in fear of Serpantinnaya, a 'truck stop' north of Magadan which Petrov charges was used by the NKVD to perform summary executions.

He attempted escape numerous times, some of which attempts were only routed based upon lack of provisions and protective clothing to combat the Russian Winter. He traded in camp vodka and performed electrical repairs for fees and favors. He liaised with the wives of camp leaders. He became exposed to political dissidence, meeting Trotskyites, anarchists, as well as doctrinaire Bolsheviks and informants for the Cheka. During his term he also discovered the largest ever gold nugget in the history of the Kolyma gold fields. He was severely wounded by ammonal explosions in a mine, he was often beaten by guards and interrogators, and many times he existed on starvation rations for extended periods of time.

Petrov's earthy wit, chess skills and relative youth were keys to his survival of Kolyma. He became friends with many people during his prison term. Among them was a red-haired man known as Prostoserdov, a Menshevik and vocal opponent of Stalinism. It is assumed that Prostoserdov's execution would have made him a martyr; as a result, he was among the most elect prisoners in terms of treatment and privileges. Petrov's run-ins with Prostoserdov serve as one of the work's most poignant refrain; each encounter shows how each man has changed, and how they have struggled to remain themselves.

Once, by his own admission, he murdered a cruel camp official in cold blood using a pickaxe. On many other occasions he conspired with fellow prisoners or in other ways violated the rules of Dalstroy. Sometimes he was placed on a lower bread ration, but rarely as a direct result of his actual transgressions. He was never severely punished, nor was his prison term lengthened. He at times went on hunger strikes to protest camp conditions, though he like other prisoners, was chronically mal-nourished and afflicted by scurvy.

It has been claimed that much of his account bears similarities to the later semi-fictional account of Aleksandr Solzhenitsyn in One Day in the Life of Ivan Denisovich. It has also been compared to Papillon by Henri Charrière. It is possible that Petrov's internment overlapped with that of Varlam Shalamov, the Russian writer, whose Kolyma Tales depict the brutality of human nature laid bare in this remote camp of the archipelago.

== After prison ==
Released from prison in the week that Nazi Germany invaded the USSR in World War II, Petrov made his way across Russia on the Trans-Siberian Railroad. He avoided Soviet mobilization; as an ex-convict he would have been placed in a mine-clearing battalion. The German front established by Operation Barbarossa passed by his town and thus came under control of the Third Reich. He managed, over two years, to work his way across Eastern Europe, into Germany and then Italy. In Nazi Germany, he contacted and briefly played a minor role in the civilian anti-stalinist operations of General Andrey Vlasov, then traveled to Italy where he energetically sought ways to leave war-torn Europe.

== After the war ==
In 1947 he secured passage to the United States through the good offices of the Tolstoy Foundation, an organization that helped numerous Russians reach the US. After a stint as a factory-worker, he became an academic and taught, first as a lecturer at Yale University, then as tenured professor in the Institute for Sino-Soviet Studies at the George Washington University. In 1955 and 1956 Petrov worked at Radio Liberty in Munich. Prof. Petrov's academic works included the books 'Money and Conquest', 'A Study in Diplomacy', 'What China Policy?', 'June 22, 1941' and numerous academic monographs. His later work in Sino-Soviet affairs led him to study the controversial relationship between Joseph Stalin and Mao Zedong, and to openly question American foreign policy regarding what he considered to be an absurd non-recognition of mainland China. True to his early passion for history, he was averse to all forms of politically inspired re-writing of history. His academic approach could be described as journalistic, as he much preferred primary sources such as eyewitness interviews and documents to second-hand accounts.

In the 1950s Petrov participated in anti-Communist emigre politics and was a regular contributor to the New York newspaper Novoye Russkoye Slovo, under a pseudonym. His connections included people as diverse as Alexander Kerensky and Max Eastman. In 1947, he and Henry A. Wallace met, and Wallace publicly apologized for having misrepresented reality when he had visited Magadan in 1944. During the McCarthy trials Petrov was called upon to describe the conditions in the Soviet concentration camps. Petrov published the first volume of his memoirs, Soviet Gold, in 1949, and My Retreat from Russia in 1950. Soviet Gold was the first published memoir of a Gulag prisoner in the West, and received a favorable review from Winston Churchill. In the early 1950s Petrov was published by William I Nichols, editor of the then-popular This Week syndicated magazine. Nichols published excerpts of Petrov's memoirs and encouraged the publication of his humorous short stories, fondly calling Petrov "a poor-man's Tchekov".

Vladimir Petrov died March 17, 1999, at age 83 at his home in Kensington, Maryland, after a brief illness. He was survived by his wife, Jean MacNab, nine children—George, Susanna, Elizabeth, Vladimir, Alexander, Jane, Anne, Andrew and Carol—and seven grandchildren, many of whom work in science, technology, medicine, and the arts. "Live for today, never mind tomorrow", was one of his favorite sayings.

== See also ==
- Gulag
- Dalstroy
- Great Purge
- Moscow Trials
- Andrey Vlasov

== Sources ==
- Petrov, Vladimir (1949). Soviet Gold, Farrar Straus, New York.
- Petrov, Vladimir (1950). My Retreat from Russia, Yale University Press, New Haven
- Petrov, Vladimir (1973). Escape from the Future: The Incredible Adventures of a Young Russian, Indiana University Press, Bloomington, ISBN 025320190X.
- Petrov, Vladimir (1967). Money and Conquest Johns Hopkins Press, Baltimore
- Petrov, Vladimir (1968). June 22 1941 - Soviet Historians and the German Invasion University of South Carolina Press, Columbia
- Petrov, Vladimir (1971). A Study in Diplomacy - The Story of Arthur Bliss Lane Henry Regnery Company, Chicago
- Petrov, Vladimir, Editor (1975). Soviet-Chinese Relations 1945-1970 Indiana University Press, Bloomington

New York Times Obituary https://www.nytimes.com/1999/03/28/world/vladimir-petrov-is-dead-at-83-soviet-prisoner.html?searchResultPosition=2
