= Vladimir Vinnichevsky =

Soviet teenaged serial killer

- Born: Vladimir Georgievich Vinnichevsky; 8 June 1923; Verkhnyaya Salda, Sverdlovsk Oblast, RSFSR
- Died: 11 November 1940 (aged 17); Sverdlovsk Oblast, RSFSR
- Cause of death: Execution by shooting
- Other name: "The Urals Monster"
- Status: Executed
- Conviction: Murder
- Penalty: Death

Details
- Victims: 8
- Span of crimes: 1938–1939
- Country: Soviet Union
- State: Sverdlovsk
- Date apprehended: 24 October 1939

Vladimir Georgievich Vinnichevsky (Russian: Влади́мир Гео́ргиевич Винниче́вский; 8 June 1923 – 11 November 1940), known as The Urals Monster (Russian: Уральское чудовище), was the youngest known Soviet serial killer.

He was convicted of eighteen attacks on children aged between two and four years in 1938–1939 in Sverdlovsk, Nizhny Tagil and Kushva. Eight of these attacks resulted in murder.

On 16 January 1940, Vinnichevsky was sentenced to death and executed several months later.

== Early years ==
Vladimir Vinnichevsky was born in July 1923. His father, Georgy Ivanovich, worked as a crew chief in municipal public utilities of Sverdlovsk, and his mother, Elizaveta Petrovna, was an accountant. The family lived in a stand-alone private house in the centre of Sverdlovsk. The Vinnichevsky family was considered wealthy by Soviet standards at the time: Vladimir had a suit, a tank helmet, a Swiss knife, and leather shoes. He had been also given pocket money - at the time of his arrest, he was found to have more than 20 rubles, which constituted the two-day salary of an average Soviet worker at the time. Vinnichevsky studied at the Sverdlovsk School No. 16, in the 7 "B" grade. Due to his low performance in school, he once had to repeat a grade. At the same time, however, he was good at singing and knew many songs by heart.

Vinnichevsky was on friendly terms with Ernst Neizvestny, who later became a famous sculptor. Neizvestny and Vinnichevsky were in the same year of schooling (Vinnichevsky was two years older than Neizvestny, but went to school at a one-year older age and repeated a grade). The adolescents lived near each other. Together they attended school, cinema and Sverdlovsk's Theater of Musical Comedy. Vinnichevsky often visited Neizvestny's apartment. During an interrogation on 17 November 1939, Ernst Neizvestny described Vinnichevsky with the following words:

I can say that he was a very humble boy, shy, loved to be alone, often in school he would be somewhere in a corner or standing by the wall. Being with him, I talked about girls, and he always spoke about them with some disgust and said that he would not like to have sexual intercourse and never had... I personally often noticed for him that he, went to the restroom and stayed there for a very long time, what he did there, I do not know.

== Murders ==
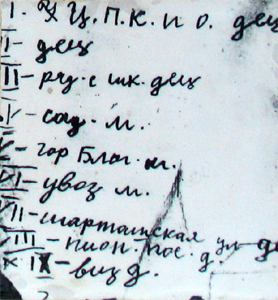
The list of victims with encrypting information, which lead to Vinnichevsky

It is not known when Vinnichevsky committed his first murder, since the investigators could not find the relatives of the first victims, about whom Vinnichevsky gave evidence. To commit his crimes, Vinnichevsky would go around yards, saying that he was under the orders of the Komsomol organization for the sponsored Pioneer squads collecting scrap metal. He therefore went around neighbourhoods, figuring out which residents had scrap.

The first murder (or more precisely, the third, as there is no information on the previous murders) was that of 4-year-old Gerta Grebanova, committed in the summer or early autumn of 1938 in Sverdlovsk. Vinnichevsky entered the courtyard of the private house where the Gribanovs lived, took the girl to the kitchen garden, where he strangled her, and then struck her head 8 times with a kitchen knife, breaking it, and leaving a splinter in the victim's skull. He later disposed of the broken knife and used a screwdriver and a folding knife in later murders.

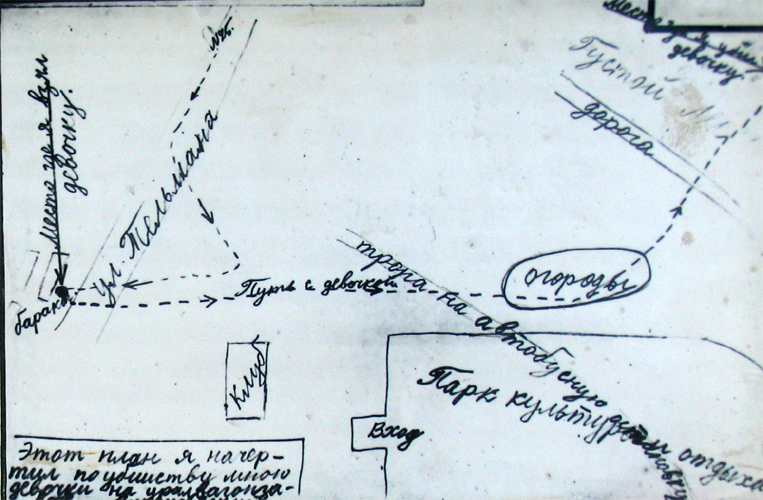
The planned map for the abduction and murder of a girl named Rita Fomina in Nizhny Tagil (case materials)

Although Vinnichevsky committed most of the attacks in Sverdlovsk, he made trips to other cities in the Sverdlovsk Oblast to confuse the investigation - one attack was committed in Nizhny Tagil, and another in Kushva. He attacked both boys and girls. The motive of the attack was a sexual act with the victim. At first, Vinnichevsky tried to perform a "natural" sexual act with the female victims, but he was convinced that, due to anatomical limitations, this could not be done. Then he began to perform anal intercourse, and in some cases (usually in the cold season) limited himself to rubbing his genitals. After the act Vinnichevsky would choke his victim, and sometimes stab them to death.

The murder of Gerta Gribanova gave the investigators evidence, as the girl's skull had a knife piece stuck in it. The girl's body was beheaded by the investigative authorities: the skull was left as evidence, and the rest was given to the child's parents for burial. The assumption was that the killer would use the same kitchen knife that ended Gribanova's life, but later, this assumption turned out to be false.

The fifth victim of Vinnichevsky was a boy who, most likely, survived, but could not be found. Then the killer suggested to 4-year-old Borya Titov to go sledging with him, took him to a wasteland, and attacked him after a snowdrift. Although Vinnichevsky prudently took the child with him, the child was rescued, and later told the investigators about the murderer.

The seventh victim was 3-year-old Kate Lobanova in Kushva. The girl was killed, and her body was later thrown into a swamp to hide the smell of decomposition.

In Sverdlovsk, Vinnichevsky began to practice the kidnapping of children and killing them in the forest massifs to the outskirts, where the bodies were covered with branches. This is how 4-year-old Lida Surina and 3-year-old Valya Kamaeva died in the spring of 1939. Later, 3-year-old Alya Gubina was kidnapped, whom Vinnichevsky raped, after which he stabbed her several times with a knife, leaving a wound 25 cm (9.8 in) long. After that, he threw the girl away, but she survived and quickly fled. At the same time, Vinnichevsky did not take the child further than 1 km (0.62 mi) away from the place where he picked her up. He killed not only in the outskirts but also near his home on Mamin-Sibiryak Street, where he kidnapped two children.

The last victim - 4-year-old Taisia Morozov - after killing her, Vinnichevsky threw her body into a cesspool, placing her clothes into the front garden of the apartment building, hoping that it was there that they would search for the child's remains.

The wounded victims from Vinnichevsky's attacks who were thrown into cesspools had practically no chance to escape, even if they were still alive. However, 4-year-old Raya Rahmatulina, thrown by Vinnichevsky into a cesspool, woke up and began to scream, alerting passers-by who rescued her.

== Arrest ==
The Sverdlovsk criminal investigation department found it difficult to investigate cases of abductions of children. The kidnappings were very different - from the different locations to the different disposal of the bodies. In addition, the surviving children could not give a clear description of the kidnapper. Finally, the parents of some of the victims did not file a complaint to the police. At the same time, the investigators made several erroneous assumptions about the murderer's identity. Everyone was sure that the killer had been convicted earlier, and, it was supposed, for crimes against the sexual inviolability of the person. It was assumed that the murderer was between 20 and 25, and looked like a teenager. According to one theory, the killer was either mentally ill or simply a degenerate. Only in the summer of 1939 were all known cases connected into one; however, the attacks in Nizhny Tagil and Kushva were not connected with the Sverdlovsk murders. In 1939, Sverdlovsk was flooded with hidden police patrols, with more than 300 people arrested.

On 24 October 1939, during the commission of the crimes, Vinnichevsky was detained by three police high school cadets named Popov, Angelov and Krylov. While patrolling at the tram stop in Verkhnyaya Pyshma, the cadets noticed a tall man who was carrying a little boy into the forest. Vinnichevsky had kidnapped the 3-year-old Vycheslav Volkov, whom his mother left for a few minutes at the entrance of the family home. The killer snatched the boy quickly and got into the tram to get away from his pursuers. The cadets followed the teenager and found him at a time when Vinnichevsky was choking the boy. Vyacheslav was rescued, and Vinnichevsky was detained.

As Vycheslav's scarf covered his neck, Vinnichevsky had to unbutton his shirt and begin strangling Vycheslav, leaving well-visible scrapes of skin on his fingernails. This deprived Vinnichevsky of the opportunity to come up with an exculpatory version of his actions such as: "I wanted to fix the boy's scarf" or "loosen the button on his shirt collar".

== Trial, sentence and execution ==
During the investigation, Vinnichevsky confessed to the murders, revealing that he had recorded all the murders on paper, encrypting the text.

Vinnichevsky's parents brought this statement to the regional newspaper titled "The Ural Worker":

We, the parents, renounce such a son and demand a supreme measure be applied to him - shooting. Such bastards cannot be alive in the Soviet family.

Original in Russian: <<Мы, родители, отрекаемся от такого сына и требуем применить к нему высшую меру — расстрел. Таким выродкам в советской семье жизни быть не может.>>

November 1, 1939 12 o'clock in the afternoon

The doctor of jurisprudence AS Skryalin emphasizes that the trial of Vinnichevsky was held when Soviet legislation provided for the death penalty for minors who had reached the age of 12 years. The People's Commissar for Defense, Kliment Voroshilov, on 19 March 1935, sent Stalin, Molotov and Kalinin a letter with a proposal to introduce the death penalty for children, pointing to the statistics of child crime in Moscow and, in particular, on wounding a son of the deputy prosecutor of the Soviet capital by a 9-year-old boy. Voroshilov was well acquainted with Stalin since the battle of Tsaritsyn. The letter quickly gave the result in the form of a normative legal act. On 8 April 1935, a joint resolution of the CEC and the Council of People's Commissars of the USSR "on measures to combat juvenile delinquency" was promulgated, providing for the imposition of the death penalty from the age of 12. This was known abroad. The famous writer Romain Rolland, in a conversation with Stalin on 28 June 1935, questioned the humanity of such a measure. Stalin replied to him:

This decree has a purely pedagogical significance. We wanted to frighten them not so much hooliganous children as organizers of hooliganism among children ... The decree was issued in order to frighten and disorganize adult bandits and protect our children from hooligans... And could we give an explanation in the sense that this decree we published in pedagogical goals, to prevent crimes, to intimidate criminal elements? Of course, could not, because in this case the law would lose all power in the eyes of criminals.

On 20 April 1935, the top-secret circular of the USSR Prosecutor's Office and the USSR Supreme Court No. 1/001537-30/002517, which was signed by the USSR Prosecutor Andrei Vyshinsky and the Chairman of the Supreme Court of the USSR Vinokurov, is dated. The Circular explained to Prosecutor's Offices and Courts the Resolution "On measures to combat crime among minors":

... it is necessary to consider the indication in the footnote to Art. 13 of the "Basic Principles of the Criminal Legislation of the USSR and the Union Republics" and the relevant articles of the Criminal Codes of the Union Republics (Article 22 of the Criminal Code of the RSFSR and the corresponding articles of the Criminal Code of other Union republics), according to which the execution to persons under the age of 18 years is not applied.

Thus, the USSR prosecutor's office and the Supreme Court of the USSR virtually abolished article 22 of the Criminal Code, which explicitly abolished the execution against persons under the age of 18. On 2 January 1936, the Resolution of the Plenum of the Supreme Court of the USSR indicated that if persons who have attained the age of 12 commit crimes not listed in Article 12, but connected with violence, bodily harm, mutilation or murder, they are liable under the relevant article of the Criminal Code.

Secret circular No. 1/001537 - 30/002517 also prescribed (under the proposal) prosecuting authorities and the courts to inform the prosecutor of the USSR and Chairman of the Supreme Court of the USSR "on all cases of criminal trial of juvenile offenders in respect of which it is possible the use of the death penalty".

On 16 January 1940, Vinnichevsky was sentenced to death by the Soviet court. The convict filed a request for a pardon, in which he claimed that he was ready to win forgiveness in battle, and expressed the desire to become a tanker, since at the time the USSR was at war with Finland. His clemency was denied, and he was executed.

== Place of burial ==
In the USSR, bodies of those executed were not given to relatives for burial, but were buried in special secret places. Vinnichevsky was probably buried at 12 km of the Moscow tract. This is the only known burial place in the Sverdlovsk region, where the bodies of the executed were buried in the 1930s. These bodies were not divided for what they were shot for; therefore, all were buried in one mass grave, both those executed for political reasons and on criminal charges, such as Vinnichevsky. In the 1990s, the burial place was turned into a memorial complex of victims of reprisals of the 1920s–1950s. On 20 November 2017, at this complex a monument titled "Masks of Sorrow: Europe-Asia" was opened, the work of a friend of Vinnichevsky, Ernst Neizvestny.

== Vinnichevsky's case files ==
Vinnichevsky's criminal case is No. 434. According to the State Archives of the Sverdlovsk Region, the archive contains four volumes of the criminal case against Vladimir Georgievich Vinnichevsky, considered by the Sverdlovsk Regional Court in 1940. They are in the fund of the State Archives of the Sverdlovsk Region R-148 "Sverdlovsk Regional Court" (Inventory 2). In one media in the summer of 2017, information appeared that the materials of the criminal case of Vinnichevsky had been kept secret for more than 70 years. However, according to the answer of the State Archives of the Sverdlovsk Region on 16 March 2018, the Vinnichevsky case was archived in 1991, and since then has been freely available.

== See also ==
- List of Russian serial killers

== Literature ==
- A. Rakitin: Socialism does not breed crime. Serial crime in the USSR: historical and forensical analysis - Ekaterinburg, M.: The Cabinet Scientist, 2016 - 528 p., ISBN 978-5-7525-3028-9.
- A. Rakitin: The Urals Monster. The chronicle of the exposure of the most mysterious serial killer of the Soviet Union. Book I - Without space: Ridero, 2018 - 428 p. - ISBN 978-5-4490-2254-7.
- A. Rakitin: The Urals Monster. The chronicle of the exposure of the most mysterious serial killer of the Soviet Union. Book II - Without space: Ridero, 2018. - 442 p. - ISBN 978-5-4490-2254-7.
