= Ernst Neizvestny =

Russian sculptor (1925–2016)

- Эрнст Неизвестный
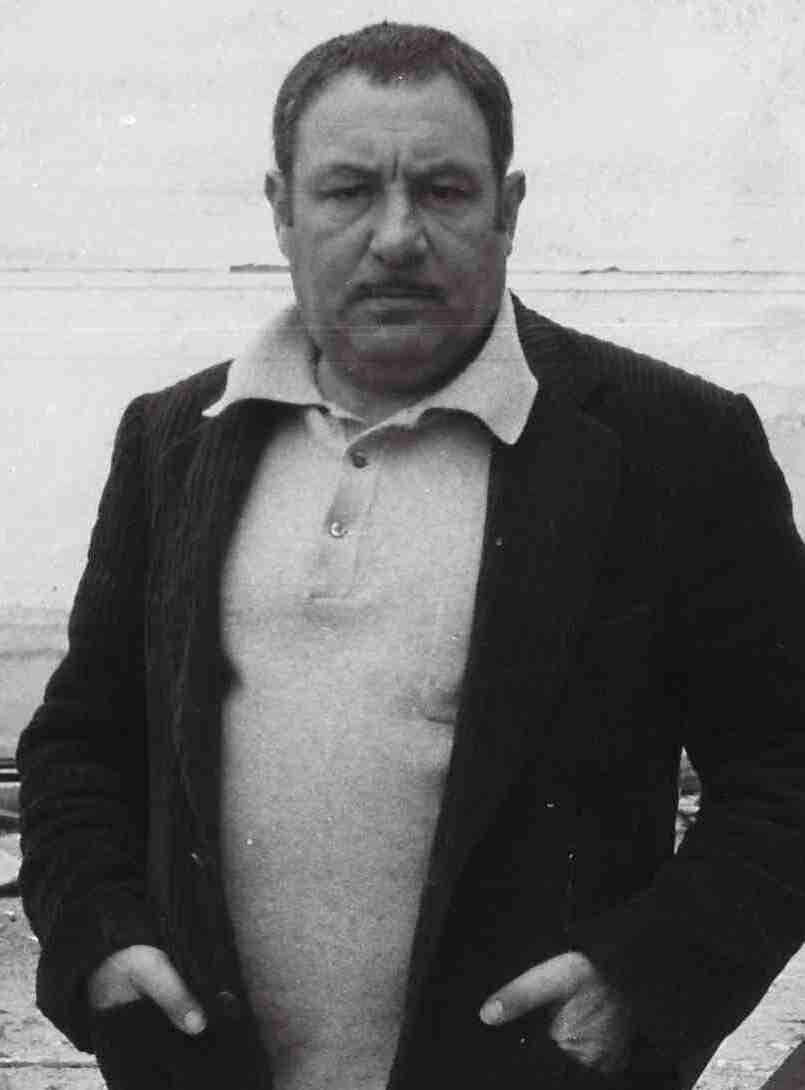
- Neizvestny in 1975
- Born: Erik Iosifovich Neizvestny; 9 April 1925; Sverdlovsk, Russian SFSR, Soviet Union
- Died: 9 August 2016 (aged 91); Stony Brook, New York, U.S.
- Education: Art Academy of Latvia, Surikov Moscow Art Institute, Moscow State University
- Occupations: Sculptor; painter; graphic artist; art philosopher
- Notable work: Mask of Sorrow
- Style: Large monumental sculptures
- Movement: Expressionism
- Awards: State Prize of the Russian Federation (1996)
- Elected: The Russian Academy of Arts (2004)

Ernst Iosifovich Neizvestny (born Erik Iosifovich Neizvestny, Russian: Эрнст Иосифович Неизвестный; 9 April 1925 – 9 August 2016) was a Russian sculptor, painter, graphic artist, and art philosopher. He emigrated to the United States in 1976 and lived and worked in New York City.

American playwright Arthur Miller once described Neizvestny as an "artist of the East" who is regarded by Russians as an "expression of the country, of its soul, language, and spirit" and as a "prophet of the future" who represents the "philosophical conscience of his country."

Alexander Calder, the American artist, once said to Neizvestny, "All my life I create the world of children, and you create the world of man."

== Early life ==
Erik Neizvestny was born 9 April 1925 in Sverdlovsk (now Yekaterinburg) into a Jewish family. His father was a doctor and his mother was a scientist. Ernst's great grandfather received his surname, literally meaning "unknown," when he was conscripted for military service as a cantonist.

During his teens, he went to the Sverdlovsk School № 16. There, he was on friendly terms with another student named Vladimir Vinnichevsky, who later on became a serial killer.

In 1942, at the age of 17, he joined the Red Army as a volunteer. He changed his name to Ernst during this period because the name Erik "sounded childish," but his mother and friends still called him Erik. At the close of World War II, he was heavily wounded and sustained a clinical death. Although he was awarded the Order of the Red Star "posthumously" and his mother received an official notification that her son had died, Neizvestny managed to survive.

In 1947, Neizvestny was enrolled at the Art Academy of Latvia in Riga. He continued his education at the Surikov Moscow Art Institute and the Philosophy Department of the Moscow State University. His sculptures, often based on the forms of the human body, are noted for their expressionism and powerful plasticity. Although his preferred material was bronze, his larger, monumental installations were often executed in concrete. Most of his works are arranged in extensive cycles, the best known of which is The Tree of Life, a theme he had developed since 1956.

== Confrontations with Khrushchev ==
In November 1962, Neizvestny was invited to contribute to an exhibition organised by the Moscow Union of Artists. There was tension between this body and the Academy of Fine Arts, and part of the point of the exhibition was to try to demonstrate that the Academy had too narrow a definition of what constituted art. The exhibition drew large crowds, but the organisers were ordered to close it after a few days, and transfer the exhibits to a building near the Kremlin, which was visited by Nikita Khrushchev, accompanied by a large entourage, and a film crew. He shouted that the exhibits were "Dog shit!", and picked out Neizvestny as the person he believed to be in charge. Neizvestny told him: "You may be Premier and Chairman, but not here in front of my works. Here I am Premier and we shall discuss as equals."

As they continued to argue, someone in Khrushchev's entourage called Neizvestny a homosexual, but 'after excusing himself to Minister of Culture Yekaterina Furtseva', Neizvestny replied: "Give me a girl right here and now and I'll show what sort of homosexual I am." At the end of the session, Khrushchev told him: "You are the kind of man I like. There's an angel and a devil in you. If the angel wins, we can get along together. If it's the devil who wins, we'll destroy you."

On 15 December, Neizvestny was among 400 guests invited to hear Khrushchev speak at Moscow's House of Receptions. Khrushchev reputedly intended to be conciliatory, but went off script and pointing at one of Neizvestny's statues and demanded: "is that a horse or a cow? Whatever it is, it makes an ugly mockery of a perfectly noble animal." Pointing at another he said: "If that's supposed to be a woman, then you're a faggot. And the sentence for them is ten years in prison." He went on to compare looking at Neizvestny's work to being in a toilet looking up while someone else was sitting on it.

Despite these insults, in 1975, four years after Khrushchev's death, his family commissioned Neizvestny to design the monument over his grave at the Novodevichy Cemetery.

== Art career ==
Other well-known works he created during the Soviet period include Prometheus in Artek (1966). Much of his art from the Soviet era was destroyed before he was forcibly exiled to America.

Neizvestny's talent for large monumental sculptures was again recognized when in the late 1980s six Taiwan cities commissioned the New Statue of Liberty to be built in Kaohsiung harbor. Like the original in New York, it was planned to be 152 feet tall. Several models were built. At least one about five feet tall, and approximately 13 smaller bronzes, each slightly over 18 inches, sold to clients of Magna Gallery in San Francisco. Although the authorized maximum number of signed and numbered castings was 200, far fewer were actually cast and sold, in part because the monument was never built in Taiwan. The reasons are largely political and are described in Albert Leong's bio of Neizvestny, referred to below.

During the 1980s, Neizvestny was a visiting lecturer at the University of Oregon and at UC Berkeley. He also worked with Magna Gallery in San Francisco and had a number of shows which were well-attended in the mid to late 1980s. This gallery also asked him to create his suite of five original graphics, "Man through the Wall," to mark the end of Communism at the end of the 1980s. Magna Gallery was closed at the end of 1992.

During this time, Neizvestny worked diligently to get his dream "Tree of Life" monumental sculpture funded and built. Several small versions or spinoffs based on the theme were built, but the enormous monumental version that Neizvestny dreamed to build, inside which people could walk, has not been built although it has been fully conceptualized, planned out and detailed by the artist as a labor of love.

In 1996, Neizvestny completed his Mask of Sorrow, a 15-metre (49 ft) tall monument to the victims of Soviet purges, situated in Magadan. The same year, he was awarded the State Prize of the Russian Federation. Although he lived in New York City and worked at Columbia University, Neizvestny frequently visited Moscow and celebrated his 80th birthday there. A museum dedicated to his sculptures was established in Uttersberg, Sweden. Some of his crucifixion statues were acquired by John Paul II for the Vatican Museums. In 2004, Neizvestny became an honorary member of the Russian Academy of Arts.

In 1995, he participated as a painter in the jubilee exhibition on Gogol Boulevard, dedicated to the 20th anniversary of the exhibition of painting in the pavilion "beekeeping" at VDNH with Eduard Drobitsky, Julia Dolgorukova and other nonconformist artists.

A biography of Neizvestny was written by University of Oregon professor Albert Leong in 2002 entitled: Centaur: The Life and Art of Ernst Neizvestny. Another book about Neizvestny is Art and Revolution: Ernst Neizvestny, Endurance, and the Role of the Artist, written by British art critic John Berger in 1969.

He died on 9 August 2016 in New York.

== Gallery ==
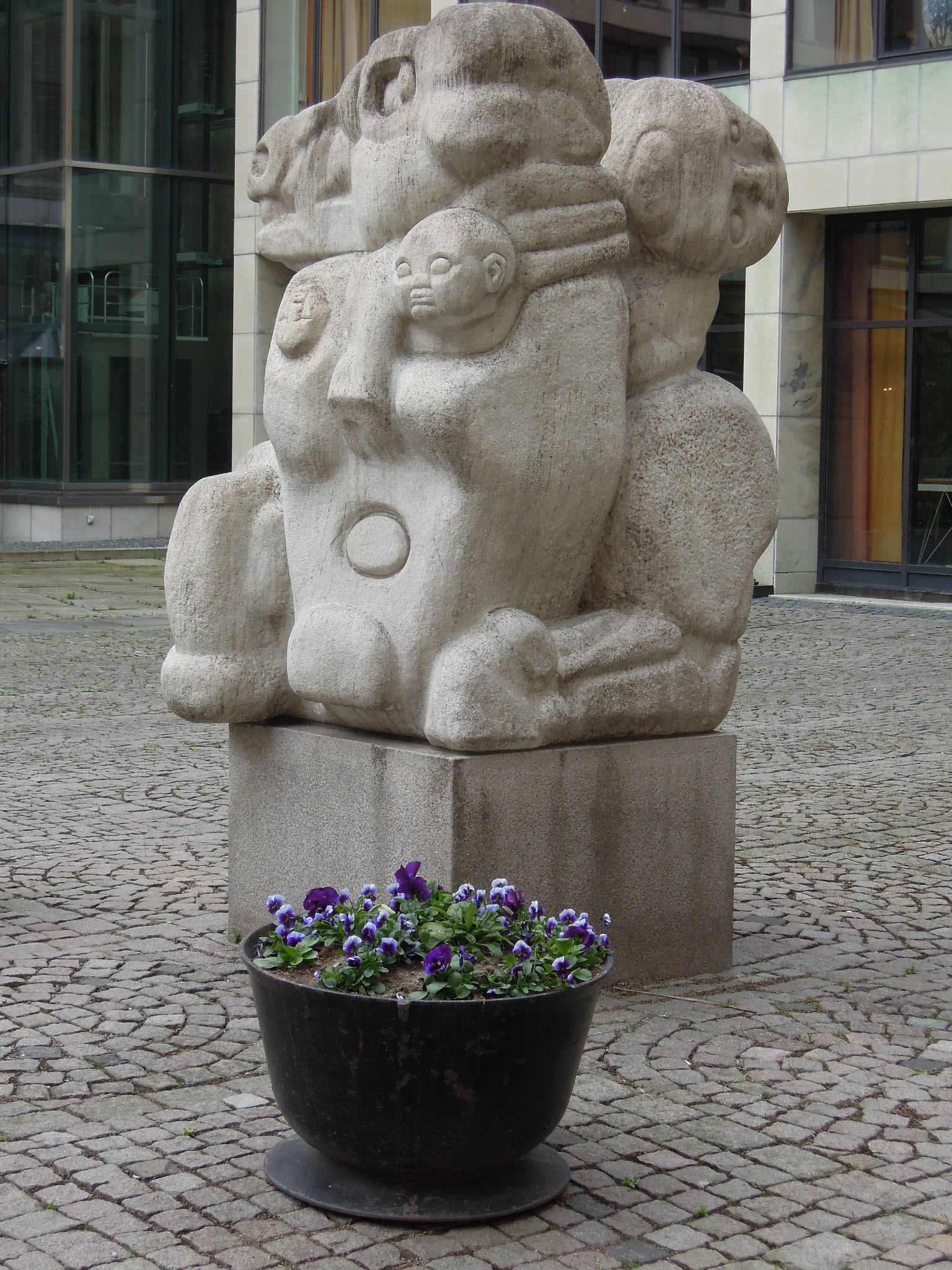
Centaur, 1980s. Västerås Municipality, Sweden

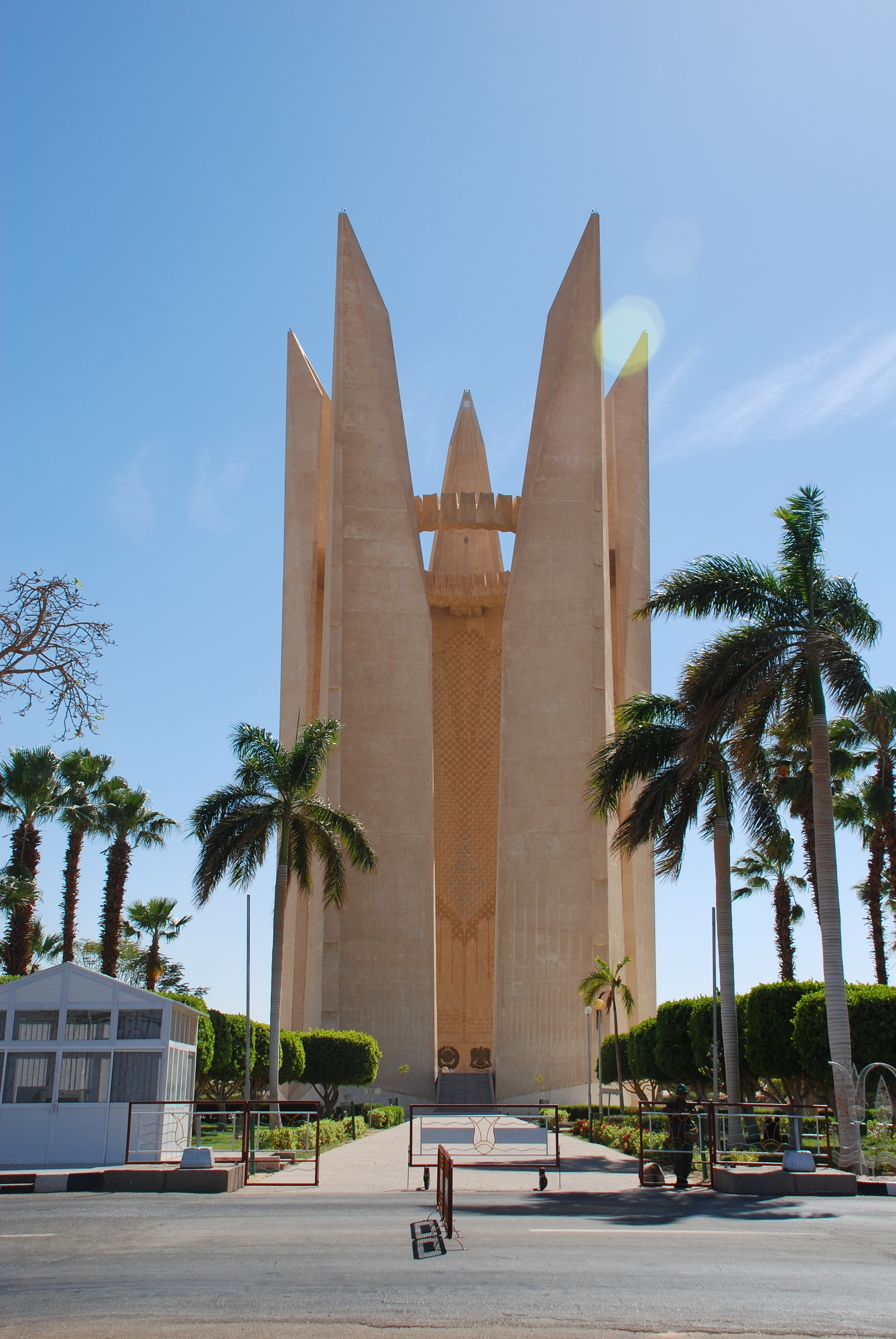
Lotus Flower, 1971, Aswan High Dam, Egypt

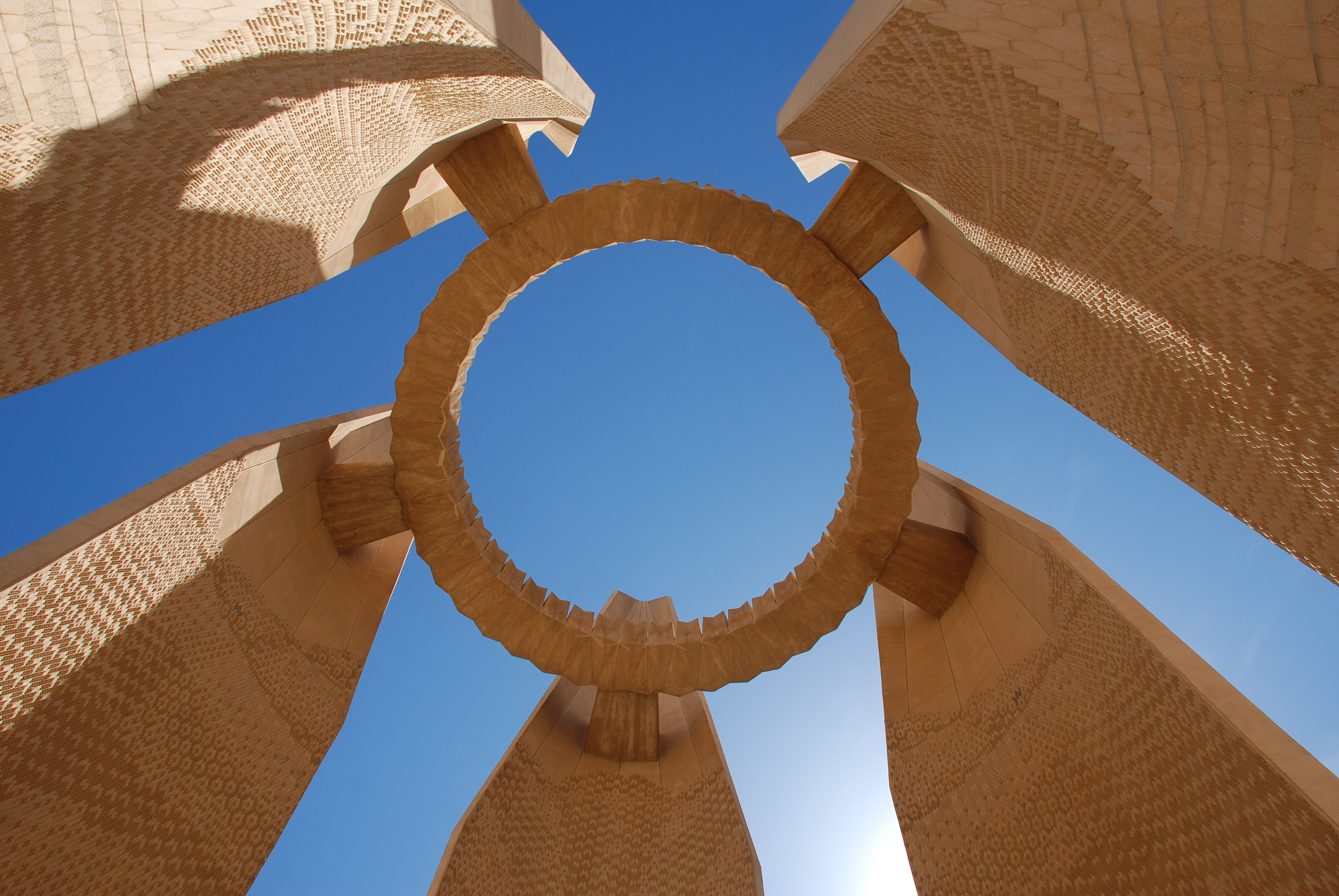
Interior of Lotus Flower, 1971, Aswan High Dam

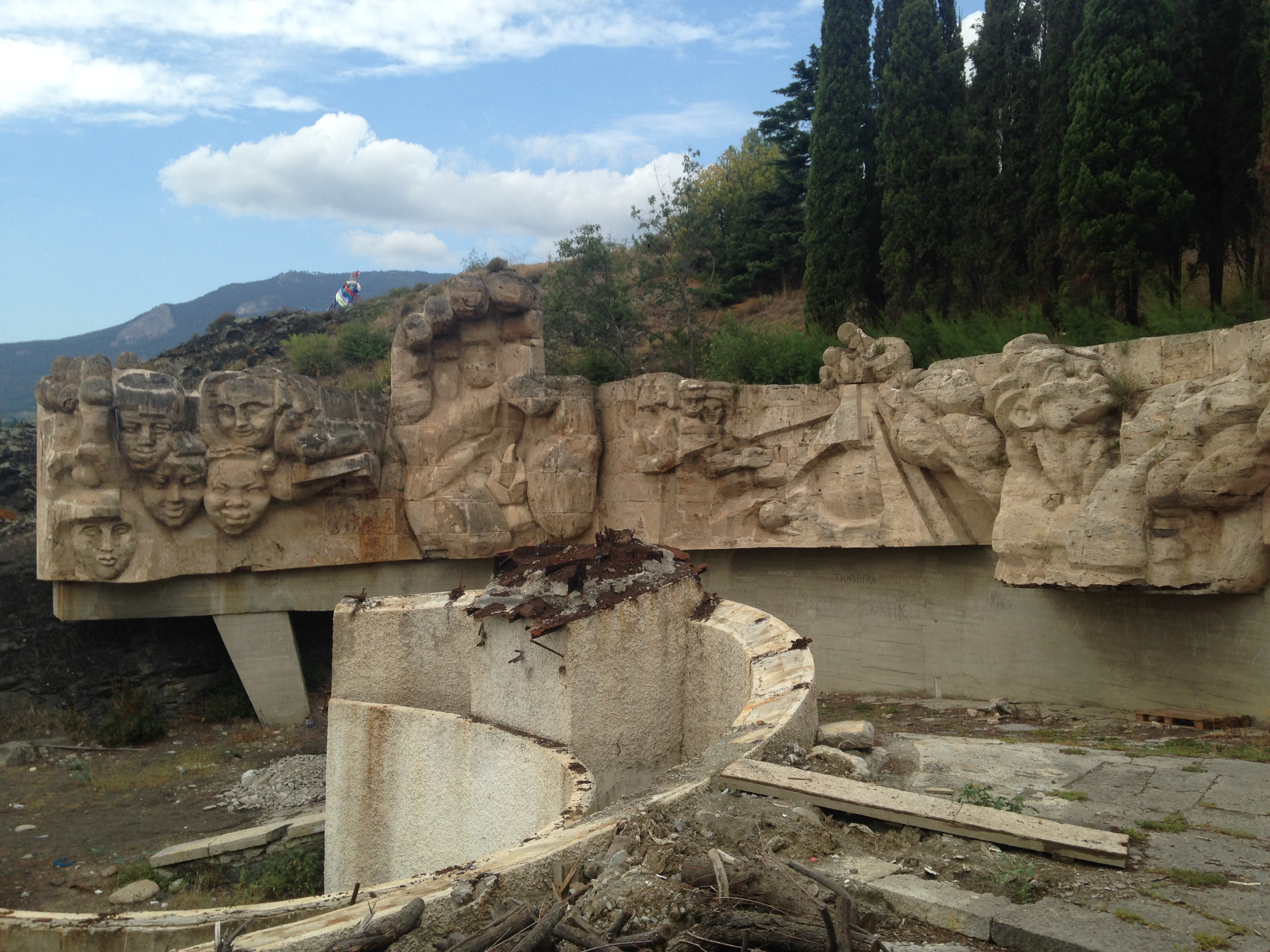
Friendship of the Children of the World, 1967, at the Artek children's camp, Crimea

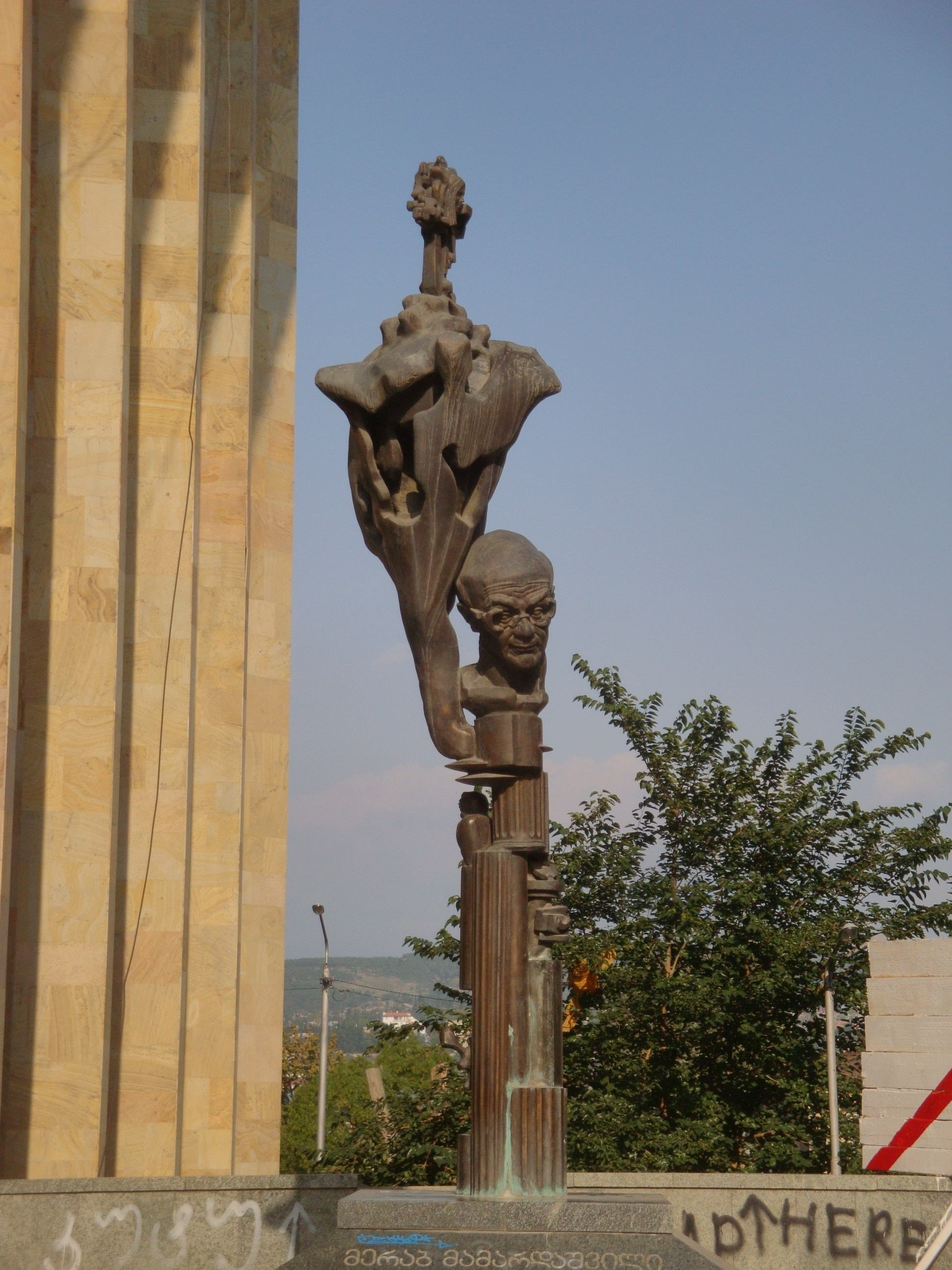
Monument to the Georgian philosopher Merab Mamardashvili, in Tbilisi

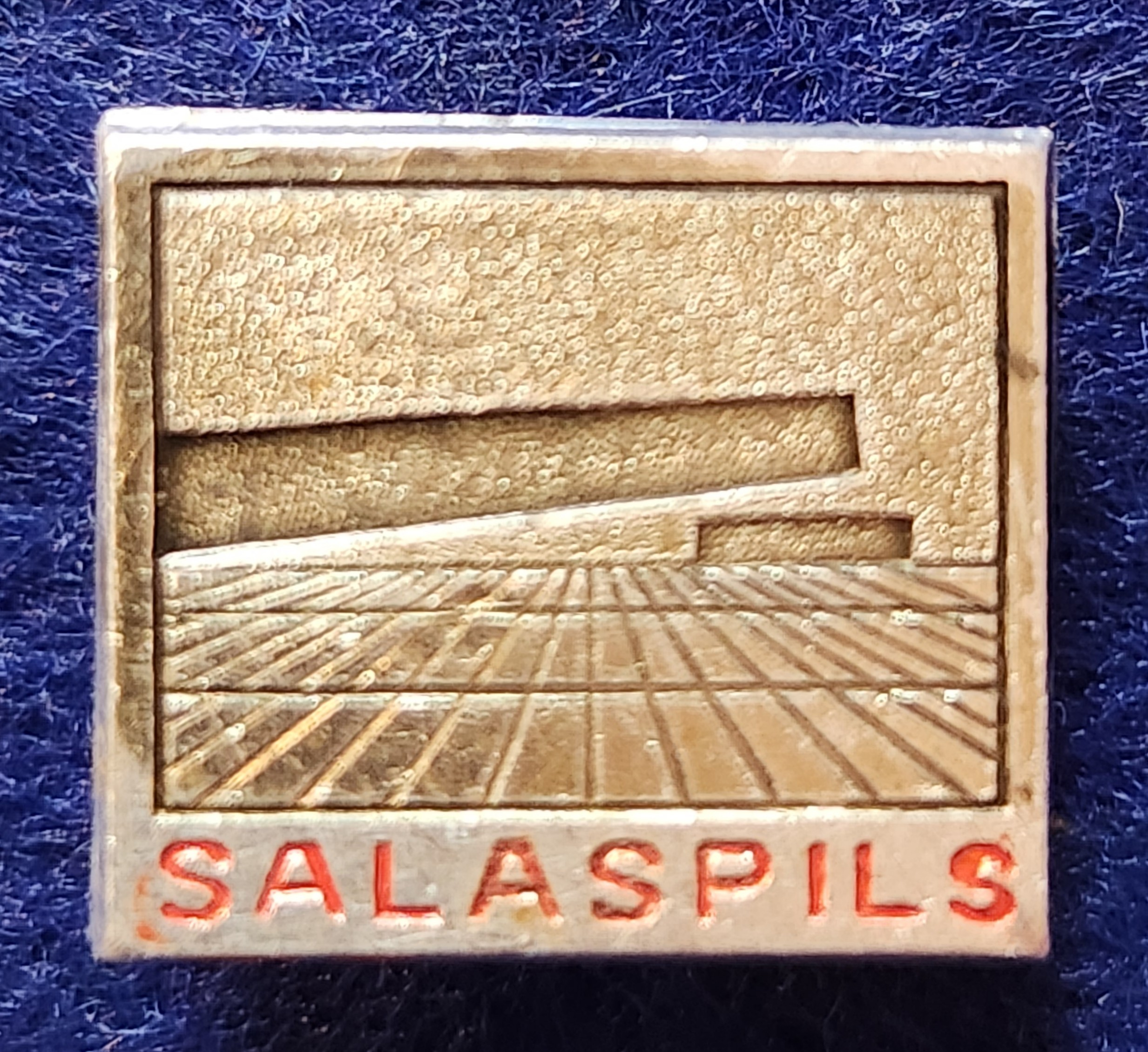
Memorial for Salaspils concentration camp, Latvia

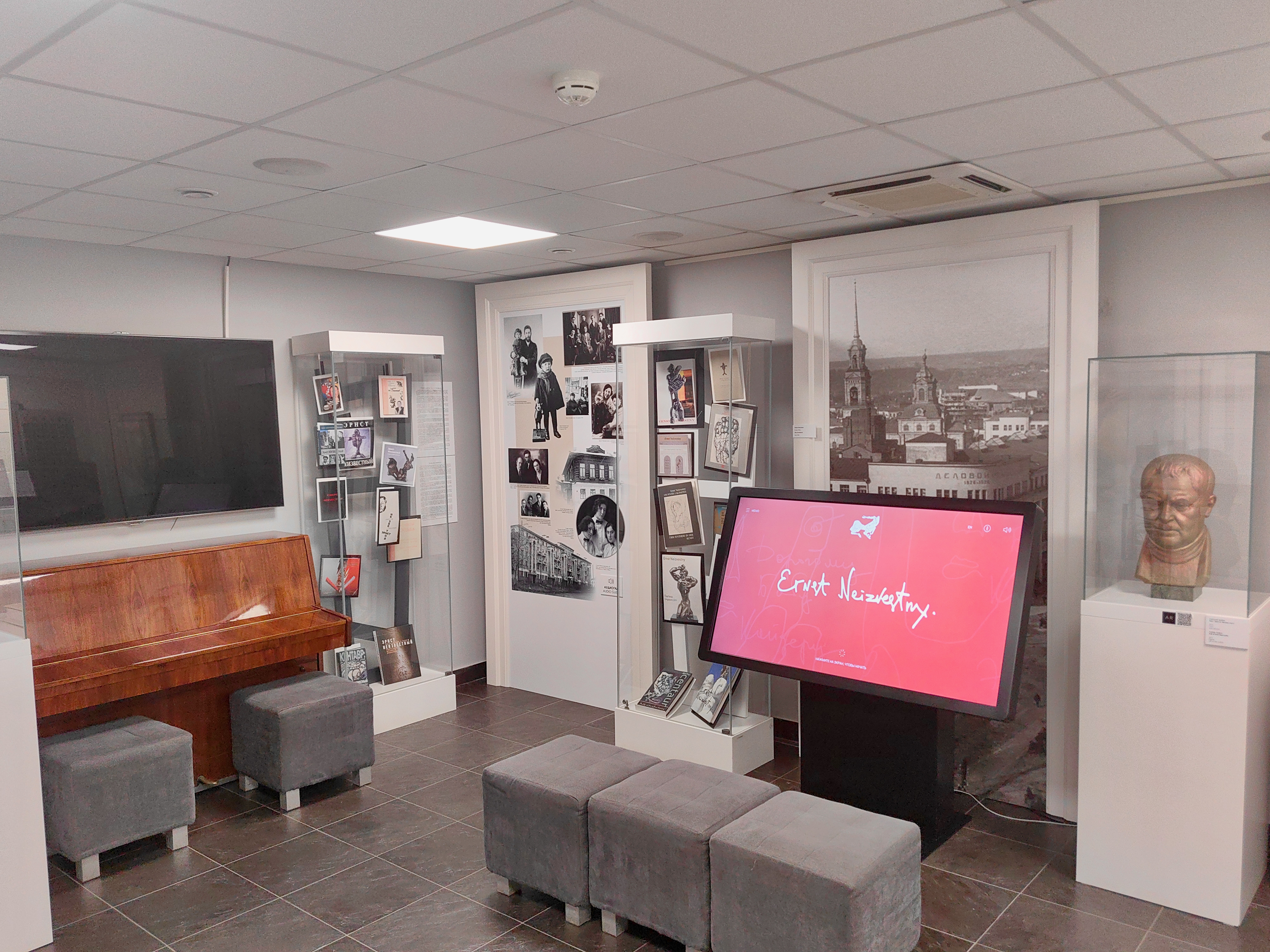
Neizvestny museum in Yekaterinburg, Ural Federal District, Russia

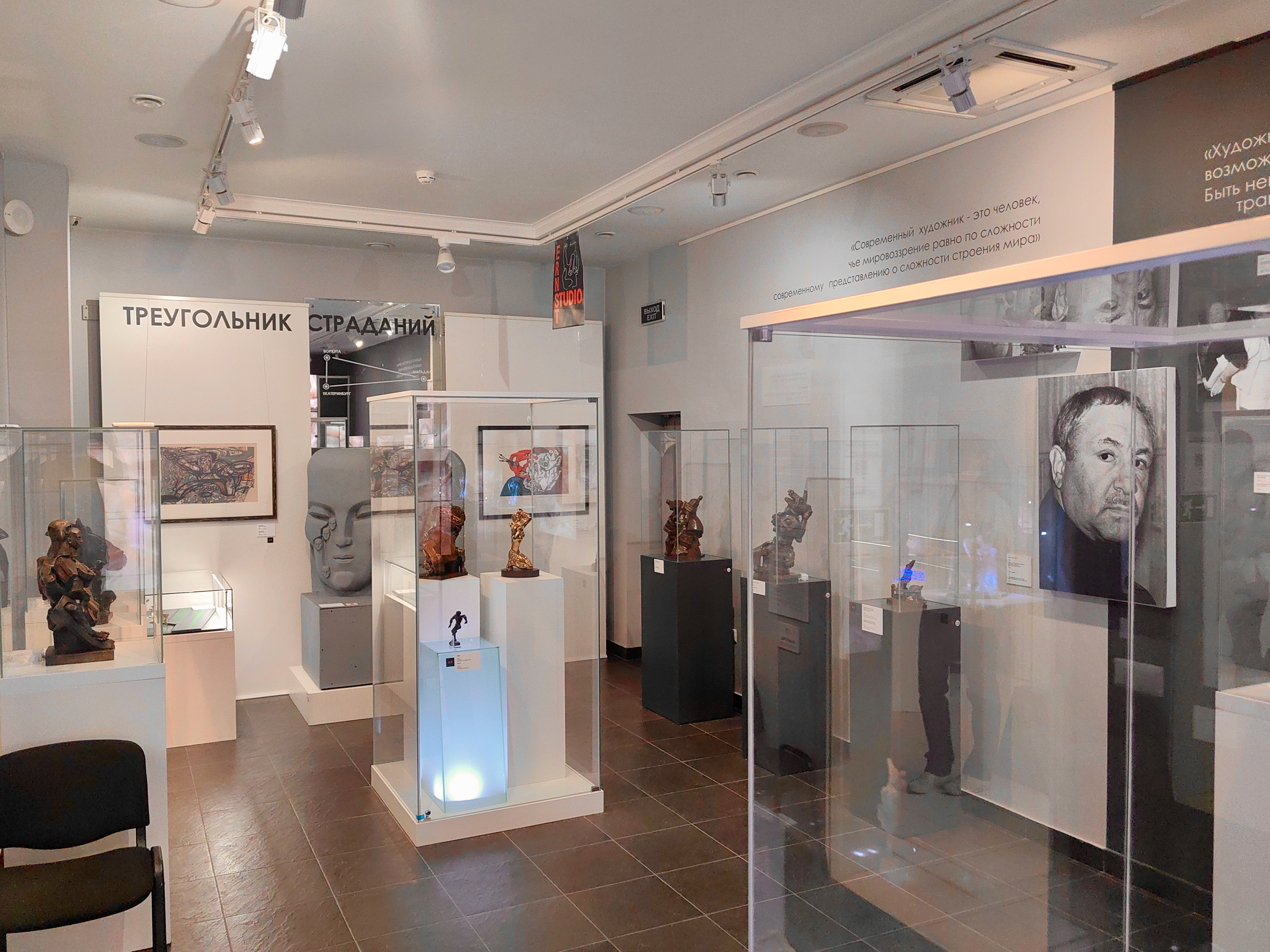
Neizvestny Museum, Yekaterinburg

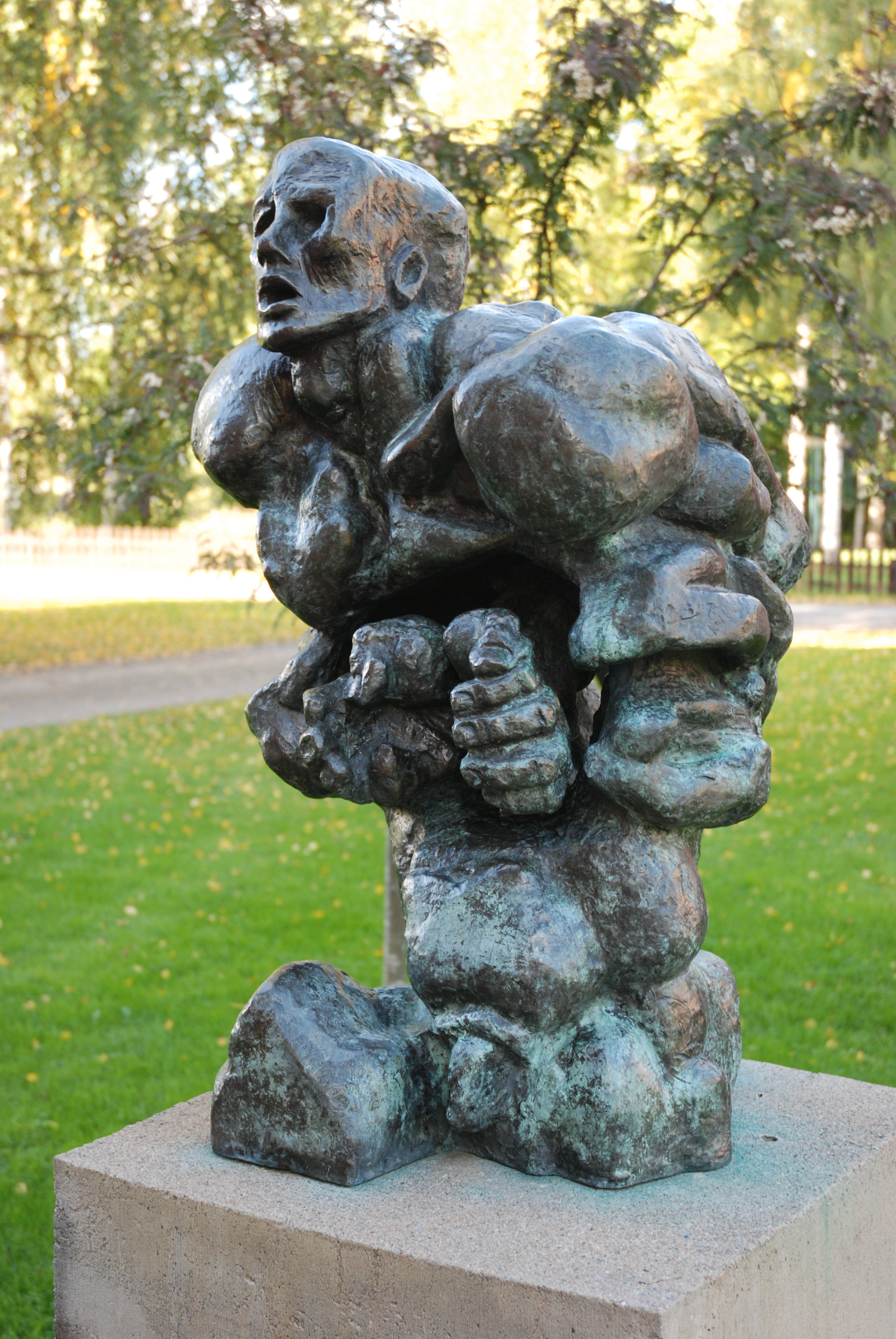
The Prophet, Galleri Astley, Sweden

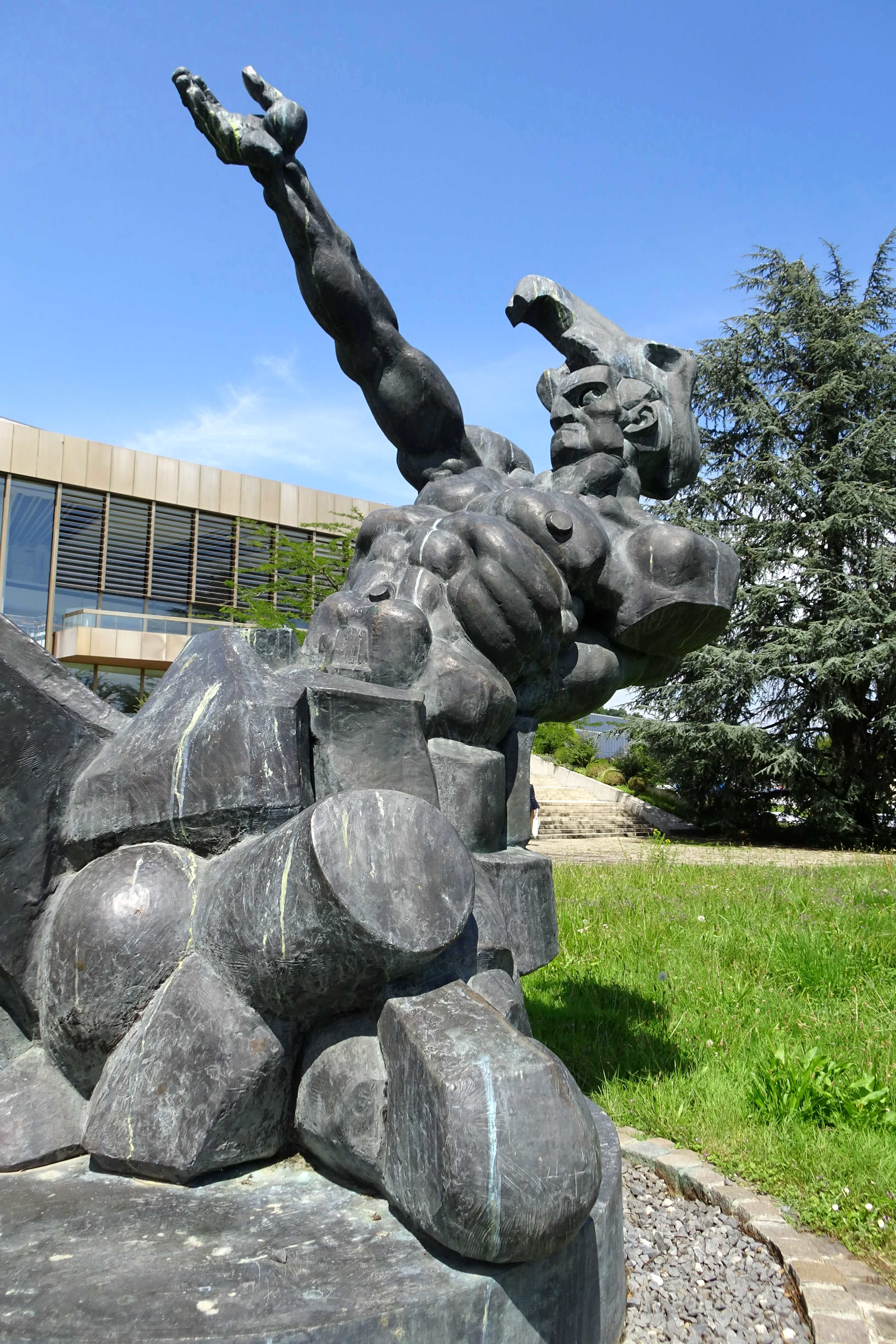
The Great Centaur, at the Palace of Nations, Geneva

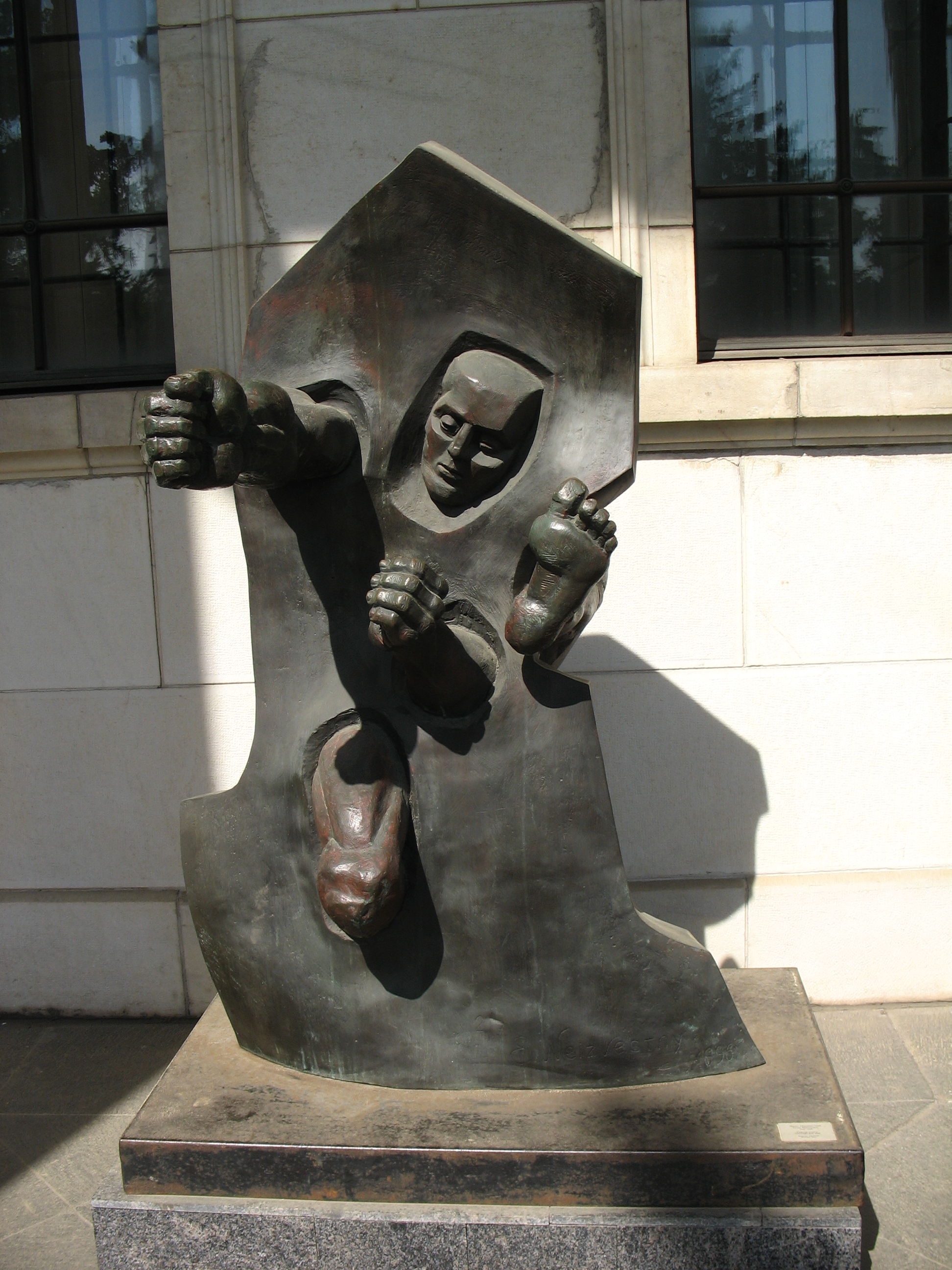
Sculpture at the Pushkin Museum, Moscow

== Awards and decorations ==
- Order of the Red Star (1945)
- Order "For Merit to the Fatherland", third class
- Order of Honour
- State Prize of the Russian Federation

== Bibliography ==
- N. V. Voronov, Ernst Neizvestny. Moscow, 1991. Berger, John. Art and Revolution. Ernst Neizvestny and the Role of the Artist in the U.S.S.R. Harmondsworth: Penguin, 1969. Leong, Albert. Centaur: The Life and Art of Ernst Neizvestny. Lanham: Rowman & Littlefield, 2002.
