= Mask of Sorrow =

Monument in Magadan, Russia

Coordinates: 59°35′30.62″N 150°48′43.65″E

- Маска скорби
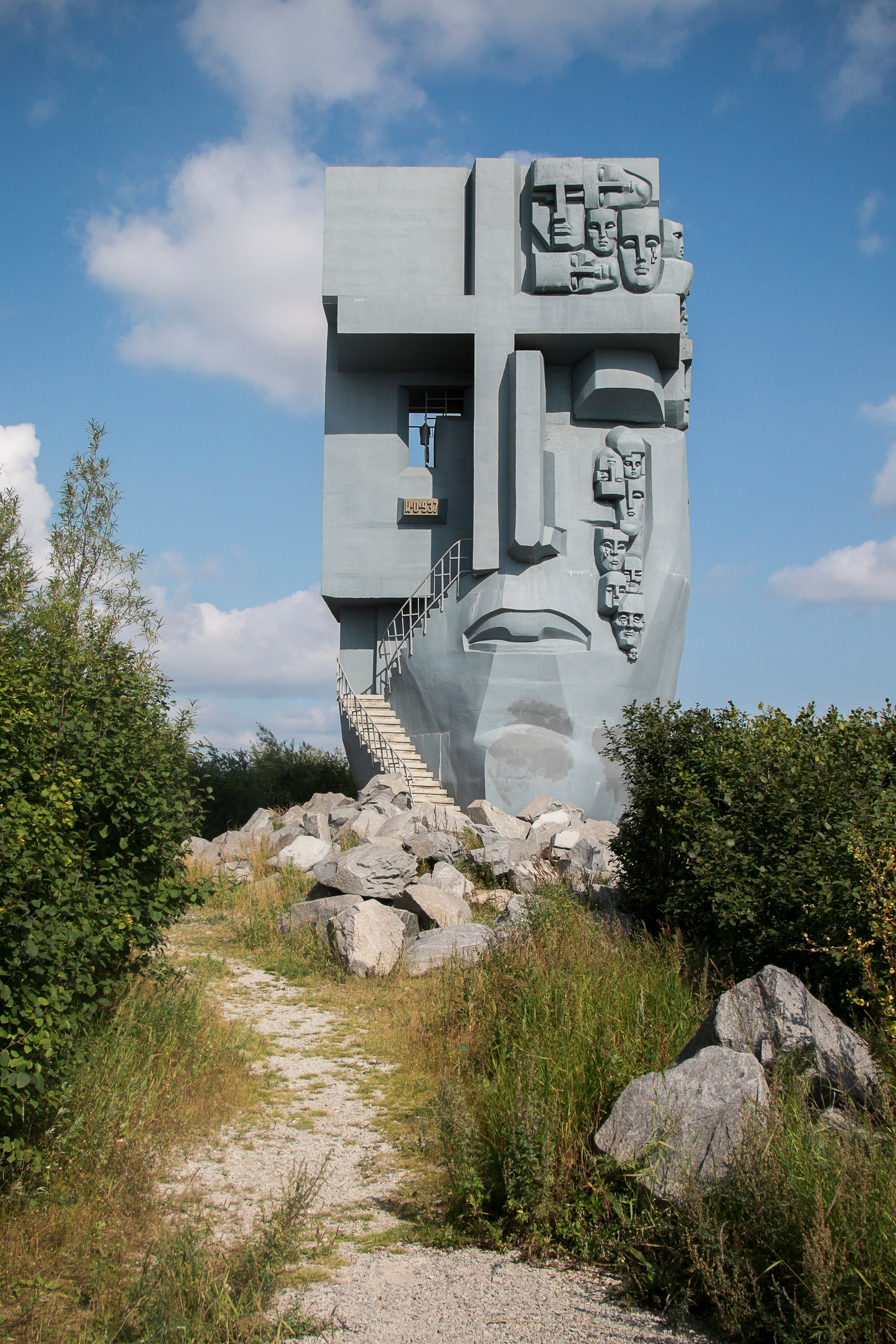
- Monument in 2017
- Location: Magadan, Russia
- Designer: Ernst Neizvestny
- Height: 15 meters
- Opening date: June 12, 1996
- Website: Official website

The Mask of Sorrow (Russian: Маска скорби, romanized: Maska skorbi) is a monument located on a hill above Magadan, Russia, commemorating the many prisoners who suffered and died in the Gulag prison camps in the Kolyma region of the Soviet Union during the 1930s, 1940s, and 1950s.

It consists of a large concrete statue of a face, with tears coming from the left eye in the form of small masks. The right eye is in the form of a barred window. The back side portrays a weeping young woman and a man on a cross with his head hanging backwards. Inside is a replication of a typical Stalin-era prison cell. Below the Mask of Sorrow are stone markers bearing the names of many of the forced-labor camps of the Kolyma, as well as others designating the various religions and political systems of those who suffered there.

The statue was unveiled on June 12, 1996 with the help of the Russian government and financial contributions from seven Russian cities, including Magadan. The design was created by renowned sculptor Ernst Neizvestny. The monument was constructed by Kamil Kazaev. It is 15 metres high and takes up 56 cubic metres of space.

== Gallery ==
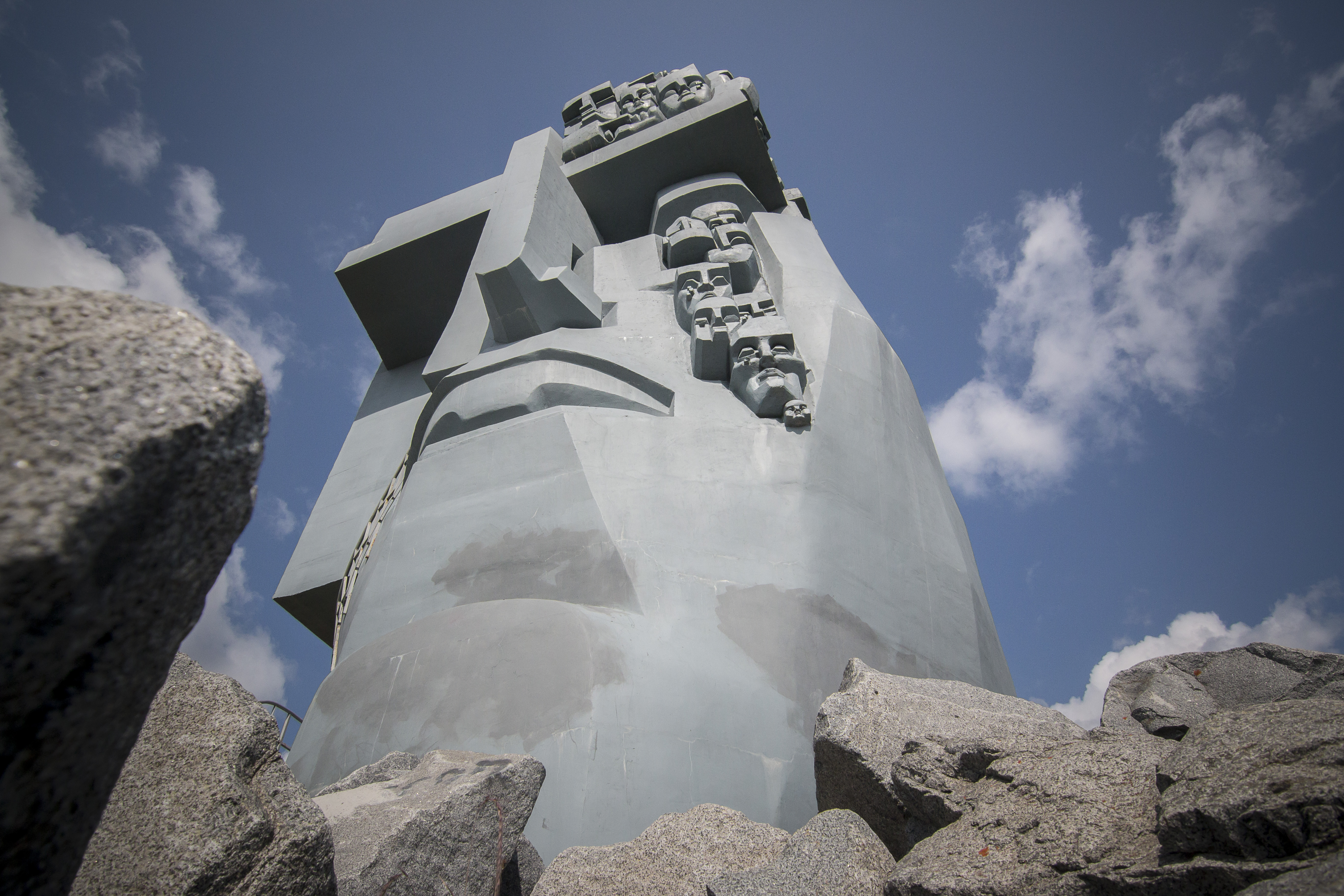
Looking at the monument from below

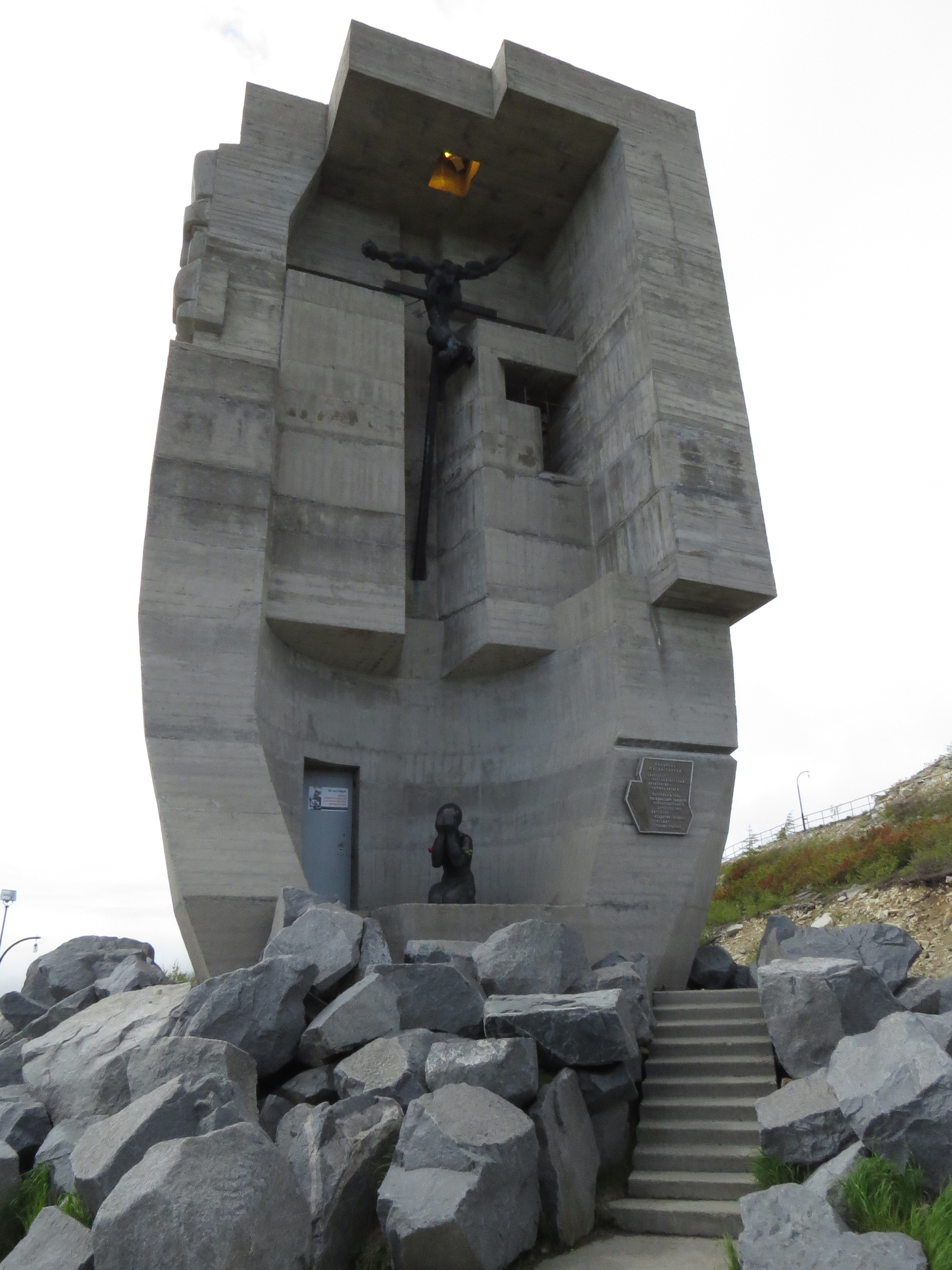
Back side of the monument, showing a weeping young woman and a damaged crucifix

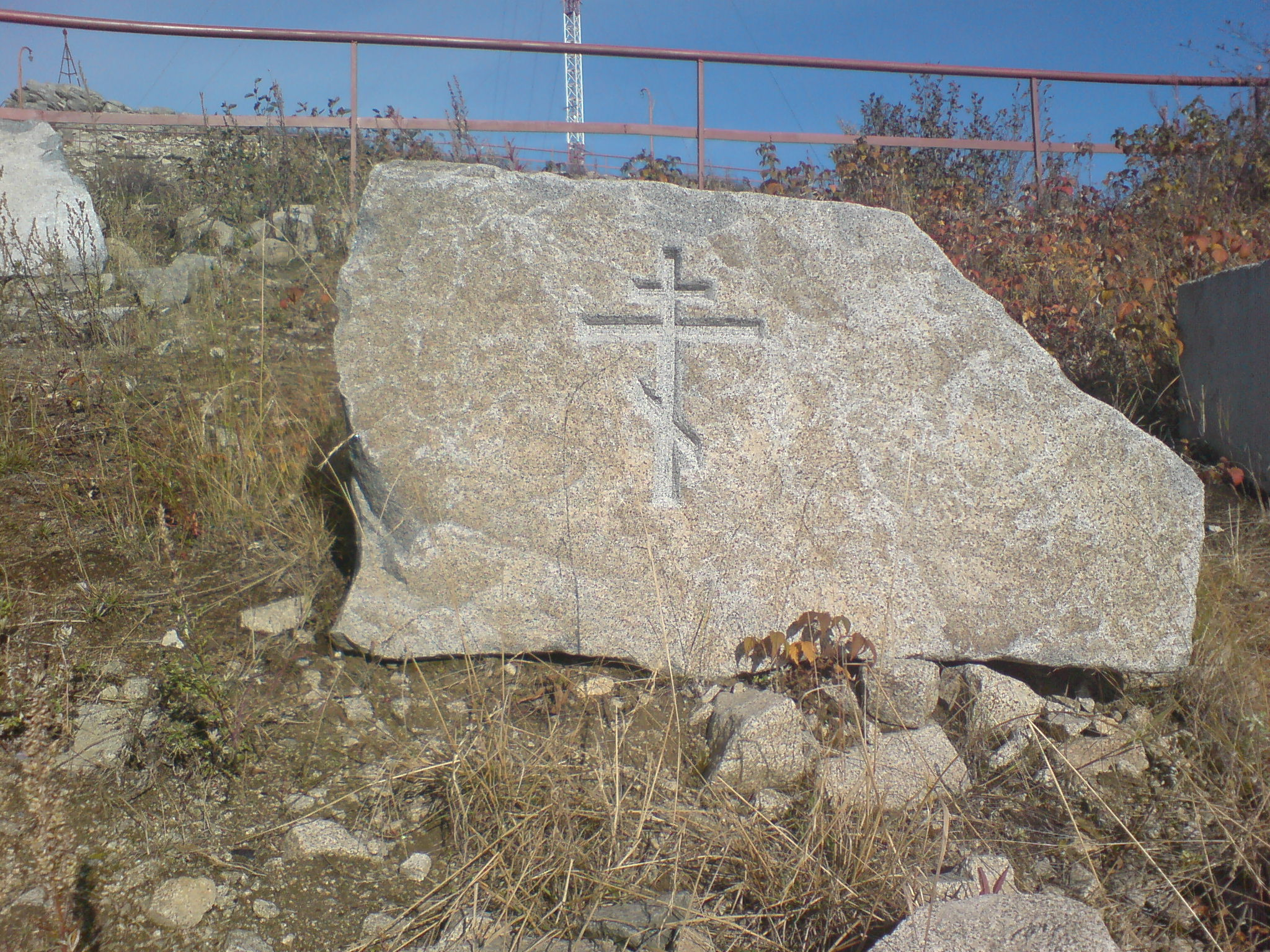
One of many religious symbols carved into stone sitting on the side of the pathway up to the mask of sorrow. This is an Eastern Orthodox cross

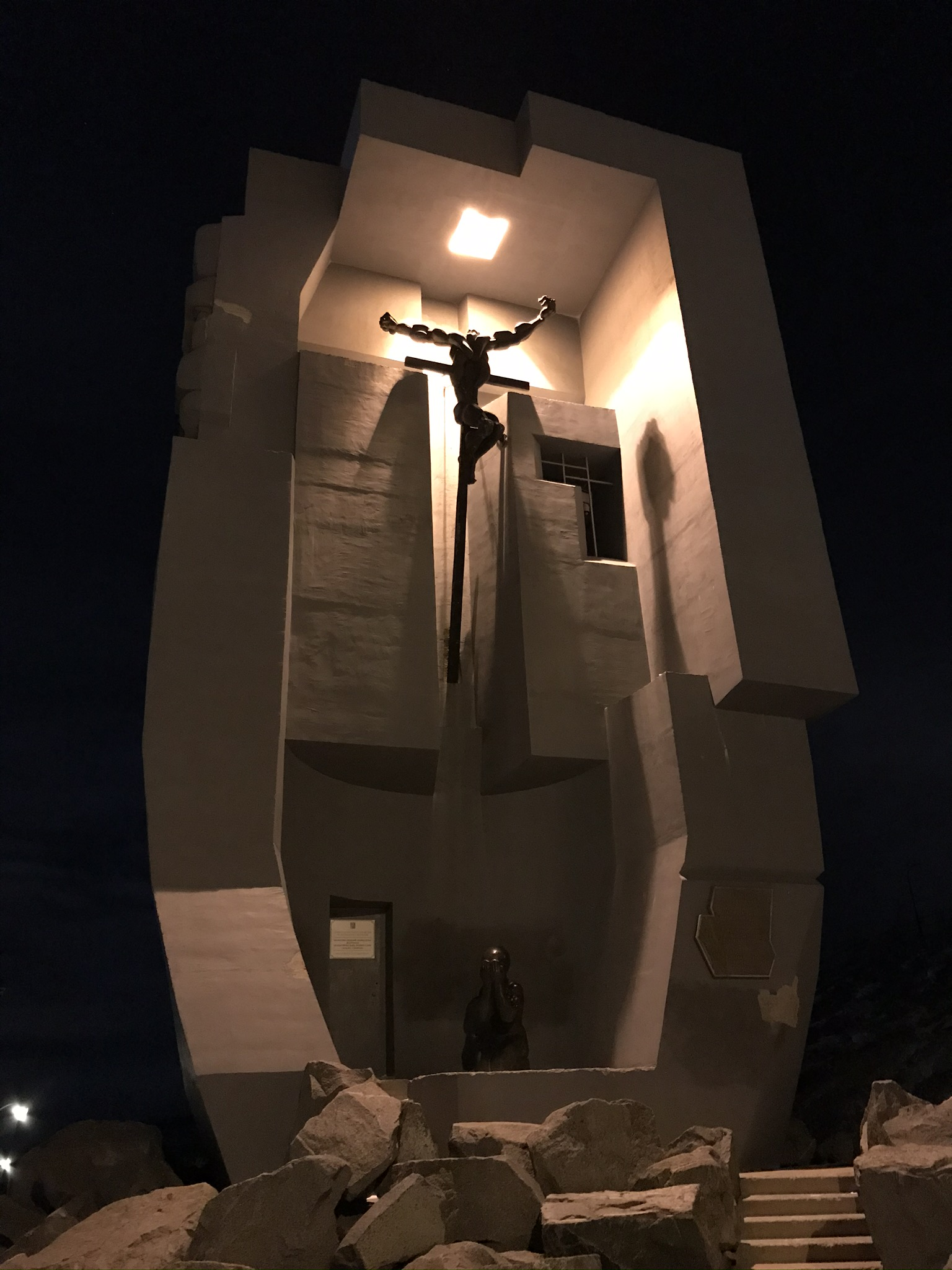
Monument at night

== See also ==
- Sevvostlag
- Butugychag
- Serpantinka
