= Serpantinka =

Place of detention and execution during Stalinism, in eastern Russia

- Extermination camp
- Location within the Soviet Union
- Coordinates: 62°42′8″N 150°1′5″E
- Other names: Komandirovka Serpantinnaya
- Location: Magadan Oblast, Russia
- Operated by: NKVD
- Commandant: Maksimov
- Original use: road-building
- Operational: Great Purge
- Killed: unknown

Serpantinka (Russian: Серпантинка) or Serpantinnaya (Russian: Серпантинная) is the informal name for the place of detention and execution at the times of Stalinism, located in the Kolyma region. It was under control of Sevvostlag (a directorate of the Gulag), and the local NKVD troika used it as the second major place for the enforcement of their death sentences during the Great Terror. The few survivors recall "Serpantinka" as one of the most brutal sites, even among Stalin's camps in the Kolyma area.

== Background ==
In the early thirties, the Soviet leadership decided to start accelerated development of the Kolyma River basin in a very remote and sparsely populated region in the north-east of the USSR, where rich deposits of gold and tin were found. To accomplish this task, a "special type industrial complex" was created, known under the abbreviation "Dalstroy". An important role in these plans was played by the so-called Corrective labor camps, where prisoners had to work in extremely severe conditions. These camps in the Kolyma region were under the control of Sevvostlag, which was only formally subordinate to the 'Main Directorate of Camps'. Despite the cruel exploitation of prisoners, initially the local governance was not interested in their deaths. This situation changed with the start of the Great Terror, when many thousands of people who were already in the camps were sentenced to death. The attitude towards the prisoners also deteriorated sharply, among other things the length of the working day was increased from 10 to 16 hours. This led to mass death of prisoners from backbreaking work, hunger and disease. At this time, many prisoners in Kolyma camps were convicted of "political" (cont-revolutionary) crimes (45.8% at 1939). However, sometimes there were even fewer people convicted of ordinary crimes — for example, in 1938 there were only 16.3% of them in the camps of the Southern Mining Administration, and 76.8% were "counter-revolutionaries".

== Location ==
Serpantinka. Drawing of an unknown prisoner. Pen on paper. From the collection of the Magadan Museum of Local Lore.

So-called Serpantinka was located near the village of Khatenakh or Khatynnakh, now non-existent (not to be confused with a village in the Sakha Republic). Georgy Wagner, a renowned art historian who was in prison in Khatynnakh at the time, recalls that the ominous "Serpantinka" was visible from there. Presumably, it was located in the place where the road from this village towards the village of Yagodnoye twisted along the slopes (serpantine is the Russian name for a hairpin turn). Nearby flows a stream called "Sniper". One of the testimonies, that Robert Conquest cites, claims that on the site of the future camp there were a few barracks, called Serpantinnaya, in which the road-building unit had been located. By the time the NKVD decided to use this place for setting up a camp, the road was completed and the place had been empty for over a year.

== Regime in the camp and organization of executions ==
Serpantinka, according to testimonies, was a small camp - a few barracks (more precisely, three), a house for officials and guards, and a garage. The garage was an unusual object for such a small camp, especially since there were already large garages nearby. The testimonies describe that the number of prisoners was too large for such a small camp. Trying to describe the incredible tightness in the barracks, they use such images as "a man was dying and could not fall", "people could not free their hand to take pieces of ice (they were given instead of water) and caught them with their mouths" and the like. In such conditions, prisoners could spend many days waiting for their turn to be shot. When the execution began, the engines of the tractors in the garage were turned on so that their noise drowned out the sounds of the shots. The bodies of the dead were taken away on sledges in an unknown direction. The inmates assumed that they were dumped into some kind of pit or buried in parallel trenches on the slope.

One of the witnesses wrote in his memoirs:

At the end of the sixties, a certain Markelov D. came to me in Chisinau, who continued to work in Kolyma. He said that the hill above the former Serpantinka, the building of which was dismantled back in 1939, was blown up to throw at the place where several thousand people were buried, and then the bulldozer had leveled the ground for the whole summer in order to bury the cemetery deeper. My comrades got into this punitive confinement and ended their days there.

Very few documents have survived concerning the organization of the Great Terror at low levels. However, there is a unique correspondence between the local departments of the NKVD, located in the village of Khatynnakh, with the NKVD Directorate, located 375 miles away, in Magadan. The cases of the prisoners were considered as follows: for example, on 29 January 1938, the head of the regional NKVD department of the Road Construction Directorate sent to Magadan 30 formalized case records, "approved" by the NKVD "troika" for Dalstroy two days before in the village of Orotukan (something like a visiting session) . Then follows a list of 30 names, sent to the head of the regional department of the NKVD for the Northern Mining Administration which was also located in the village of Khatynnakh. One name from this list was crossed out. And then there is a receipt from Maksimov, the head of the "komandirovka Serpantinnaya", that he received 29 convicts. Probably, usually the "troika" made their decisions, even without having case records before their eyes.

== Number of victims ==
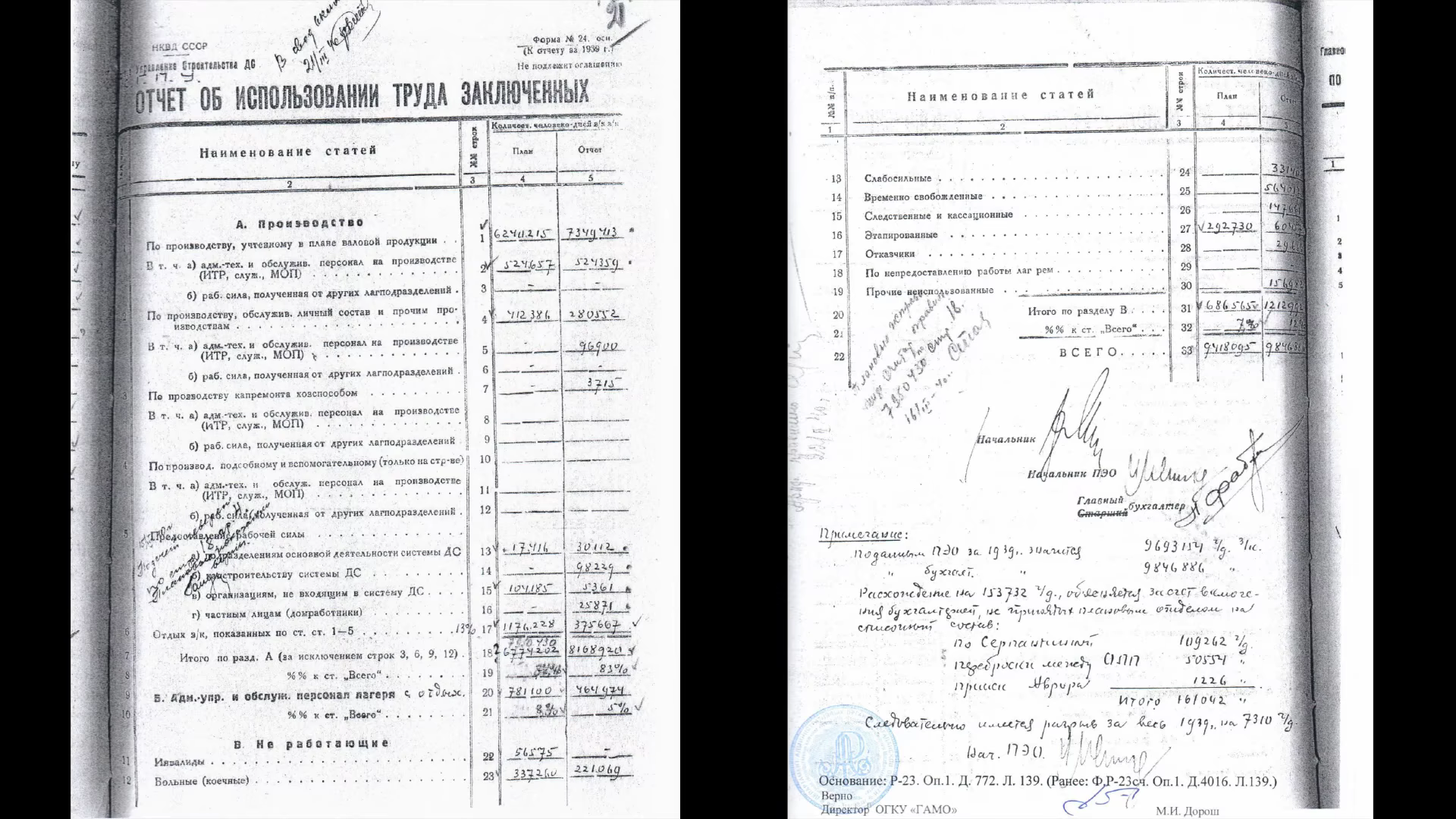
A copy of an archival file concerning the use of prisoner labor in Stalin's camps in the Kolyma region. According to this document, there was a gap in the records in 1939, mainly due to an object called 'Serpantinnaya'.

Alexander Mikaberidze estimates the number of victims at 30 thousands, shot or died of exhaustion. Robert Conquest says 26,000 people were killed in Kolyma in 1938 in "Serpantinka-type operations". Post-Soviet Russian researchers point out that Conquest did not have access to the archives and his numbers are often overstated. At the same time, archival documents about the Dalstroy camp system were withdrawn from the files in 1953, 1958 and 1961 and probably destroyed. The Russian historian Navasardov found out that there were two "troikas" of the NKVD, who considered the cases of prisoners at Dalstroy in pursuance of order No. 00447. The first "troika" issued 2,428 execution orders. Then the leadership of Dalstroy under the head of Eduard Berzin was arrested and mostly executed, and a new team sent from Moscow took up the proceeding of the prisoners' cases in December 1937. The new troika sentenced 5801 people to death in 11 months. The historian points out that these death sentences were carried out both in Magadan and Serpantinka, but does not give the number of those executed in the second case. Also, not all sentences were carried out. Russian historians Batsaev and Kozlov note that there is still a lot of unknown in the activities of the first "troika". Thus, the number of death sentences handed down in August–September 1937, when the operation began in execution of order No. 004447, is unknown, as well as the composition of the first "troika".

As the book Ships will come for us points out, prior to the De-Stalinization — and this continued even after Stalin's own death — the NKVD/KGB fabricated certificates regarding the fate of prisoners by recording false dates, places, and circumstances of their death. Also, according to the author, those sentenced to death sometimes died from the unbearable conditions of confinement before their turn for execution came. One such example dates back to 1939, when NKVD officers who had survived the Great Purge encountered contradictory records: according to one document, a certain Nikiforov was executed on February 7, 1938, at the "Stan Khatynnakh" but according to another, he died on February 13, 1938, on a "special komandirovka Serpantinnaya". The book provides data on the number of people shot at the "Stan Khatynnakh" (that is, on Serpantinka) on some days:

February 4, 1938, Stan Khatynnakh, - 56 people,
February 5, in the same place - 17 people,
February 7, in the same place - 204 people,
February 24, in same place, - 53 people,
March 4–5, in the same place, - 94 people,
March 7, in the same place, - 70 people,
March 8, in the same place, - 64 people,
March 9, in the same place - 157 people,
March 10–14, in the same place - 253 people.

The Gulag Archipelago (cited by Conquest) states that 30-50 people were shot in Serpantinka a day. In his memoirs, survivor Ilya Taratin reported seeing 70 executions in one night.

== Memory ==
A concrete block with the name of the Serpantinka camp as part of the "Mask of Sorrow" monument in Magadan (foto by imagadan.livejournal.com)

On June 22, 1991, a monument was opened near the pass Khatynnakh, where road from the village of Yagodnoye, that departs from the Kolyma highway, goes toward the former village (urochishche) Khatynnakh. It was one of the first monuments in the USSR to victims of political repressions.

Subsequently, in 2007, a commemorative pavilion was built next to the memorial.

The Mask of Sorrow monument located in the city of Magadan contains 11 concrete blocks with the names of the GULAG camps in Kolyma, including Serpantinka.

Varlam Shalamov mentioned this camp (sometimes also under the name "Serpantinnaya") in his works. Thus, he wrote:

The documents of our past have been destroyed, the watchtowers taken down, the barracks razed to the ground, the rusty barbed wire wound up and taken away somewhere else. On the ruins of Serpantinka, the willow-herb blossoms – the flower of fire, of oblivion, an enemy of archives and of human memory. Did we exist? I answer: “we existed” – with all the poignancy of a judicial transcript, with the responsibility, the lucidity of a document.

— “The Glove” (1972)

== See also ==
- Great Purge
- Sandarmokh

== Sources ==
- Mikaberidze, Alexander (2018). Behind Barbed Wire: An Encyclopedia of Concentration and Prisoner-of-War Camps. ABC-CLIO. pp. 239–240. ISBN 978-1-4408-5762-1.
- Conquest, Robert (1979). Kolyma: The Arctic Death Camps. Oxford University Press. ISBN 978-0-19-285091-1.
- Kolyma – Off to the Unknown – Stalin's Notorious Prison Camps in Siberia by Ayyub Baghirov (1906–1973)
- Martin J. Bollinger (2003). Stalin's Slave Ships: Kolyma, the Gulag Fleet, and the Role of the West. Greenwood Publishing Group. p. 16. ISBN 978-0-275-98100-6.
- Batsaev, I. D.; Kozlov, A. G. (2002). Дальстрой и Севвостлаг ОГПУ-НКВД СССР в цифрах и документах: 1931-1941 (in Russian). СВКНИИ ДВО РАН. ISBN 9785947290066.
- Batsaev, I. D. (2002). Особенности промышленного освоения Северо-востока России в период массовых политических репрессий (1932-1953). Дальстрой (in Russian). СВКНИИ ДВО РАН. ISBN 5-94729-012-X.
- Navasardov, A. S. (2009). Деятельность тройки УНКВД по Дальстрою. Научные проблемы гуманитарных исследований (in Russian) (12–2): 86–90.
