= Kolyma =

Region of the Russian Far East

Coordinates: 65°0′N 152°0′E

Kolyma Колыма
- Region
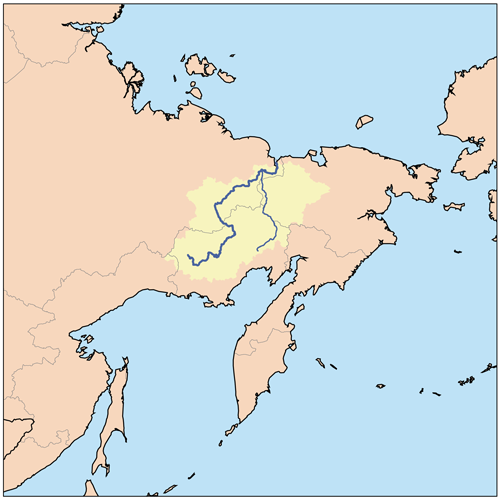
- Kolyma River basin
- Interactive map of Kolyma

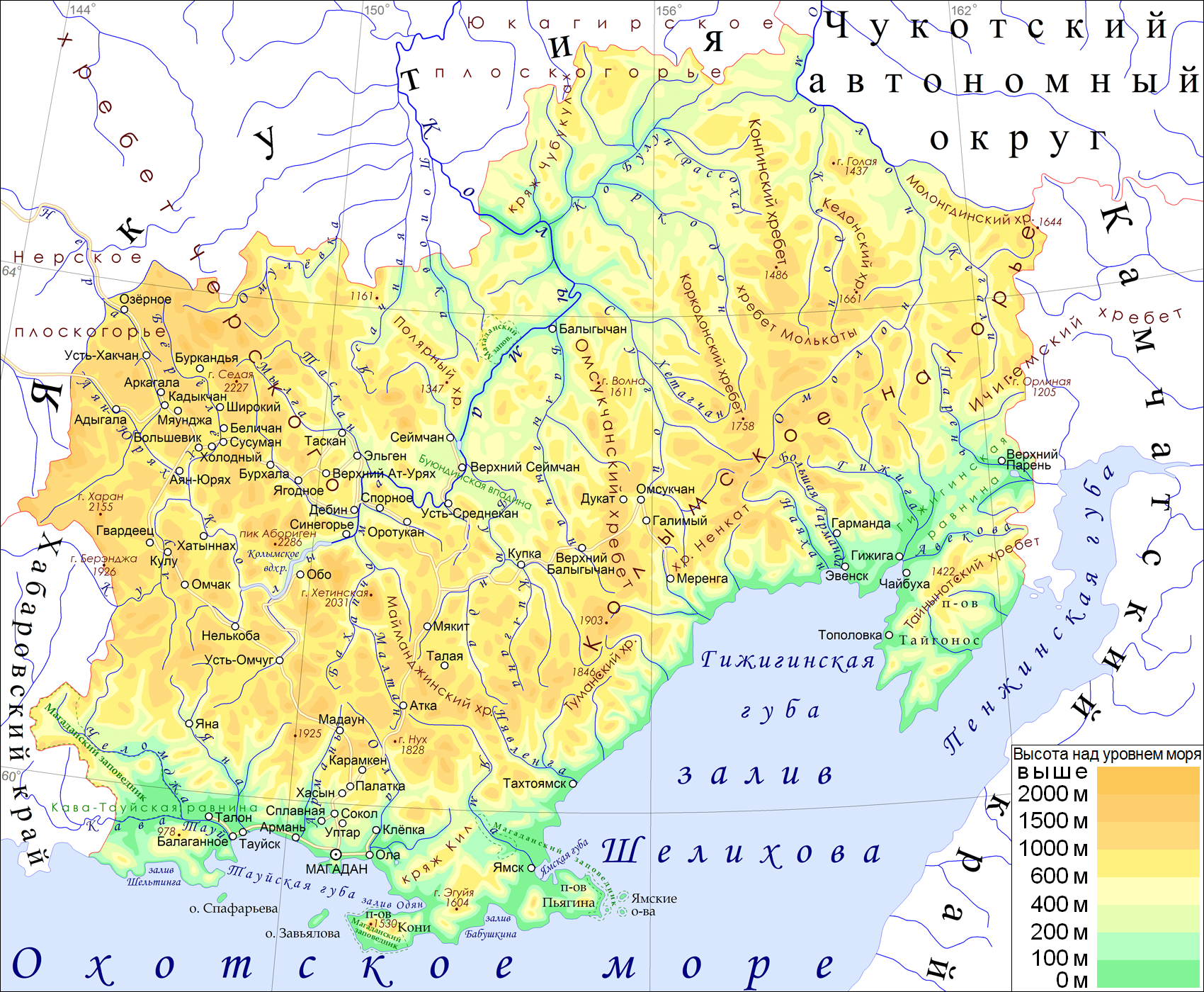
Magadan Oblast

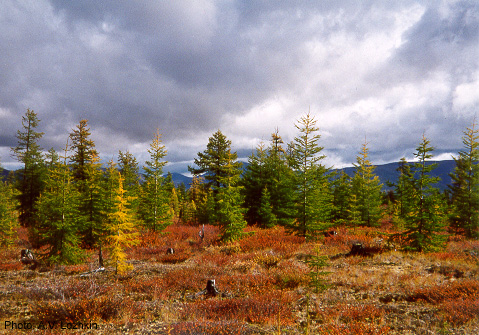
Larch forest in the Upper Kolyma Highlands

Kolyma (Russian: Колыма́, IPA: [kəɫɨˈma]) or Kolyma Krai (Колымский край) is a historical region in the Russian Far East that includes the basin of Kolyma River and the northern shores of the Sea of Okhotsk, as well as the Kolyma Mountains (the watershed of the two). It is bounded to the north by the East Siberian Sea and the Arctic Ocean, and by the Sea of Okhotsk to the south. Kolyma Krai was never formally defined and over time it was split among various administrative units. As of 2023, it consists roughly of the Magadan Oblast, north-eastern areas of Yakutia, and the Bilibinsky District of Chukotka Autonomous Okrug.

The area, part of which is within the Arctic Circle, has a subarctic climate with very cold winters lasting up to six months of the year. Permafrost and tundra cover a large part of the region. Average winter temperatures range from −19 to −38 °C (−2 to −36 °F) (even lower in the interior), and average summer temperatures, from 3 to 16 °C (37 to 61 °F). There are rich reserves of gold, silver, tin, tungsten, mercury, copper, antimony, coal, oil, and peat. Twenty-nine zones of possible oil and gas accumulation have been identified in the Sea of Okhotsk shelf. Total reserves are estimated at 3.5 billion tons of equivalent fuel, including 1.2 billion tons of oil and 1.5 billion m^{3} of gas.

The principal town Magadan has nearly 100,000 inhabitants and is the largest port in north-eastern Siberia. It has a large fishing fleet and remains open year-round because of icebreakers. Magadan is served by the nearby Sokol Airport. There are many public and private farming enterprises. Gold mines, pasta and sausage factories, fishing companies, and a distillery form the city's industrial base.

== Prehistory ==
During archaeological investigations of Paleolithic sites on the Angara, in 1936 the unique Stone Age site of Buret’ was discovered which yielded an anthropomorphic sculpture, skulls of rhinoceroses, and surface and semisubterranean dwellings. The houses were analogous, on one hand, to Paleolithic European houses and, on the other, to ethnographically studied houses of the Eskimos, Chukchi and Koryaks.

The indigenous peoples of this region include the Evens, Koryaks, Yakuts, Chukchis, Chuvans, Yukaghirs and Itelmens, who traditionally lived from fishing along the Sea of Okhotsk coast or from reindeer herding in the River Kolyma valley.

== History ==
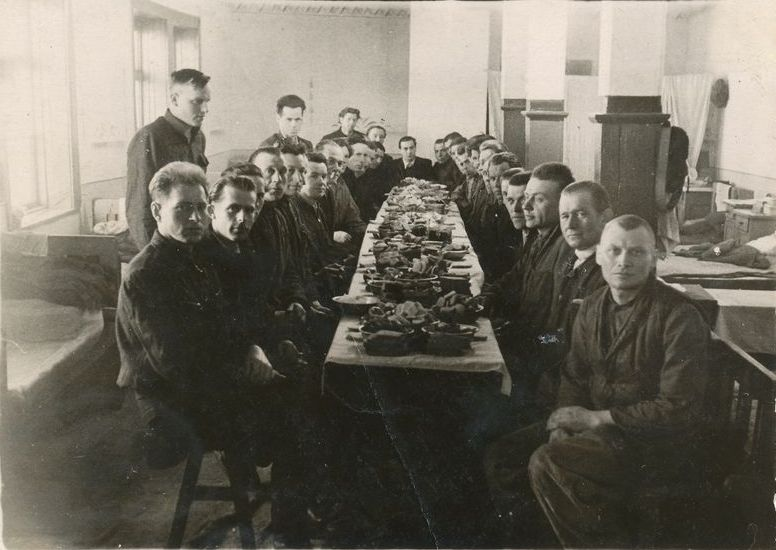
Lithuanian political prisoners at the Christmas Eve table in the Kolyma region, 1955

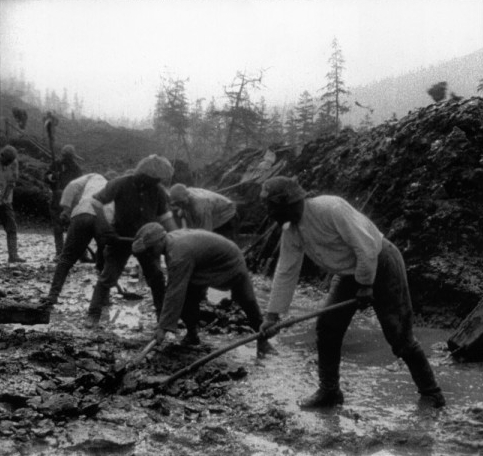
Construction of the bridge through the Kolyma by the workers of the Dalstroy (part of the 'Road of Bones' from Magadan to Jakutsk), 1930s

During Joseph Stalin's times, tens of thousands inmates died en route to the area or in the Kolyma's series of gold mining, road building, lumbering, and construction camps between 1932 and 1954. It was Kolyma's reputation that caused Aleksandr Solzhenitsyn, author of The Gulag Archipelago, to characterize it as the "pole of cold and cruelty" in the Gulag system.

The Mask of Sorrow monument in Magadan commemorates all those who died in the Kolyma forced-labour camps and the recently dedicated Church of the Nativity remembers the victims in its icons and Stations of the Camps.

=== Emergence of the Gulag camps ===
Gold and platinum were discovered in the region in the early 20th century. During the time of the USSR's industrialization (beginning with Joseph Stalin's first five-year plan, 1928–1932) the need for capital to finance economic development was great. The abundant gold resources of the area seemed tailor-made to provide this capital. A government agency Dalstroy (Дальстрой, acronym for Far North Construction Trust) was formed to organize the exploitation of the area. Prisoners were being drawn into the Soviet penal system in large numbers during the initial period of Kolyma's development, most notably from the so-called anti-Kulak campaign and the government's internal war to force collectivization on the USSR's peasantry. These prisoners formed a readily available workforce.

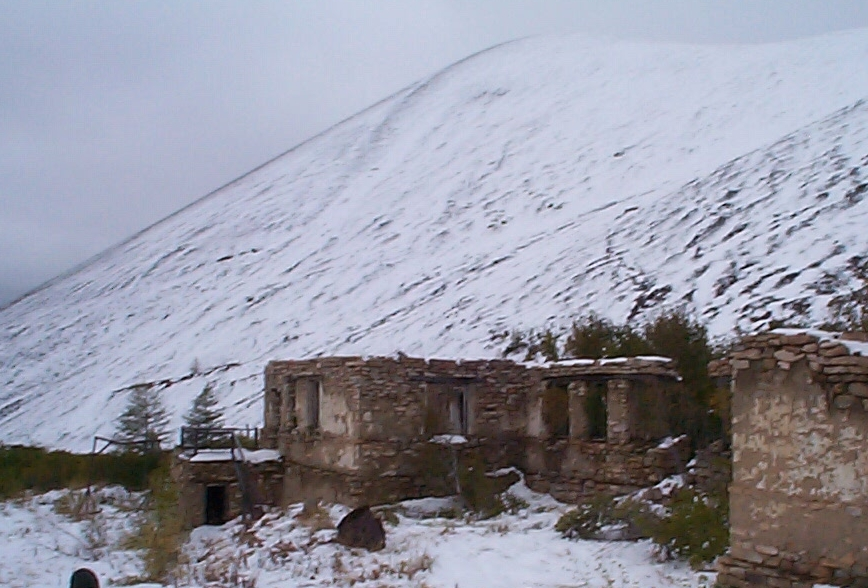
Butugychag Tin Mine – a Gulag camp in the Kolyma area

The initial efforts to develop the region began in 1932, with the building of the town of Magadan by forced labor. (Many projects in the USSR were already using forced labor, most notably the White Sea–Baltic Canal.) After a gruelling train ride in unheated boxcars on the Trans-Siberian Railway, prisoners were disembarked at one of several transit camps (such as Nakhodka and later Vanino) and transported across the Sea of Okhotsk to the natural harbor chosen for Magadan's construction. Conditions aboard the ships were harsh. According to a 1987 article in Time magazine: "During the 1930s the only way to reach Magadan was by ship from Khabarovsk, which created an island psychology and the term Gulag archipelago. Within the crowded prison ships thousands died during transportation. One survivor's memoir recounts that the prison ship SS Dzhurma was caught in the autumn ice in 1933 while trying to get to the mouth of the Kolyma River. When it reached port the following spring, it carried only crew and guards. All 12,000 prisoners were missing, left dead on the ice." It turns out that this incident, widely reported since it was first mentioned in a book published in 1947, could not have happened as the ship Dzhurma was not in Soviet hands until mid 1935.

The trademark for industrial goods produced by the Gulag system

In 1932 expeditions pushed their way into the interior of the Kolyma, embarking on the construction of the Kolyma Highway, which was to become known as the Road of Bones. Eventually, about 80 different camps dotted the region of the uninhabited taiga.

The original director of the Kolyma camps was Eduard Berzin, a Cheka officer. Berzin was later removed (1937) and shot during the period of the Great Purges in the USSR.

==== The Arctic camps ====
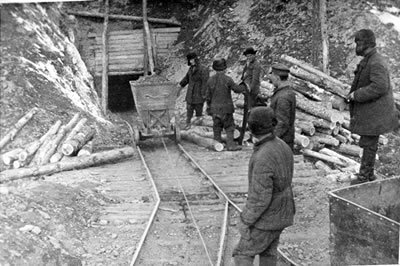
Prisoners at a Kolyma gold mine

At the height of the Purges, around 1937, Aleksandr Solzhenitsyn's account imagines camp commander Naftaly Frenkel as establishing the new law of the Archipelago: "We have to squeeze everything out of a prisoner in the first three months—after that we don't need him anymore." But there is no documentary evidence of this beyond Solzhenitsyn's speculation. The system of hard labor and minimal or no food reduced most prisoners to helpless "goners" (dokhodyaga, in Russian). Conditions varied depending on the state of the country.

Many of the prisoners in Kolyma were academics or intellectuals. They included Mikhail Kravchuk (Krawtschuk), a Ukrainian mathematician who by the early 1930s had received considerable acclaim in the West. After a summary trial, apparently for reluctance to take part in the accusations of some of his colleagues, he was sent to Kolyma where he died in 1942. Hard work in the labor camp, harsh climate and meager food, poor health as well as accusations and abandonment by most of his colleagues, took their toll. Kravchuk perished in Magadan in Eastern Siberia, about 4,000 miles (6,000 km) from the place where he was born. Kravchuk's last article had appeared soon after his arrest in 1938. However, after this publication, Kravchuk's name was stricken from books and journals.

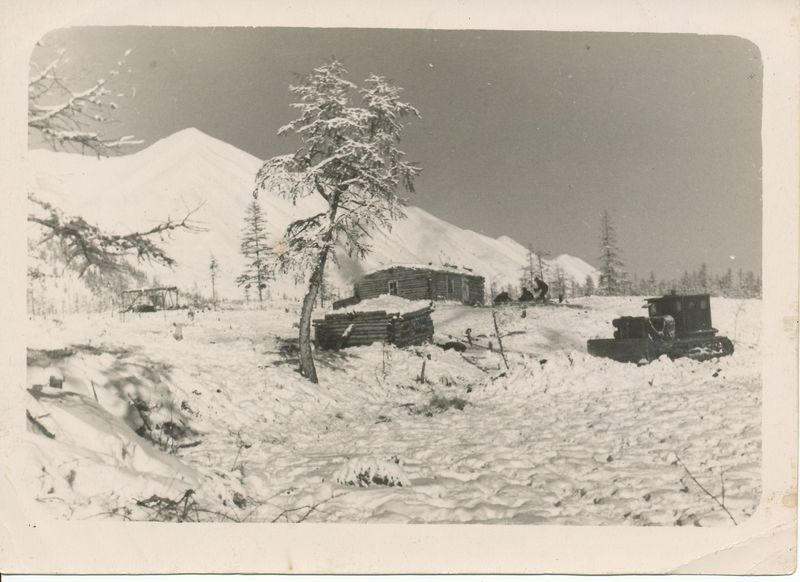
A Lithuanian deportee house in the Kolyma region, 1958

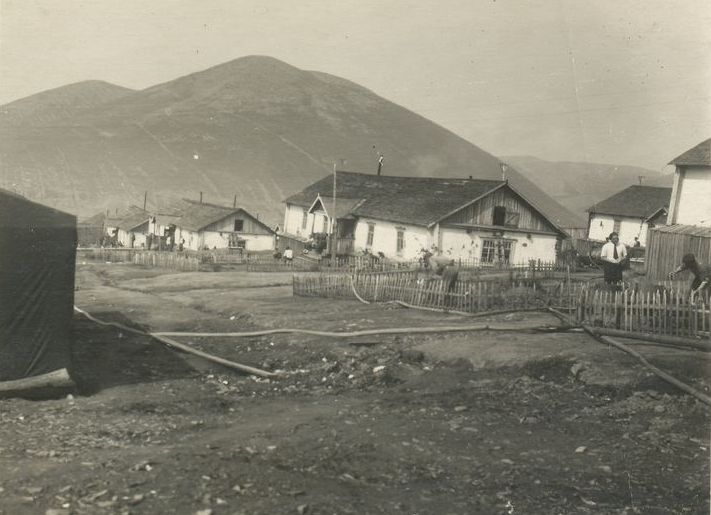
Deportee settlement in the upper Kolyma region, 1956

The prisoner population of Kolyma increased substantially in 1946 with the arrival of thousands of former Soviet POWs liberated by Western Allied forces or the Red Army at the close of World War II. Those judged guilty of collaboration with the enemy frequently received ten or twenty-five year prison sentences to the gulag, including Kolyma.

There were, however, some exceptions. Rumor suggested that Soviet agents seized Léon Theremin, an inventor, in the United States and forced him to return to the Soviet Union; he actually returned voluntarily. Joseph Stalin had Theremin imprisoned at the Butyrka in Moscow; he later came to work in the Kolyma gold mines. Although rumors of his execution circulated widely, Theremin was, in fact, put to work in a sharashka (a secret research-laboratory), together with other scientists and engineers, including aircraft designer Andrei Tupolev and rocket scientist Sergei Korolyov (also a Kolyma inmate). The Soviet Union rehabilitated Theremin in 1956.

The Kolyma camps switched to using (mostly) free labor after 1954, and in 1956 Nikita Khrushchev ordered a general amnesty that freed many prisoners. Various estimates have put the Kolyma death-toll from 1930 to the mid-1950s between 250,000 and over a million people.

==== Dalstroy officials ====
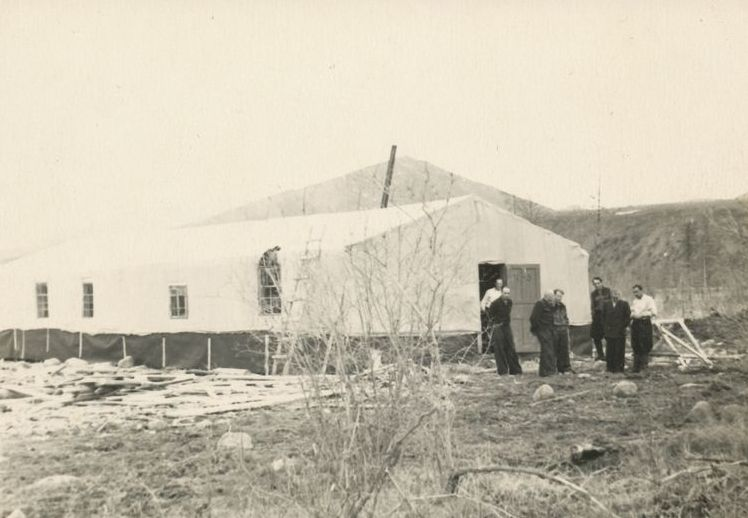
Deportee barrack in the Kolyma region, 1957

Dalstroy was the agency created to manage exploitation of the Kolyma area, based principally on the use of forced labour.

In the words of Azerbaijani prisoner Ayyub Baghirov, "The entire administration of the Dalstroy—economic, administrative, physical and political—was in the hands of one person who was invested with many rights and privileges." The officials in charge of Dalstroy, i.e., the Kolyma Gulag camps were:

- Eduard Petrovich Berzin, 1932–1937
- Karp Aleksandrovich Pavlov, 1937–1939.
- Ivan Fedorovich Nikishev, 1940–1948.
- Ivan Grigorevich Petrenko, 1948–1950.
- I.L. Mitrakov, from 1950 until Dalstroy was taken over by the Ministry of Metallurgy on 18 March 1953.

==== Calendar of historical events ====
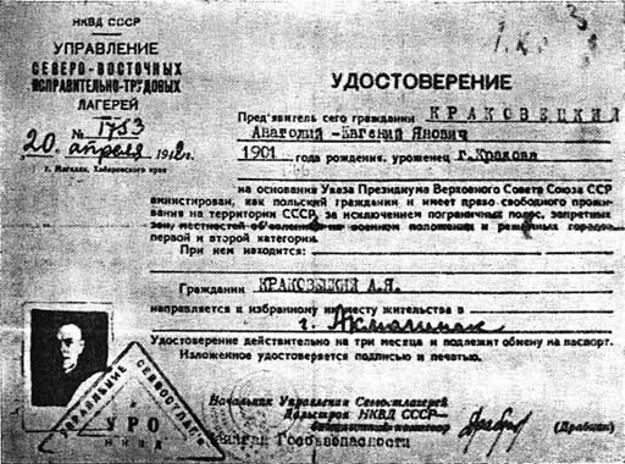
A Sevvostlag-issued identity card of Polish prisoner (journalist and writer Anatol Krakowiecki) released from a Kolyma Gulag camp, spring 1942

Calendar of events:

- 1928–1929: Gold mines established in the Kolyma River region. Commencement of regular mining operations
- 13 November 1931: Establishment of Dalstroy
- 4 February 1932: Eduard Berzin, Manager of Dalstroy, arrives with the first 10 prisoners.
- 1934: The headcount increases to 30,000 inmates.
- 1937: The number of inmates increases to over 70,000; 51,500 kg of gold mined
- June 1937: Stalin reprimands the Kolyma commandants for their undue leniency towards the inmates.
- December 1937: Berzin is charged with espionage and subsequently tried and shot in August 1938.
- 4 March 1938: Dalstroy is put under the jurisdiction of NKVD, USSR.
- December 1938: Osip Mandelstam, an eminent Russian poet, dies in a transit camp en route to Kolyma.
- 1939: Number of inmates now 138,200.
- 11 October 1939: Commandants Pavlov (Dalstroy) and Stepan Garanin (Sevvostlag) sacked from their posts. Garanin subsequently shot.
- 1941: Headcount of inmates reaches 190,000. Also some 3,700 Dalstroy contract workers.
- 23 May 1944: US Vice President Henry A. Wallace arrives for a NKVD-hosted 25-day tour of Magadan, Kolyma, and the Russian Far East.
- October 1945: Camp for the Japanese prisoners of war is established in Magadan, to provide extra labour.
- 1952: 199,726 inmates, the highest ever in the history of the Kolyma camps and Dalstroy.
- May 1952: According to commandant Mitrakov, Sevvoslag is dissolved, Dalstroy transformed into the General Board of Labour Camps
- March 1953: After Stalin's death, Dalstroy transferred to the Ministry of Metallurgy, camp units come under the jurisdiction of the Soviet Ministry of Justice.
- September 1953: Dalstroy camp units taken over by the newly established management board of the North-Eastern Corrective Labour Camps. Harsh camp regime gradually relaxed.
- 1953–1956: Period of mass amnesties and the release of most political prisoners. Some camp closures begin.
- 1957: Dalstroy liquidated. Many of the former prisoners continued to work in the mines with a modified status and a few new prisoners arrived, at least until the early 1970s.

=== Post-Dalstroy developments ===
The Chukot Autonomous Okrug site provides details of developments after the official closure of the camps. In 1953, the Magadan Oblast (or region) was established. Dalstroy was transferred to the jurisdiction of the Ministry of Metallurgy and later to the Ministry of Non-Ferrous Metallurgy.

==== Industrial and economic evolution ====
Industrial gold-mining started in 1958 leading to the development of mining settlements, industrial enterprises, power plants, hydro-electric dams, power transmission lines and improved roads. By the 1960s, the region's population exceeded 100,000. With the dissolution of Dalstroy, the Soviets adopted new labor policies. While the prison labor was still important, it mainly consisted of common criminals. New manpower was recruited from all Soviet nationalities on a voluntary basis, to make up for the sudden lack of political prisoners. Young men and women were lured to the frontier land of Kolyma with the promise of high earnings and better living. But many decided to leave. The region's prosperity suffered under Soviet liberal policies in the end of the 1980s and 1990s with a considerable reduction in population, apparently by 40% in Magadan. A U.S. report from the late 1990s gives details of the region's economic shortfall citing outdated equipment, bankruptcies of local companies and lack of central support. It does however report substantial investments from the United States and the governor's optimism for future prosperity based on revival of the mining industries.

==== Last political prisoners ====
Dalstroy and the camps did not close down completely. The Kolyma authority, which was reorganised in 1958/59 (31 December 1958), finally closed in 1968. However the mining activities did not stop. Indeed, government structures still exist today under the Ministry of Natural Resources. In some cases, the same individuals seem to have stayed on over the years under new management. There are indications that the political prisoners were gradually phased out over the years but it was only as a result of Boris Yeltsin's far reaching reforms in the 1990s that the very last prisoners were released from Kolyma. The Russian author Andrei Amalrik appears to have been one of the last high-profile political prisoners to be sent to Kolyma. In 1970, he published two books: Will the Soviet Union Survive Until 1984? and Involuntary Journey to Siberia. As a result, he was arrested for "defaming the Soviet state" in November 1970 and sentenced to hard labour, apparently in Kolyma, for what turned out to be a total of almost five years.

== Accounts of the Kolyma Gulag camps ==
=== Varlam Shalamov ===
A detailed description of conditions in the camps is provided by Varlam Shalamov in his Kolyma Tales. In Dry Rations he writes: "Each time they brought in the soup... it made us all want to cry. We were ready to cry for fear that the soup would be thin. And when a miracle occurred and the soup was thick we couldn't believe it and ate it as slowly as possible. But even with thick soup in a warm stomach there remained a sucking pain; we'd been hungry for too long. All human emotions—love, friendship, envy, concern for one's fellow man, compassion, longing for fame, honesty—had left us with the flesh that had melted from our bodies...."

=== Michael M. Solomon ===
During and after the Second World War the region saw major influxes of Ukrainian, Polish, German, Japanese, and Korean prisoners. There is a particularly memorable account written by a Jewish Romanian survivor, Michael M. Solomon, in his book Magadan (see Bibliography below) which gives us a vivid picture of both the transit camps leading to the Kolyma and the region itself. Hungarian George Bien, author of the Lost Years, also recounts the horrors of Kolyma. His story has also led to a film.

=== Vladimir Nikolayevich Petrov ===
Soviet Gold, the first autobiographical book written by Vladimir Nikolayevich Petrov, is almost entirely a description of the author's life in Magadan and the Kolyma gold fields.

=== Ayyub Baghirov ===
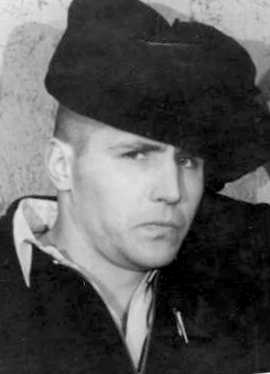
Vytautas Mačiuika, Lithuanian political prisoner in Kolyma, 1955

In Bitter Days of Kolyma, Ayyub Baghirov, an Azerbaijani accountant who was finally rehabilitated, provides details of his arrest, torture and sentencing to eight (finally to become 18) years imprisonment in a labour camp for refusing to incriminate a fellow official for financial irregularities. Describing the train journey to Siberia, he writes: "The terrible heat, the lack of fresh air, the unbearable overcrowded conditions all exhausted us. We were all half starved. Some of the elderly prisoners, who had become so weak and emaciated, died along the way. Their corpses were left abandoned alongside the railroad tracks."

=== Brother Gene Thompson ===
A vivid account of the conditions in Kolyma is that of Brother Gene Thompson of Kiev's Faith Mission. He recounts how he met Vyacheslav Palman, a prisoner who survived because he knew how to grow cabbages. Palman spoke of how guards read out the names of those to be shot every evening. On one occasion a group of 169 men were shot and thrown into a pit. Their fully clothed bodies were found after the ice melted in 1998.

=== Vadim Kozin ===
One of the most famous political prisoners in Kolyma was Vadim Kozin, possibly Russia's most popular romantic tenor, who was sent to the camps in February 1945, apparently for refusing to write a song about Stalin. Although he was initially freed in 1950 and could return to his singing career, he was soon framed by his enemies on charges of homosexuality and sent back to the camps. Though released once again several years later, he was never officially rehabilitated and remained in exile in Magadan where he died in 1994. Speaking to journalists in 1982, he explained how he had been forced to tour the camps: "The Polit bureau formed brigades which would, under surveillance, go on tours of the concentration camps and perform for the prisoners and the guards, including those of the highest rank." In 1993, while being interviewed by Theo Uittenbogaard for the TV documentary Gold – Lost in Siberia , he recalled how he was released from exile temporarily and flown into Yalta for a few hours, because Winston Churchill, unaware of Kozin's forced exile, had asked Stalin for the famous singer Vadim Kozin to perform, during a break in the Yalta Conference, held February 4–11, 1945.

=== Yevgenia Ginzburg ===
In her autobiographical account Journey into the Whirlwind, academic Yevgenia Ginzburg details her persecution, arrest, trial, imprisonment, and exile to Kolyma. The book starts with a 4 a.m. phone call on the first of December 1934 calling for her to attend the regional committee office at 6 a.m. and follows the chain of events that ultimately lead to her exile to Kolyma, arriving in Magadan in the winter of 1939. Part 2 chapters 5 to 9 cover her time in Kolyma, first working on land improvements, and then being sent to the "state farm" of Elgen, sometimes El'gen, Russian Эльген, to fell trees.

"During the 18 years of our ordeal, many times I found myself face to face with death, but it was an experience I never got used to....

To begin with, salvation from death in the Elgen forests came to me from cranberries, sour, bitter northern berries, not ripening at the end of summer as they would do in a normal climate, but remaining from the previous year, to be coaxed out of their hiding place by the timid Kolyma spring, after their ten months' sleep under the snow."

=== Nikolai Getman ===
Finally, Ukrainian prisoner Nikolai Getman who spent the years 1945–1953 in Kolyma, records his testimony in pictures rather than words. But he does have a plea: "Some may say that the Gulag is a forgotten part of history and that we do not need to be reminded. But I have witnessed monstrous crimes. It is not too late to talk about them and reveal them. It is essential to do so. Some have expressed fear on seeing some of my paintings that I might end up in Kolyma again—this time for good. But the people must be reminded... of one of the harshest acts of political repression in the Soviet Union. My paintings may help achieve this." The Jamestown Foundation provides access to all 50 of Getman's paintings together with explanations of their significance.

== Estimating the number of victims ==
In an account of a visit to Magadan by Harry Wu in 1999, there is a reference to the efforts of Alexander Biryukov, a Magadan lawyer to document the terror. He is said to have compiled a book listing every one of the 11,000 people documented to have been shot in Kolyma camps by the state security organ, the NKVD. Biryukov, whose father was in the Gulag at the time he was born, has begun researching the location of graves. He believed some of the bodies were still partially preserved in the permafrost.

It is therefore impossible to provide final figures on the number of victims who died in Kolyma. Robert Conquest, author of The Great Terror, now admits that his original estimate of three million victims was far too high. In his article Death Tolls for the Man-made Megadeaths of the 20th Century, Matthew White estimates the number of those who died at 500,000. In Stalin's Slave Ships, Martin Bollinger undertakes a careful analysis of the number of prisoners who could have been transported by ship to Magadan between 1932 and 1953 (some 900,000) and the probable number of deaths each year (averaging 27%). This produces figures significantly below earlier estimates but, as the author emphasizes, his calculations are by no means definitive. In addition to the number of deaths, the dreadful conditions of the camps and the hardships experienced by the prisoners over the years need to be taken into account. In his review of Bollinger's book, Norman Polmar refers to 130,000 victims who died at Kolyma. As Bollinger reports in his book, the 3,000,000 estimate originated with the CIA in the 1950s and appears to be a flawed estimate.

== Ecology ==
This ecoregion encompasses the drainages of Arctic rivers from the Indigirka River eastward to Chaunskaya Guba Bay. In the west, the Indigirka River drainage is separated from the Khroma River and Yana rivers by the spurs of the Polousnyy Kryazh Range and the Chersky Range.

=== Paleoecology ===
During the Pleistocene the ecology of this part of Beringia was quite different from modern times, with the extinct woolly mammoth and the wooly rhinoceros being present.

The polar bear most likely evolved here.

== See also ==
- Gulag
- Vorkutlag
- Soviet Union
