= Kalima =

Kalima (from Arabic: كلمة, kalimah, "word") may refer to:

- The Six Kalmas, texts to memorize to learn the fundamentals of Islam
- Kalima (band), a Manchester jazz-funk band on Factory Records
  - Kalima!, the second album by Kalima
- Kalima, a Moroccan magazine
- "Kalima", a track by Elvin Jones on his 1978 album Remembrance
- Kalima, an online journal of human rights founded by Sihem Bensedrine and Naziha Réjiba
- Al Kalima, a newspaper published in Libya

Kalima may also refer to:

- Kalima, a commune of Huambo Province, Angola
- Kalima, Democratic Republic of the Congo, a town in Maniema Province in the Democratic Republic of the Congo

== See also ==
- Calima (disambiguation)
- Kali Ma (or Kali-ma), "mother Kali," a name for the Hindu goddess Kālī
- Kolyma (disambiguation)
