= Calima =

Calima may refer to:

== Colombia ==
- Calima culture, pre-Columbian culture from Colombia
- Calima, Valle del Cauca, municipality of Valle del Cauca, Colombia
- Calima River, river in Colombia

== Other ==
- Calima (arachnid), a genus in family Hubbardiidae
- Calima Aviación, a Spanish airline
- Calima, a dust wind originating in the Saharan Air Layer
- CALIMA or The Temple of Semos, a place in Planet of the Apes (2001 film)

== See also ==
- Kalima (disambiguation)
