= Shalamov =

Shalamov (Russian: Шаламов), feminine: Shalamova is a Russian surname. Notable people with the surname include:

- Tikhon Shalamov (1868–1933), Priest of the Russian Orthodox Church
- Varlam Shalamov (1907–1982), Russian writer, journalist and poet
- Vladimir Shalamov (1836–1887), Russian architect
- Yelena Shalamova (born 1982), Russian rhythmic gymnast
- Juri Šalamov (born 1955), Soviet and Estonian football (soccer) coach

== See also ==
- Shamalov
- 3408 Shalamov, minor planet
