= Itzkoff =

Itzkoff is a surname. Notable people with the surname include:

- Dave Itzkoff (born 1976), American journalist
- Seymour Itzkoff (born 1928), American psychologist and writer
