= Kolyma (disambiguation) =

Kolyma is a vast region in Siberia, Russia.

Kolyma may also refer to any of the following:

- Kolyma (river), a river in northeastern Siberia
- Kolyma Bay, one of the main gulfs of the East Siberian Sea
- Kolyma Gulf, the largest gulf of the East Siberian Sea
- Kolyma Lowland, a vast region of marshes and lakes in northeastern Siberia
- Kolyma Hydroelectric Station on the Kolyma River
- Kolyma Reservoir, an artificial lake in Magadan Oblast
- Upper Kolyma District (Verkhnekolymsky Ulus)
- Upper Kolyma Highlands
- Middle Kolyma District (Srednekolymsky Ulus)
- Lower Kolyma District (Nizhnekolymsky Ulus)
- M56 Kolyma Highway, also known as the 'Road of Bones'
- 15267 Kolyma, main-belt minor planet
- Kolyma Mountains, mountain massif in the Kolyma region
- Kolyma Yukaghir, a Yukaghir language spoken primarily in the region
- The Kolyma Tales, Varlam Shalamov's book of short stories of Soviet labour camp life

== See also ==
- Lake Kolima, a big lake in Middle Finland
- Colima (disambiguation)
