= Saharan dust =

Wind-borne mineral dust from the Sahara

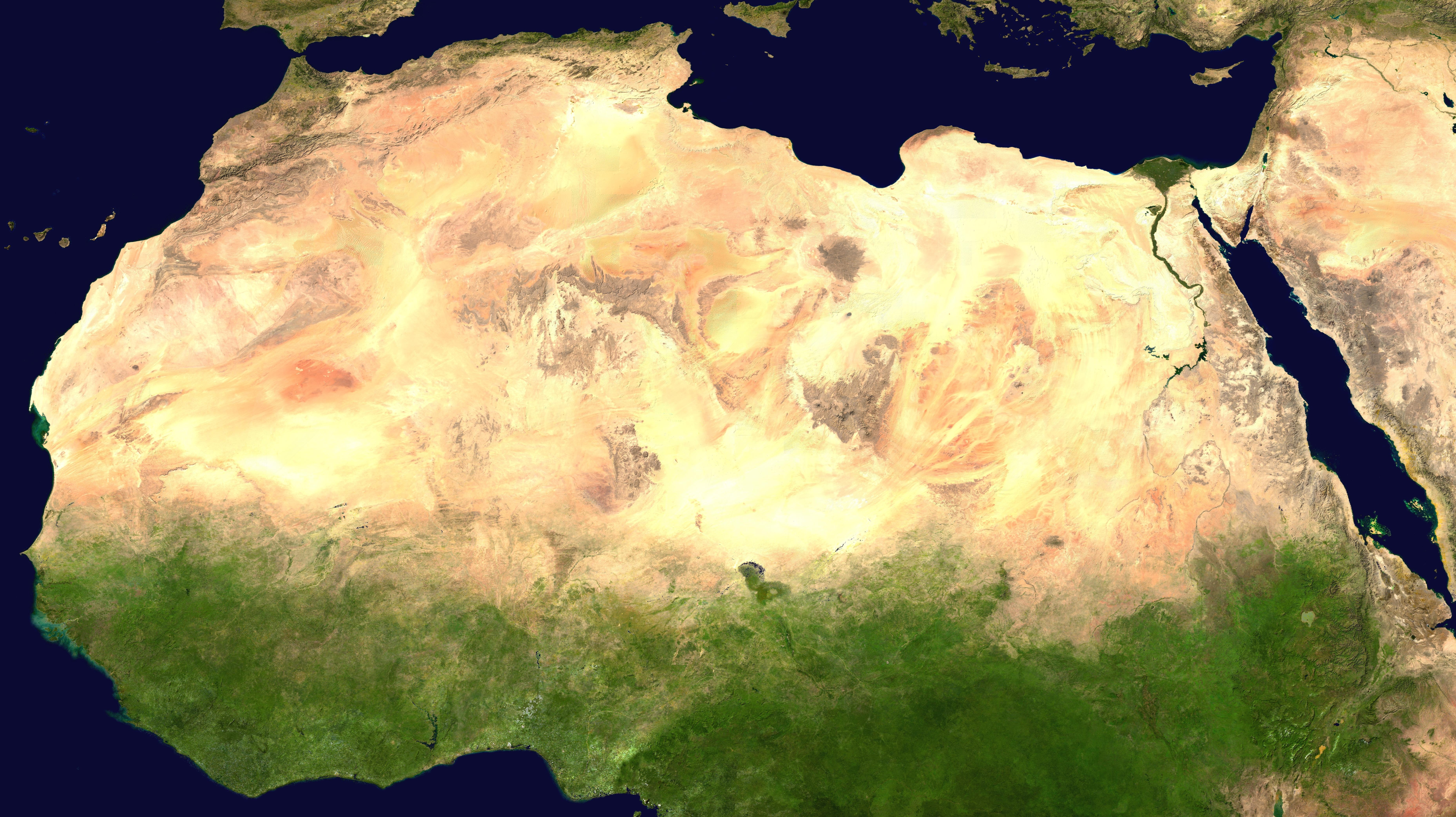
Satellite image of the Sahara, taken by NASA

Saharan dust (also African dust, yellow dust, yellow sand, yellow wind or Sahara dust storms) is an aeolian mineral dust from the Sahara, the largest hot desert in the world. The desert spans slightly more than 9 million square kilometers, from the Atlantic Ocean to the Red Sea, from the Mediterranean Sea to the Niger River valley and the Sudan region in the south.

The Sahara is the largest source of aeolian dust in the world, with annual production rates of approximately 400-700 million tons/year, which is almost half of all aeolian desert inputs to the ocean. Saharan dust is often produced by natural process such as wind storms and doesn't appear to be heavily influenced by human activities.

In most cases marine bacteria and phytoplankton require small amounts of the micronutrient iron, which can be supplied by transport of Saharan dust. The dust delivered to the Atlantic Ocean and the Mediterranean Sea has a small percentage of dissolvable iron; however, since so much iron is supplied to the regions, even with a low soluble percentage, Saharan dust is a large source of iron to these regions. Factors that contribute to dust solubility are particle size, the mineral composition of the dust, the temperature of the water, and its pH. Organic molecules called ligands can also increase the solubility of iron and make it more accessible to organisms to use for primary production. Weathered deposits of Saharan dust are essentially the only source of clay in the Bahama islands that is used by the Lucayan people for making pottery.

Saharan dust has been found to travel to the Amazon basin, Scandinavia, Japan, and other regions. The dust supplied to the North Atlantic and the Mediterranean brings nutrients that help to boost primary production. For the Amazon basin, which is limited in phosphorus in much of the soil in the basin, Saharan dust is a main source of phosphorus. This dust has also affected ecosystems in the southeastern United States and the Caribbean by supplying limiting nutrients, and in some cases promoting soil development on land. Saharan dust has even been found on glaciers and studied to examine atmospheric circulation. Adverse effects of Saharan dust on human health can include respiratory difficulties as well as other adverse health conditions during dust storms in the surrounding regions.

== Properties of Saharan dust ==
=== Physical properties ===
Saharan dust particles from a 2005 dust storm event were analyzed, and their diameter ranged from 100 nanometers (1nanometer= 1 × 10^{−9} meters) to 50 micrometers (1micrometer= 1 × 10^{−6} meters). It appeared that most of the particles were coated in sulfates, with the average coating on the silicate particles 60 nanometers thick. In the atmosphere, particles can act as aerosols, which can deflect sunlight back out into space. The absorption of sunlight increases with smaller particle size. For the reflectivity (albedo) of the particles, all samples varied between 0.945 and 0.955. Values close to 1 indicate that these particles are highly reflective. The size of Saharan dust particles is largely determined by the distance from their source. The first particles to leave the atmosphere and return to the surface will be the largest and coarsest particles. As the particles travel farther, more of the smaller particles will remain.

=== Chemical properties ===
In samples of Saharan dust from 2005, the average composition (by volume) of the dust particles was: 64% silicates, 14% sulfates, 6% quartz, 5% high calcium particles, 1% iron rich (hematite), 1% soot, and 9% other carbon rich particles (carbonaceous material). These samples found 17 different elements in the dust particles, which included (but were not limited to) sodium (Na), manganese (Mn), aluminum (Al), silicon (Si), iron (Fe), cobalt (Co), copper (Cu), potassium (K), and calcium (Ca).

The dust supplied from the Sahara to the subtropical North Atlantic contains a large amount of iron compared with other sources of dust to the ocean. It also contains aluminum, which is not needed for primary production, but can be used as a marker of the dust's source.

Dust from the Sahara also supplies phosphorus and silica to surface waters. Dust has also been shown to carry sulfur; however, this is not well understood.

=== Biological properties ===
Saharan dust provides marine ecosystems with important nutrients. Iron is a necessary micronutrient for photosynthesis in marine primary producers such as phytoplankton. In parts of the Atlantic, dissolved iron is thought to limit the amount of photosynthesis that phytoplankton can carry out. In most of the dust brought to the ocean's surface, the iron is not soluble, and organisms require an organic molecule called a ligand to help dissolve the iron so that organisms can use it for photosynthesis.

Microorganisms living on particles can be transported away from their original habitat when dust is picked up and blown away. Sometimes, these organisms survive, and can grow where the dust has landed, effecting local ecosystems. One example is Mont Blanc in the Alps, bordering France, Italy, and Switzerland, where snow-colonizing bacteria was found on dust particles. There have also been studies where bacteria from Saharan dust caused sickness in corals in the Caribbean.

== Solubility and bioavailability ==
=== Factors impacting Saharan dust dissolution & iron solubility ===
While Saharan dust delivers a large amount of iron to the Atlantic Ocean and the Mediterranean Sea, only a small amount of that iron (~0.4 - 0.5%) is soluble in water. The solubility of Saharan dust in the world's oceans and the iron it delivers depend on a variety of factors, including particle size, mineral composition, temperature, pH, and the presence or absence of organic matter.

==== Particle size ====
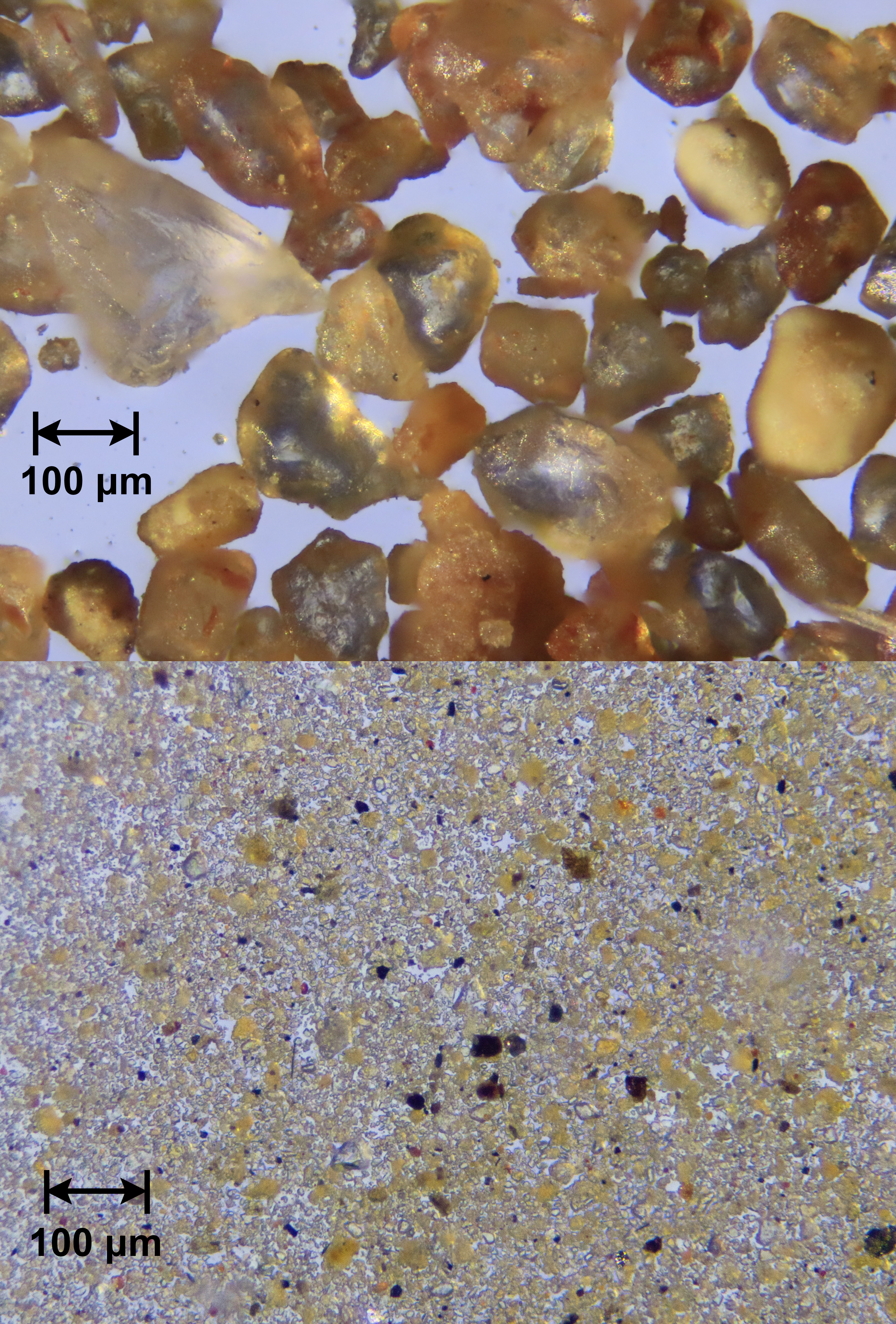
Sahara sand and Sahara dust depicted on the same scale

Saharan dust transported over long distances is primarily composed of very small particles called aerosols. Smaller particles have a larger surface area per unit of mass than larger particles. Once Saharan dust settles into a body of water, the larger surface area increases the contact the dust has with surrounding water, and causes it to dissolve faster than larger particles would. This effect is described by a variant of the Kelvin Equation.

==== Mineral composition ====
Minerals in aerosolized dust are typically modified in the atmosphere to be more soluble than material in soils. Some processes known to modify iron to more soluble forms in the atmosphere are acidic reactions and photochemistry. Iron-containing minerals such as clays, feldspars, and iron oxides are commonly found in Saharan dust. Clays in Saharan dust tend to show higher fractional solubility than iron oxides. Changes in the relative amounts of these minerals and other forms of iron in Saharan dust can alter the amount of the dust that will dissolve.

==== Temperature and pH ====
The solubility of many salts and minerals increases with temperature. As a result, Saharan dust is typically more soluble in regions with higher temperatures.

Determination of the solubility of metal-containing materials is helped by pH. At low pH (acidic conditions), iron is typically more soluble than it is at higher pH (basic conditions). This pH effect has been directly observed with Saharan dust iron solubility, as the dust tends to be more soluble in acidic aerosols and rainwater than it is in the more basic surface ocean. This makes wet deposition containing Saharan dust an important delivery mechanism for soluble iron to the Mediterranean and the Atlantic.

==== Organic stabilization of aerosolized and dissolved iron ====
Free aqueous iron is not very stable in non-acidic conditions; it is inclined to oxidize, form an iron oxide, and precipitate out of solution. Some types of organic matter can help stabilize iron by binding to the iron and preventing the formation of relatively insoluble iron oxides. These organic molecules are called ligands. Different functional groups and heteroatoms in organic molecules contribute differently to the molecules iron-binding activity. Heteroatoms such as oxygen (O), sulfur (S), and nitrogen (N) can increase an organic molecule's iron-binding capacity; the presence of organic matter containing O and/or S and/or N can increase the solubility of iron contained in aerosols. Carboxyl groups in particular have been noted for increasing ligand-like activity of organic matter in aerosols. Other functional groups known to contribute to ligand-like properties in aerosols include ethers, esters, and amines. Aerosols containing more of these ligands have higher percentages of soluble iron than aerosols that have less or no ligands. Saharan dust aerosols contain lower amounts of these ligands, which contributes to the low solubility of iron from Saharan dust. Saharan aerosol organic matter tends to contain more carbohydrate-like material, which does not tend to have strong ligand activity.

Ligands in the surface ocean are varied in molecular structure and include compound classes such as porphyrins and siderophores. These molecules are generally produced by marine bacteria or phytoplankton to obtain metals in regions where metal concentrations are low. Other ligands in the ocean are produced as organic matter breaks down to form humic acids. These humic acids, as well as oxalate, malonate, and tartrate, have been shown to specifically increase the solubility of iron contained in Saharan dust.

=== Bioavailability of Saharan dust-derived iron ===
Generally, marine bacteria and phytoplankton require some form of dissolved iron to meet their iron needs. Saharan dust delivers a large amount of iron to the oceans, but most of this iron is insoluble. Therefore, it can generally be stated that factors that increase the solubility of Saharan dust (small particle sizes, clay-like mineral composition, higher temperatures, lower pH, presence of organic ligands) subsequently increase the bioavailability of iron to these organisms. However, the concept of bioavailability is more nuanced than this statement implies.

Organismal preferences for different forms of iron can be complex. In a study comparing two distinct bacterioplankton communities and their uptake of iron bound to different ligands, the two communities were found to use different forms of bound iron. In this study, organisms from an area with abundant iron seemed to prefer iron bound to ligands such as phaeophytin, but not ligands such as pheophorbide (though both are porphyrin-like ligands), while organisms from an iron-depleted region preferred inorganic unbound iron or iron bound to chlorin e_{6} (another porphyrin-like molecule). In other cases, organisms have been documented to produce organic molecules which increase the bioavailability of iron as an iron-acquisition strategy. Other organisms, when subjected to grazing pressure, produce ligands which decrease the bioavailability of iron to themselves and other species of phytoplankton. The bioavailability of Saharan dust-derived iron, therefore, depends on the kinds of organisms present to use that iron and the form of iron available in solution.

== Saharan dust trajectory ==
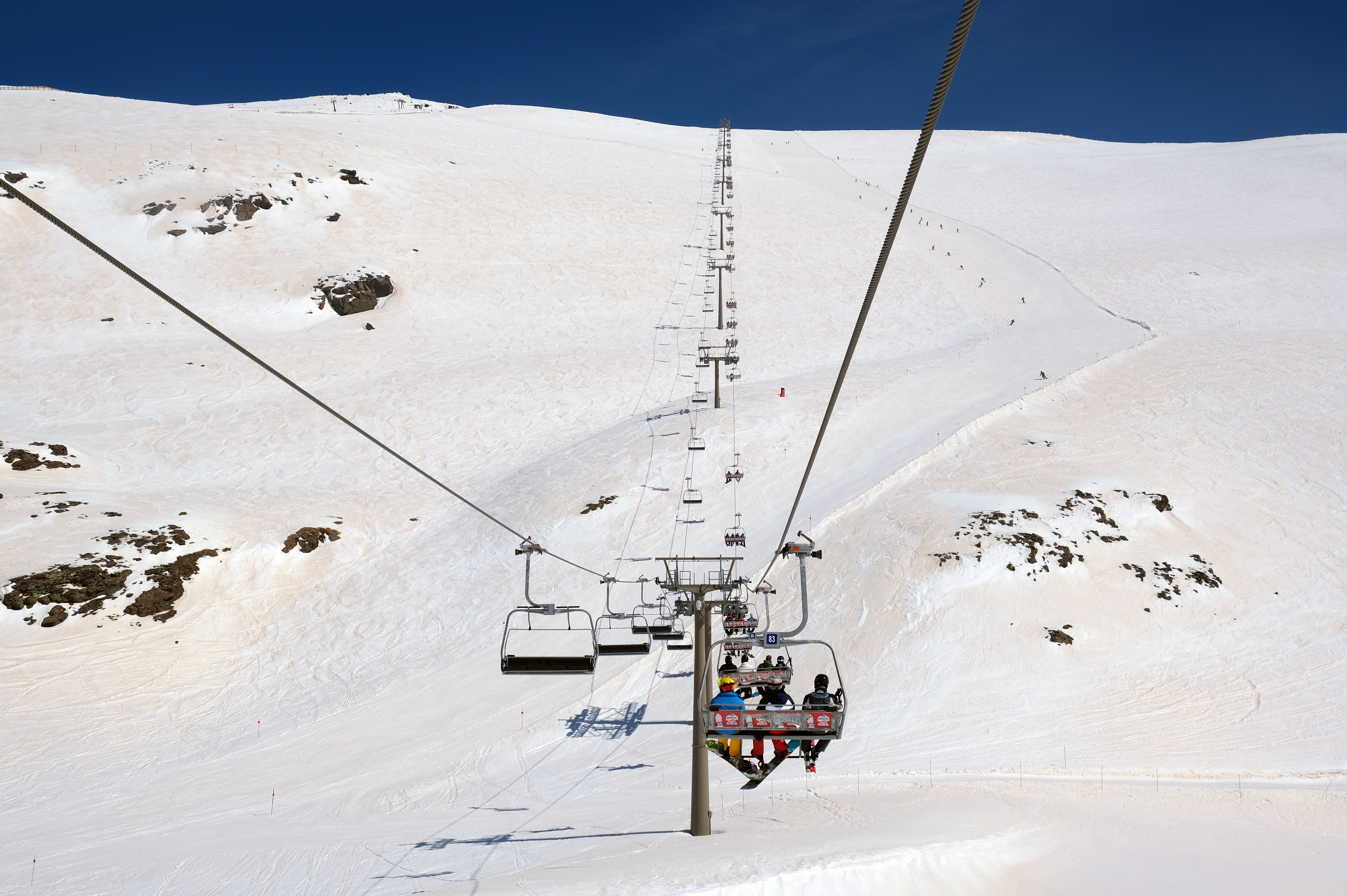
Saharan dust has coloured the snow in Sierra Nevada, Spain.

The meteorology in the Sahara is affected by the Sahel climate. This meteorology condition will determine the direction, speed, altitude, trajectory, distance travel, and duration of Saharan dust in the surrounding regions. The trajectory of Saharan Dust is measured by the visibility of Saharan Dust plume that can be detected by forecasters. Scientists monitor the plume using data from several satellites, such as GOES-16, NOAA-20, and the NOAA/NASA Suomi-NPP, where others use in-situ monitoring such as Aerosol Robotic NETwork (AERONET) and radiometric measurements such as Terra Multi-angle Imaging Spectro-Radiometer (MISR), Cloud‐Aerosol Lidar, and Infrared Pathfinder Satellite Observation (CALIPSO) with Eulerian and Lagrangian approach. Since the 2000s, The Hybrid Single-Particle Lagrangian Integrated Trajectory model (HYSPLIT) can be used to track the back trajectory of air masses, dust dispersion and deposition.

Saharan dust can travel over large distances through the troposphere. The trajectory of Saharan dust is divided into three categories. The westward trajectory, also known as transatlantic transport, reaches the Gulf of Guinea, the Caribbean, the United States of America, and South America. The northward trajectory is toward the Mediterranean and southern Europe and can sometimes extend farther north to Scandinavia. The last one is the eastward trajectory to the eastern Mediterranean and the Middle East. Furthermore, Saharan dust can experience transcontinental transport to Japan via the easterly trajectory where about 50% of the dust particles come from Saharan dust. The estimation of the dust deposition from these trajectories is 170 Tg/yr in the Atlantic, 25 Tg/yr in Mediterranean and 5 Tg/yr in Caribbean.

=== Formation of Saharan dust ===
In order for Saharan dust to impact systems around the globe, it first must become airborne and leave the Sahara. The Bodélé Depression is one of the most significant sites of Saharan dust formation. The depression is composed of dried lake beds now covered by dunes. Winds moving at speeds between 6 and 16 m/s through this region pick up loose sediment, and transport the dust away from the Sahara. Higher wind speeds tend to generate larger dust events in this region. The highest output of dust from this region occurs from spring through fall.

=== The Westward trajectory ===
Saharan dust cloud across the Atlantic Ocean from June 15 to 25, 2020 combines OMPS aerosol index and VIIRS visible imagery from NASA/NOAA's Suomi NPP satellite by Colin Seftor

The westward trajectory is referred as the transatlantic transport, which is the dispersion of Saharan Dust to the west through the Atlantic Ocean. The westward trajectory is the most voluminous, and makes up 30-60% of the total annual Saharan Dust, supplying 60% of the dust to the Gulf of Guinea and 28% to the Atlantic Ocean. This trajectory happens during the northern hemisphere winter and summer. The winter season in the northern hemisphere happens from the end of November until the middle of the March where the westward wind shifts to the northeasterly trade wind (Harmattan season). This trajectory is mostly influenced by the Inter-Tropical Convergence Zone (ITCZ), which links to the monsoon flow and results in the raising of Saharan Dust plume. Due to this convection, this wind brings the dust from the Sahara to the Gulf of Guinea and the resulting dense fog in that surrounding area. Subsequently, in summer, the wind shifts westward, which transports Saharan Dust toward the Atlantic Ocean. The atmospheric layer in this region is the Saharan Air Layer, which is typically dry and hot during this season. This wind brings Sahara Dust to South America and continues to the Amazon Basin. In addition, the peak of this season between July and August brings the dust from the western part of the Sahara directly to the Caribbean islands and the United States of America. Saharan Dust takes about five-to-seven days to reach the Caribbean; however, depending on the climate and the magnitude of Saharan Dust plume, it can be transported further for up to ten days. On June 25, 2020, NASA reported a gigantic Saharan Dust Aerosol Blanket which was called the "Godzilla dust plume" over the Atlantic Ocean, which spread 5,000 miles across the Atlantic Ocean from 15 to 25 June 2020. This was reported as the largest plume over the past 50–60 years period.

=== The Northward trajectory ===
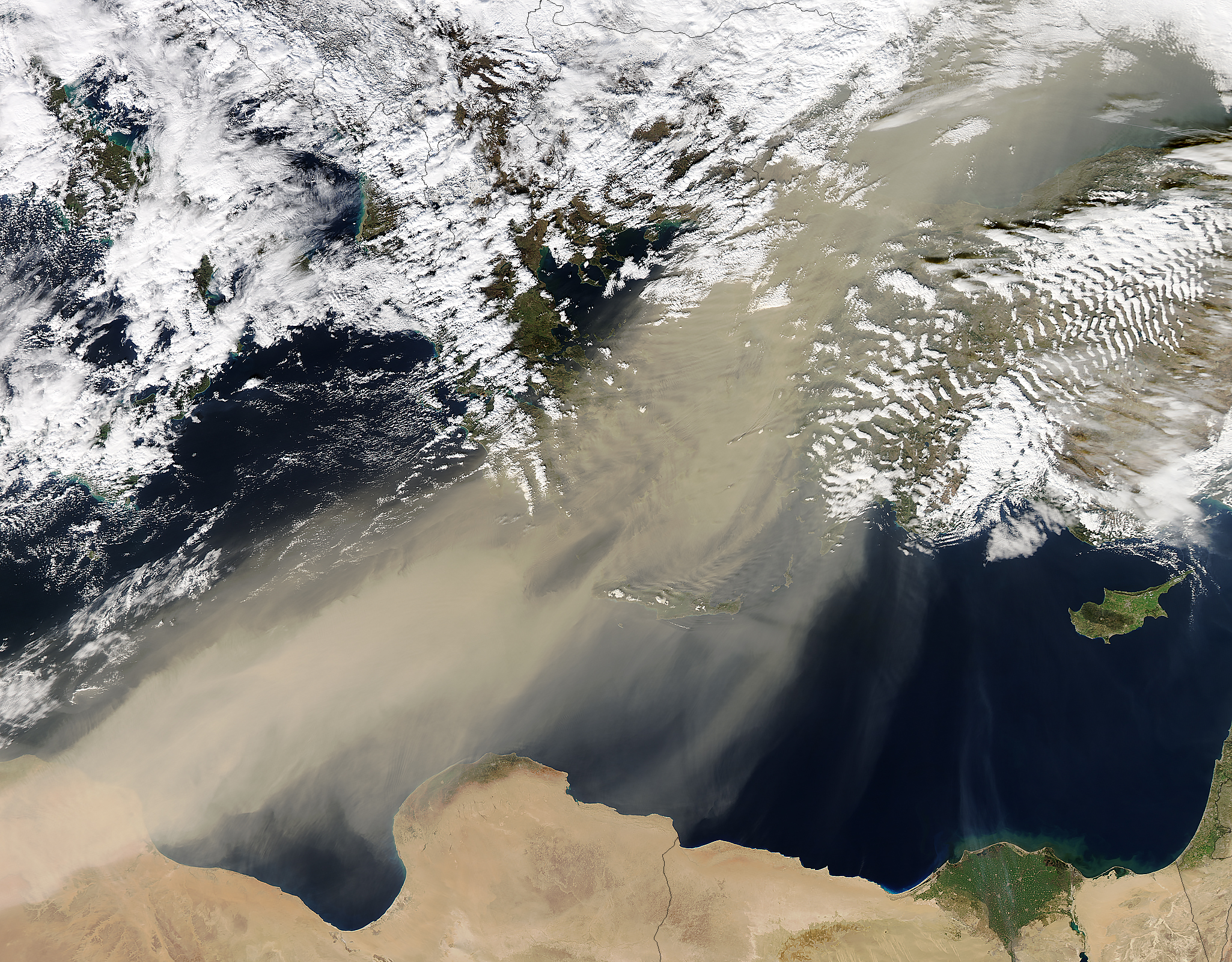
Saharan dust over the Mediterranean Sea on February 1, 2015, by Jeff Schmaltz, LANCE/EOSDIS Rapid Response

The northward trajectory is correlated with the southerly winds that brings Saharan Dust to the Mediterranean Basin and farther to the Southern Europe. This wind is called Sirocco, a southerly wind that originates from the Sahara and commonly occurs during autumn and spring. This trajectory reaches a peak in March and in November, where Saharan Dust can reach up to Southern Europe. However, when rain occurs, the dust will deposit quickly in the Mediterranean basin. Over the year, the least active months of Saharan Dust dispersal for the whole Mediterranean is December.

=== The Eastward trajectory ===
The eastward trajectory originates from the eastern Sahara and expands from the Northward Trajectory. The lifting from the northward trajectory is primarily associated with the occurrence of southerly flow ahead of synoptic frontal systems traveling eastward across the Mediterranean or originating in the northern Sahara and moving northeastward. This event usually happens during Spring and needs two-to-four days to reach the Central Mediterranean and move toward the Middle East.

=== The transcontinental trajectory ===
The transcontinental trajectory refers to the movement of Saharan Dust passing over Asia, where the last point is Japan. The Asian Dust event in Japan is named "Kosa" (means "Yellow Sand" as Aeolian dust in Japanese), and used to be correlated with the dust originating from the arid region of China and Mongolia. However, in March 2003, the Kosa had no correlation with dust even in China and Mongolia. It is reported that the dust came from Saharan Dust and traveled for nine-to-ten days to reach Japan.

== Ocean and land ecosystem effects ==
=== Stimulation of primary production ===
The nutrients that Saharan dust provides to marine ecosystems are important for primary production. Iron is a necessary micronutrient for photosynthesis in marine primary producers such as phytoplankton. In parts of the Atlantic, dissolved iron is thought to limit the amount of photosynthesis that phytoplankton can carry out. In most dust that is brought to the ocean's surface, the iron is not soluble, and organisms require organic molecules called ligands to help make the iron usable for photosynthesis.

One group of primary producers in the Atlantic, is called diazotrophs. Diazotrophs show increased need for the micronutrient iron since they perform nitrogen fixation and the enzyme nitrogenase required for nitrogen fixing contains iron.

=== North Atlantic Ocean circulation ===
The presence of Saharan mineral dust in the Atlantic Ocean can attenuate solar radiation, reducing the amount of shortwave radiation that reaches the sea surface and decreasing the sea surface temperature (SST). This has been shown to account for up to 35% of the inter-annual variability in summer SST over the North Atlantic. A more highly concentrated Saharan Air Layer (SAL) has also been linked with bringing greater precipitation to the northern tropical Atlantic by way of shifting the Intertropical Convergence Zone (ITCZ) north by a few degrees.

With the presence of dust controlling a lot of the variability in SST, major ocean circulation patterns can also be influenced by dust accumulation. Decreased SST can upset the stability of the ocean stratification, leading to enhanced vertical mixing that can in turn influence the behavior of the greater geostrophic flow field. Since Saharan Dust originates on the eastern side of the Atlantic basin, this is where the shortwave radiation flux is reduced the most, hence it is the origin of the largest anomalous ocean conditions. These anomalies slowly advect westward across the basin, leading to basin-scale zonal pressure gradients that further change the basin-wide circulation. These gyre and basin circulation effects happen on the scale of several years - large dust storm events can have effects on the circulation years later.

=== Desert dust across the Mediterranean ===
There are no dust sources in Europe; however, desert dust is occasionally discovered in various areas of Europe. The transport of desert dust in the Mediterranean region depends on the seasonal variation of dust sources from Africa and seasonal changes in atmospheric circulation (see previous Saharan Dust Trajectory section).

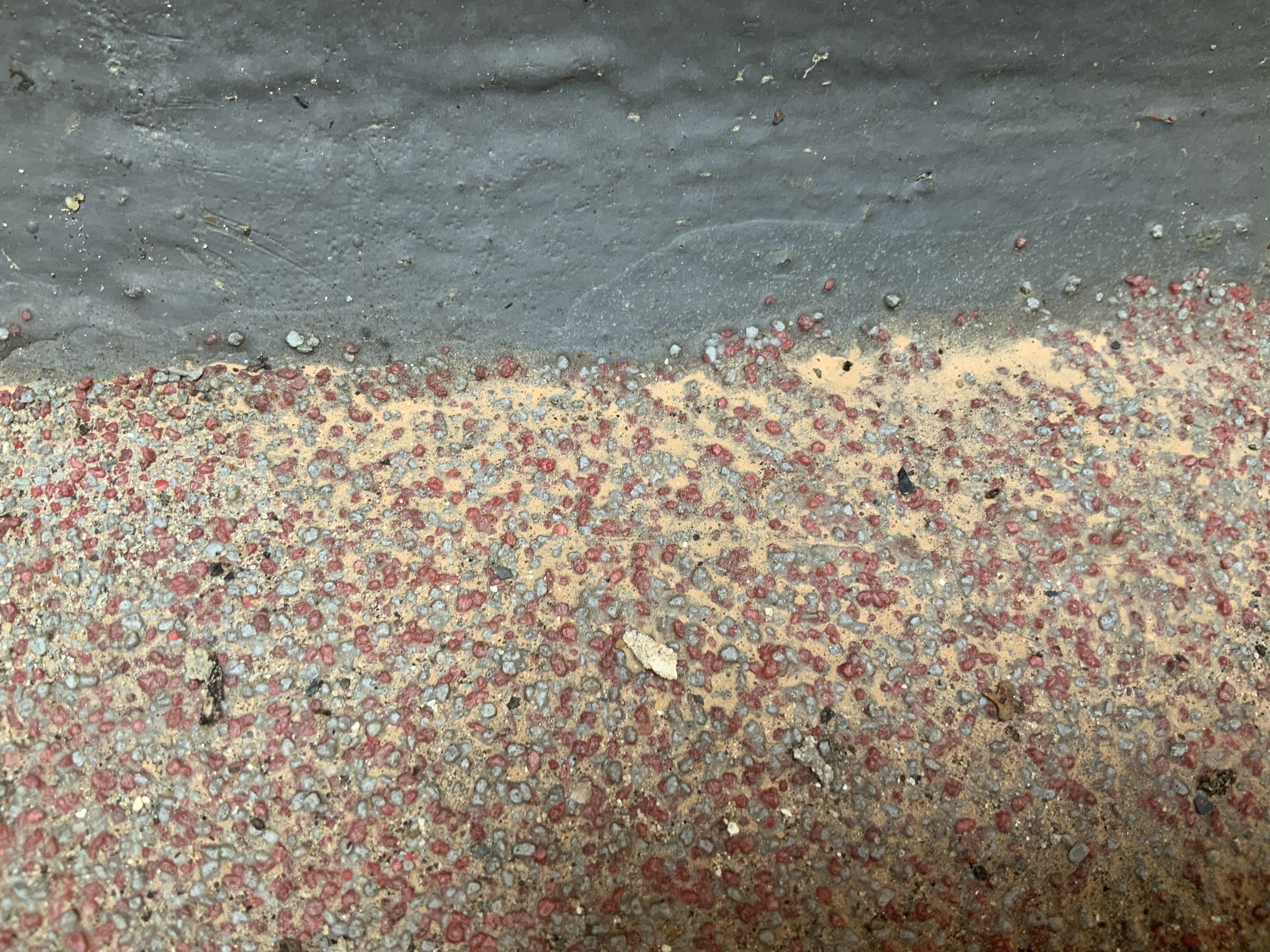
An accumulation of Saharan dust on a rooftop in Cambridge, UK

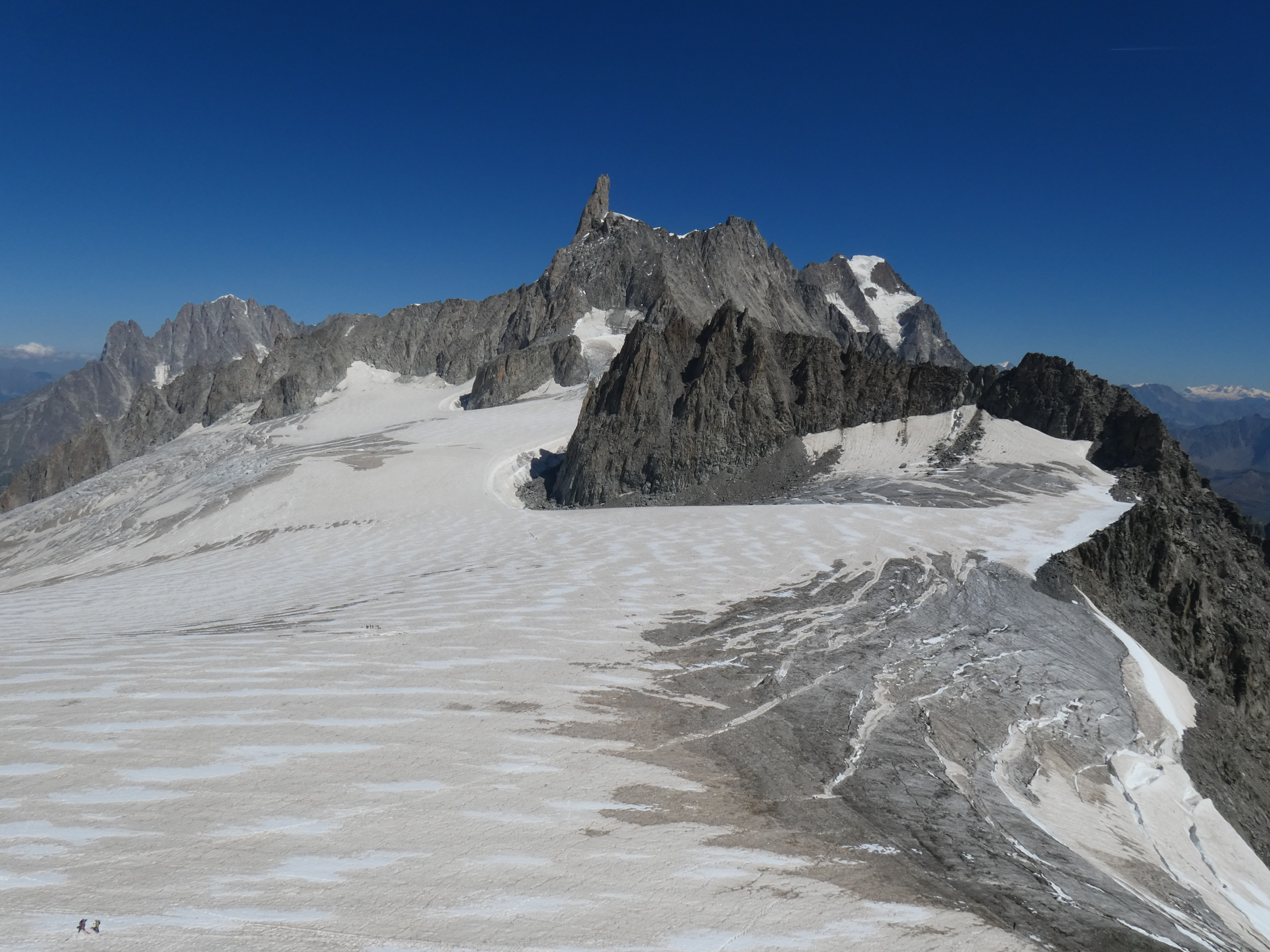
Sahara dust over the snow in the Mont Blanc massif

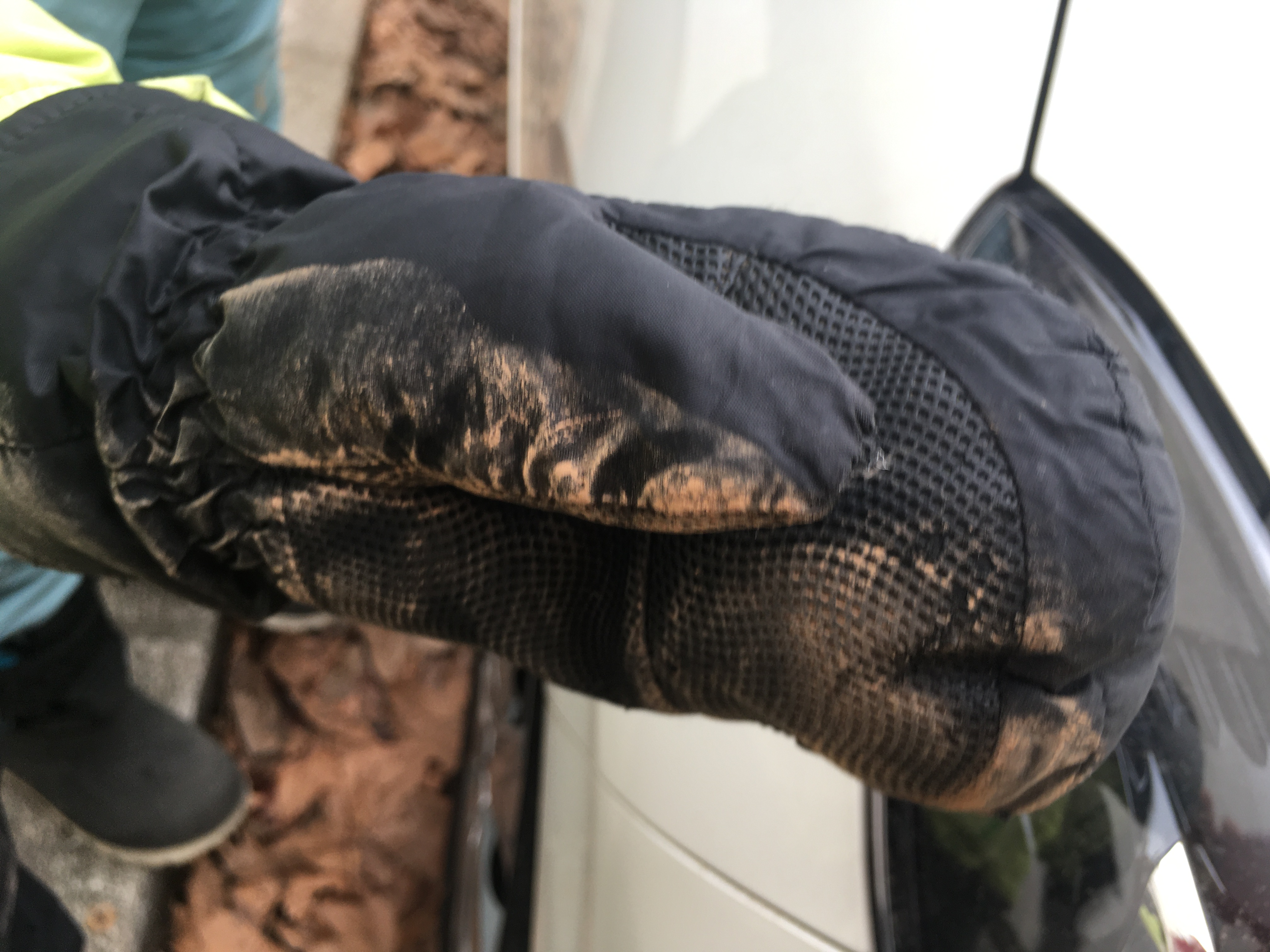
Beige dust on a glove after wiping an outdoor surface in Grenoble

Evidence of dust transport from Africa to northern Italy shows that the composition of the particulate matter changed considerably owing to the significant increase of crustal element concentration, e.g., Al, Si, Ti, K, Fe, and Ca; however, concentrations of anthropogenic elements remain constant. Saharan Dust is a major source of atmospheric aerosol over the North Atlantic and Mediterranean, and is the most important sedimentary contributor to the Mediterranean Basin. These aerosols play a crucial role in supplying macro- and micro- nutrients to its low-nutrient and low-chlorophyll water, enhancing primary production and affecting the bacterioplankton community structure. The Eastern Mediterranean Sea is extremely oligotrophic and is greatly influenced by desert dusts. In the 2000 decade, the increase of temperature and decrease of precipitation at the Eastern Mediterranean Sea cause soil drying, leading to increased dust emission. Due to climate change, this process is expected to continue in the future and contribute more micro- and macro- nutrients into the oligotrophic water.

=== Amazon basin ===
The majority of soil in the Amazon Basin, home of the Amazon rainforest, which accounts for about half of the world's remaining rainforest, is phosphorus deficient. However, studies have found that phosphorus is the dominant fertility factor in the Amazon Basin when it comes to tree growth, so phosphorus deficiency could limit tree growth. Estimated turnover rates of phosphorus within soil in the Amazon Basin compared to deposition rates of phosphorus from Saharan dust indicate that the long-term health and productivity of the Amazon rainforest is dependent on the supply of phosphorus from Saharan dust. While the relative amount of phosphorus deposition from the atmosphere into the Amazon Basin due to Saharan dust is relatively small (roughly 13%) compared to non-dust sources, such as biogenic aerosols and smoke particles, it is comparable to the hydrological loss of phosphorus. Without the deposit of phosphorus from Saharan dust, this hydrological loss could eventually deplete the Amazon Basin of its phosphorus content.

== Dust and climate ==
Saharan dust emissions and transports are sensitive to weather and climate conditions in the source regions. Dense dust clouds reduce the ocean surface exposure to sunlight, hence, reducing the ocean surface heating and therefore influencing the air-sea transfer of water vapor and latent heat, which are critical to climate. When the dust suspends over the Tropical Atlantic, the reduction of heating could contribute to the interhemispheric tropical Atlantic sea-surface temperature anomaly patterns that are related to the Soudano-Sahel drought. Hence, increased dust could lead to longer or more intense drought. In addition, the West African rainfall is well correlated with the frequency and the intensity of the Atlantic hurricanes, suggesting less hurricane activities during dry phases. Some of the dustiest years in Barbados coincide with the El Niño Southern Oscillation (ENSO) events; however, it is still an open question of how global warming will influence dust emissions in the Sahara.

== Transport of microbial communities ==
Saharan dust storms can transport particulate matter that includes different local microorganisms over continental scales, ultimately depositing them where those microorganisms are not natively found. Research shows that significant portions of microbial communities can be transported over large distances in these dust storms. These microbial communities are highly stress-resistant and can contain destructive fungal and bacterial pathogens.

== Adverse health effects ==
While Saharan dust may fertilize the ocean and land, human exposure to this desert dust combined with organic matter can cause potential infections of the lungs. Health effects on other animals also is a concern. Studies have shown that Saharan dust may contain toxic biological allergens and irritants. Within Africa, but up to thousands of kilometers away from the dust source, high Saharan dust concentrations have been correlated to increased cases of asthma, bronchitis, meningitis, and acute respiratory infections.

It is possible that nonbiological compounds in dust also can generate adverse health effects, including respiratory (e.g., asthma, tracheitis, pneumonia, allergic rhinitis and silicosis), cardiovascular (e.g., stroke), and cardiopulmonary diseases. In addition, conjunctivitis, skin irritations, meningococcal disease, and coccidioidomycosis are found to be related to dust storms. For long periods of time, the dust concentration in some areas exceeds several times the maximum levels suggested as safe from the World Health Organization.

The concentration of particulate matters (PM) also elevates to a hazardous level in Saharan dust that could threaten human health and early life. Exposure of PM can cause neonatal mortality either through mother exposure or through increased risks of respiratory and cardiovascular disorders in neonates.

== See also ==
- Calima (Saharan sand)
