= Kolyma Tales =

Short story collection by Varlam Shalamov

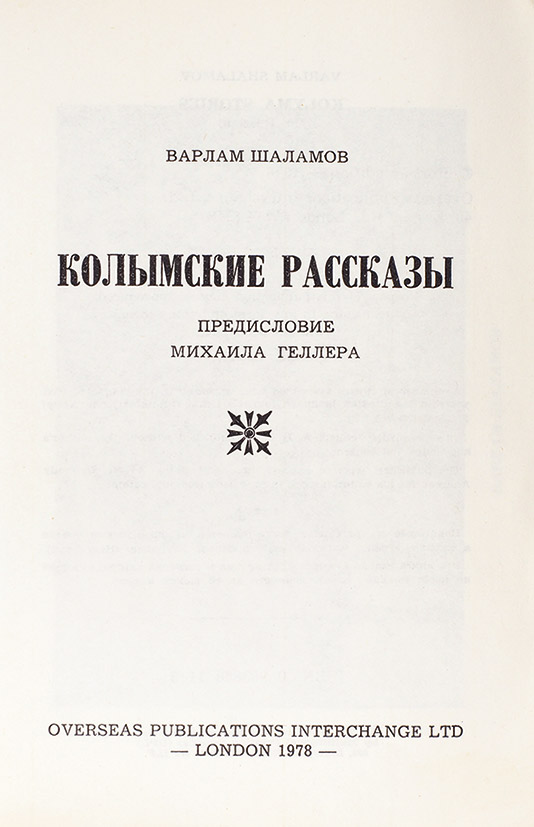
Title page of the first edition

Kolyma Tales or Kolyma Stories (Russian: Колымские рассказы, Kolymskiye rasskazy) is the name given to six collections of short stories by Russian author Varlam Shalamov, about labour camp life in the Soviet Union. Most stories are documentaries and reflect the personal experience by Shalamov. He began working on this book in 1954 and continued until 1973. The book is considered Shalamov's magnum opus as a writer and one of the important works of Russian 20th-century literature. The collections of stories are titled Kolyma Tales, The Left Bank, The Virtuoso Shovelman (or The Spade Artist), Essays on the Criminal World, Resurrection of the Larch, and The Glove, or, Kolyma Stories II.

== Background ==
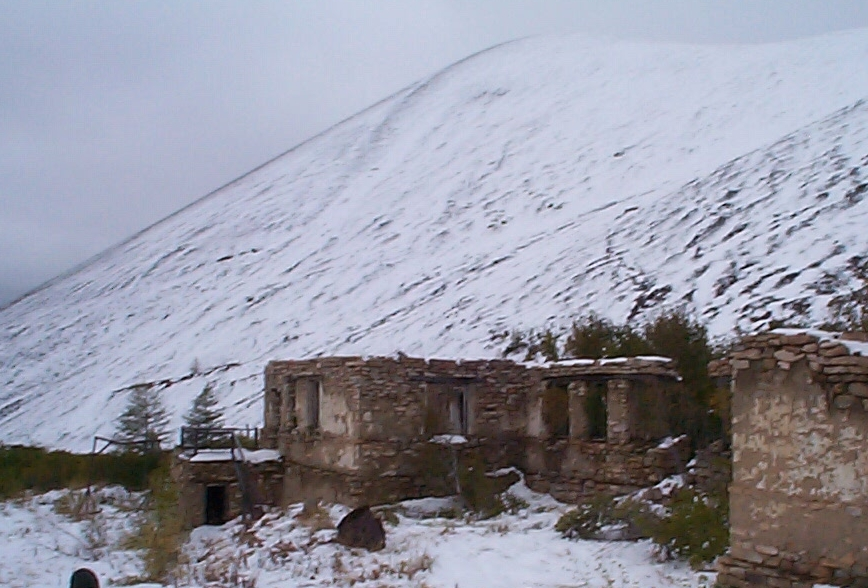
Butugychag, a uranium mine in the Kolyma area manned by prisoners of Gulag

Shalamov was born in 1907 and was arrested in 1929 while he was a student at Moscow University for attempting to publish Lenin's Testament. He was sentenced to three years in Vishera, a satellite of the extensive labour camp system centered on a former monastery on Solovki. He was arrested again in 1937 and sentenced to five years in Kolyma, northeastern Siberia. His sentence was extended in 1942 until the end of the war and then in 1943 he was sentenced to another 10 years for describing Ivan Bunin as a great Russian writer. In total Shalamov spent around 17 years in the camps.

He began to write Kolyma Tales after he was released but it was not to be published in the Soviet Union until after his death in 1982. He was able to publish five collections of poetry during his lifetime, and was well known as a poet before "Kolyma Tales" established his reputation as a Gulag writer. In 2013, the Soviet scholar David Satter wrote that "Shalamov's short stories are the definitive chronicle of those camps".

== Publication ==
The original manuscript of Kolyma Tales was taken to the United States in 1966. Individual tales were published in the New Review between 1970 and 1976. The Russian version appeared in print only in 1978 by Overseas Publications Interchange Ltd in London. They could only be printed with a note claiming that they were being published without the author's consent in order to protect Shalamov. In 1980 John Glad had Kolyma Tales published from his own translations, which featured a selection of the stories. The follow-up book, Graphite, offers further stories from Kolyma Tales.

The book first appeared in the Soviet Union in 1989 and it was bought in bulk by queues of Soviet citizens.

In 2018, the first part of the first complete English edition of the book containing the first three sets of stories was published by the New York Review of Books with translation by Donald Rayfield. The three remaining sets of stories were published in 2020.

== Style ==
Shalamov described his writing style as an emotional non-fiction, where every story "is absolutely true" and has "the authenticity of the document". Shalamov was described as writing "with cool, artful realism, without melodrama or preaching. He observes almost clinically, and in fact worked as a medical assistant in the surgical department of a camp hospital." For example, he started a short story about the final hours of poet Osip Mandelstam in a transit camp from:

The poet was dying. His big hands, swollen by starvation, with their bloodless white fingers and dirty, overgrown, curling nails, lay exposed on his chest, despite the cold. Before then he had held them against his naked body, but that body now had too little warmth. His gloves had been stolen a long time ago.

Shalamov said he considered his teachers to be modernist writers Andrei Bely and Aleksey Remizov. Shalamov himself thought that after the crimes and key moments of the 20th century, art - and the human being itself - must be rethought, and that writers should find a new form, adequate to it: "In the new prose - after Hiroshima, after Auschwitz and Kolyma, after wars and revolutions - everything didactic should be rejected. Art does not have a right to preach. Art neither ennobles nor improves people. Art is a way of life, not a way of understanding life. In other words, it is a document... a prose lived through like a document."
