= Herzenstein =

Herzenstein is a surname, meaning "heart stone" in German. Notable people with the surname include:

- Mikhail Herzenstein (1859–1906), Russian scientist and politician
- Solomon Herzenstein (1854–1894), Russian zoologist
