= Shamalov =

Shamalov (Russian: Шамалов), feminine: Shamalova is a surname. Notable people with the surname include:

- Kirill Shamalov (born 1982), Russian businessman
- Nikolai Shamalov (born 1950), Russian dentist and businessman
- Yulia Shamalova, birth name of Yulia Shamalov-Berkovich (born 1964), Israeli politician

== See also ==
- Shalamov
- Zhamalov
