= Colima (disambiguation) =

Colima may refer to:

- Colima, a state of Mexico
- Colima City, the state capital of the same name
- Colima District, district in Tibas canton of San José Province (Costa Rica)
- Colima people, Pre-Hispanic Mexican people
- Colima (volcano), a mountain
- Colima (spider), an ant spider genus
- Colima, Georgia, a community in the United States
- Colima, a former genus of plants now placed in Tigridia

== See also ==
- Kolyma
