= Seymour Itzkoff =

American psychologist and writer (born 1928)

Seymour William Itzkoff
- Born: 1928 (age 97–98); Brooklyn, New York, United States
- Education: University of Hartford (BA); Columbia University (MA, PhD)
- Known for: Research on intelligence
- Scientific career
- Fields: Educational psychology
- Workplaces: Smith College

Seymour William Itzkoff (born 1928) is an American psychologist and writer who has published research on intelligence. He has taught at Smith College since 1965 and is professor emeritus of education and child study.

== Life and career ==
Born in Brooklyn, New York, Itzkoff earned a B.A. degree from Hillyer College (later merged into the University of Hartford). His master's thesis in philosophy from Columbia University was published in 1956. While studying for his doctorate, he taught education at Hunter College, CUNY. He earned his Ph.D. from Columbia in 1965, and took a position at Smith College that year. Itzkoff was married while attending Columbia and subsequently had two children.

Itzkoff is an advocate of the effects of biological determinism on intelligence. Itzkoff suggests in Why Humans Vary in Intelligence that hereditary factors probably account for 70% to 80% of variability in IQ. He has stated that standardized test ability is difficult to improve, especially verbal ability.

Itzkoff's work on intelligence has been published in Mankind Quarterly. Itzkoff has received funding from the Pioneer Fund, which has been closely associated with eugenics and white nationalism since its founding.

According to science journalist Malcolm Browne, Itzkoff's 1994 book The Decline of Intelligence in America was one of a series of books that year which claimed Americans "probably no longer have the intellectual capital that can profit from the available educational resources." In 1994 he was one of 52 signatories on "Mainstream Science on Intelligence", an editorial written by Linda Gottfredson and published in the Wall Street Journal. This statement claimed that the academic consensus was that black people have lower average IQs than white people of the same economic background. The editorial was published in response to the controversy over the publication of the book The Bell Curve by Richard J. Herrnstein and Charles Murray.

Itzkoff wrote the preface to John Glad's 2006 book advocating for eugenics, Future Human Evolution: Eugenics in the Twenty-First Century.

Itzkoff has published works on Jewish identity and Jewish intelligence, as well as books outlining his predictions about 21st-century global crises and his recommended responses. He has also written about music, including a biography of cellist Emanuel Feuermann.

== Reception ==
In 1983 Itzkoff's published The Form of Man: The Evolutionary Origins of Human Intelligence (Paideia Publishers). In 1985 Bioanthropologist Brian T. Shea reviewed the book for American Anthropologist. Shea described it as badly written and containing many remedial errors and conclusions based on outdated findings. Itzkoff cited Carleton Coon's biased racial categorizations and, according to Shea, dismissed or ignored modern research which contradicted Itzkoff's assumptions. Shea suggested that the work was an extensions of the same racialized philosophy of Itzkoff's prior works on education.

Itzkoff's 1986 book How We Learn to Read (Paideia Publishers) was reviewed by early education professor Robert C. Cooter for American Secondary Education. Cooter said the book was historically useful, but relied on outdated findings and ignored modern research. According to Cooter, the book "fails to offer the reader any new insights and does a rather poor job of packaging the old (and sometimes bitter) wine in new bottles".

Humanity's Evolutionary Destiny: A Darwinian Perspective (2016, Peter Lang) is an overview by Itzkoff of evolution, specifically human evolution, with some discussion of Itzkoff's opinions on the genetic future of humanity. Philosopher Michael Ruse praised the book's writing and optimistic tone as appropriate for high school students or early undergrads, while saying that Itzkoff did not support many of his arguments and assumptions.

== Bibliography ==
- Cultural Pluralism and American Education. International Textbook Company. 1969. ISBN 978-0-7002-2216-2.
- Ernst Cassirer: Scientific Knowledge and the Concept of Man. University of Notre Dame Press. 1997 [1971]. ISBN 978-0-268-00937-3.
- A New Public Education. McKay. 1976. ISBN 978-0-679-30303-9.
- Ernst Cassirer, Philosopher of Culture. Twayne Publishers. 1977. ISBN 978-0-805-77712-3.
- Emanuel Feuermann, Virtuoso. University of Alabama Press. 1995 [1979]. ISBN 978-0-817-36450-2.

The Evolution of Human Intelligence series

1. The Form of Man, The Evolutionary Origins of Human Intelligence. Paideia Press. 1983. ISBN 978-0-913-99300-2.
2. Triumph of the Intelligent, The Creation of Homo sapiens sapiens. Paideia Press. 1985. ISBN 978-0-913-99301-9.
3. Why Humans Vary in Intelligence. Paideia Press. 1987. ISBN 978-0-913-99309-5.
4. The Making of the Civilized Mind. Peter Lang. 1990. ISBN 978-0-913-99311-8.
- How We Learn to Read. Paideia Press. 1986. ISBN 978-0-913-99304-0.
- The Road to Equality, Evolution and Social Reality. Praeger. 1992. ISBN 978-0-275-94400-1.
- The Decline of Intelligence in America, A Strategy for National Renewal. Praeger. 1994. ISBN 978-0-275-94467-4.
- Children Learning to Read, A Guide for Parents and Teachers. Praeger. 1996. ISBN 978-0-275-95436-9.

The Human Prospect series

1. The Inevitable Domination by Man, An Evolutionary Detective Story. Paideia Press. 2000. ISBN 978-0-913-99316-3.
2. 2050: The Collapse of the Global Techno-Economy. Paideia Press. 2003. ISBN 978-0-913-99319-4.
3. Intellectual Capital in Twenty-First-Century Politics. Paideia Press. 2003. ISBN 978-0-913-99320-0.
4. Rebuilding Western Civilization, Beyond the Twenty-First-Century Collapse. Paideia Press. 2005. ISBN 978-0-913-99321-7.

Who Are The Jews? series

1. Soul of the Israelites. Paideia Press. 2004. ISBN 978-0-913-99317-0.
2. A Nation of Philosophers. Paideia Press. 2004. ISBN 978-0-913-99318-7.
3. Fatal Gift, Jewish Intelligence and Western Civilization. Paideia Press. 2006. ISBN 978-0-913-99322-4.
- The World Energy Crisis and the Task of Retrenchment. Edwin Mellen Press. 2008. ISBN 978-0-773-45056-1.
- The End of Economic Growth: What Does It Mean for American Society?. Edwin Mellen Press. 2009. ISBN 978-0-773-44668-7.
- Judaism's Promise, Meeting the Challenge of Modernity. Peter Lang. 2014. ISBN 978-1-433-12006-0.
- Liberty's Dilemma: America, Two Nations Dependent/Independent. Peter Lang. 2014. ISBN 978-1-433-12529-4.
- Humanity's Evolutionary Destiny: A Darwinian Perspective. Peter Lang. 2016. ISBN 978-1-433-12545-4.
- 2284: World Society, Iaian Vernier's Memoir. Peter Lang. 2016. ISBN 978-1-433-13397-8.
