= Varlam Shalamov =

Soviet writer and prisoner (1907–1982)

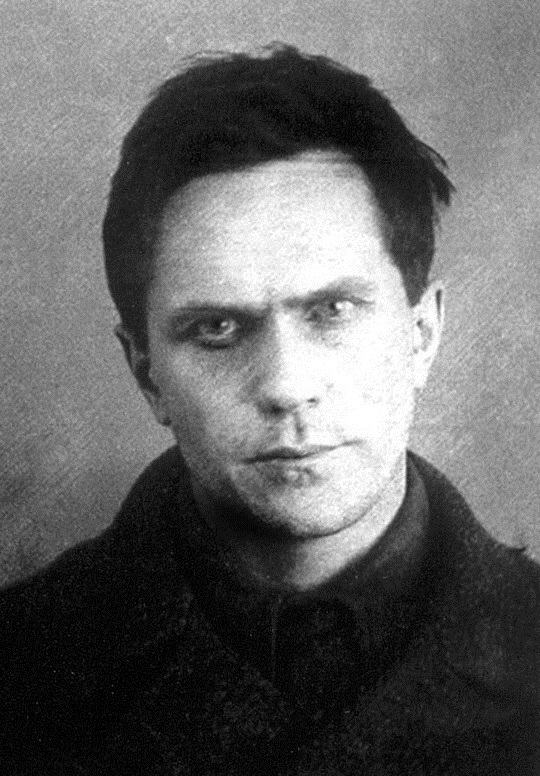
- Shalamov in 1937
- Born: 18 June 1907; Vologda, Russian Empire
- Died: 17 January 1982 (aged 74); Tushino, Moscow, Russian Soviet Federative Socialist Republic, Soviet Union
- Education: Moscow State University
- Occupations: Writer; journalist; poet
- Writing career
- Notable work: Kolyma Tales
- Website: shalamov.ru/en/

Varlam Tikhonovich Shalamov (Russian: Варла́м Ти́хонович Шала́мов; 18 June 1907 – 17 January 1982), baptized as Varlaam, was a Russian writer, journalist, poet, and Gulag survivor. He spent much of the period from 1937 to 1951 imprisoned in forced-labor camps in the Arctic region of Kolyma, due in part to his support of Leon Trotsky and praise of writer Ivan Bunin. In 1946, near death, he became a medical assistant while still a prisoner. He remained in that role for the duration of his sentence, then for another two years after being released, until 1953.

From 1954 to 1978, he wrote a set of short stories about his experiences in the labor camps, which were collected and published in six volumes, collectively known as Kolyma Tales. These books were initially published in the West, in English translation, starting in the 1960s; they were eventually published in the original Russian, but only became officially available in the Soviet Union in 1987, in the post-glasnost era. The Kolyma Tales are considered Shalamov's masterpiece, and "the definitive chronicle" of life in the labor camps.

== Early life ==
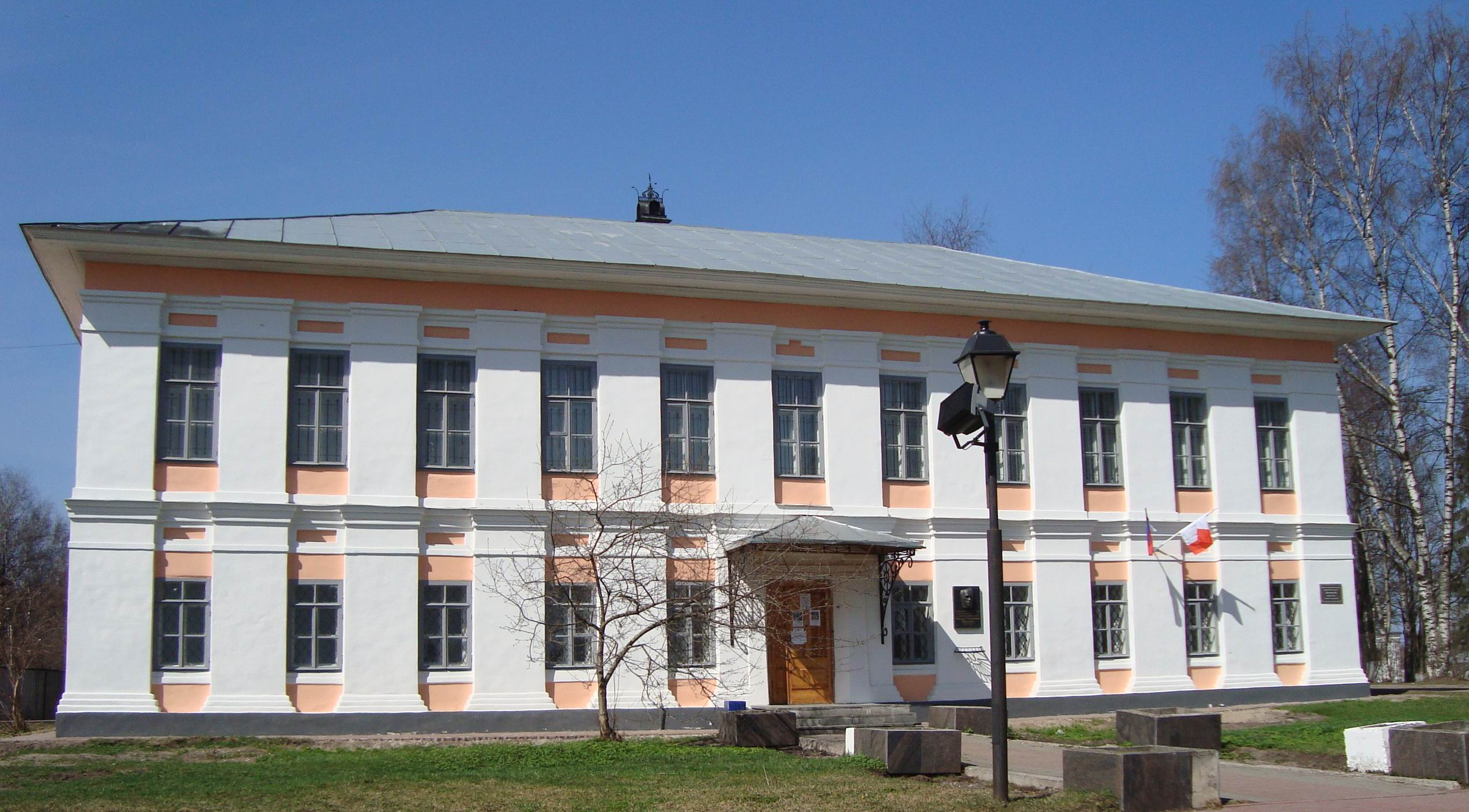
The house where Varlam Shalamov was born

Varlam Shalamov was born in Vologda, Vologda Governorate, a Russian city with a rich culture famous for its wooden architecture, to the family of a hereditary Russian Orthodox priest and teacher, Father Tikhon Nikolayevich Shalamov, a graduate of the Vologda Seminary. At first young Shalamov was named and baptized after the patron of Vologda, Saint Varlaam of Khutyn (1157–1210); Shalamov later changed his name to the more common Varlam. Shalamov's mother, Nadezhda (Nadia) Aleksandrovna, was a teacher as well. She also enjoyed poetry, and Varlam speculated that she could have become a poet if not for her family. His father worked as a missionary in Alaska for 12 years from 1892, and Varlam's older brother, Sergei, grew up there; they returned as events were heating up in Russia by 1905. In 1914, Varlam entered the gymnasium of St. Alexander's and graduated in 1923. Although he was a son of a priest, he used to say that he lost faith and became an atheist at the age of 13. His father was of very progressive views and even supported the October Revolution in a way.

Upon his graduation it became clear that the Regional Department of People's Education (RONO, Regionalnoe Otdelenie Narodnogo Obrazovania) would not support his further education because Varlam was a son of a priest. Therefore, he found a job as a tanner at the leather factory in the settlement of Kuntsevo (a suburb of Moscow, since 1960 part of the Moscow city). In 1926, after having worked for two years, he was accepted into the department of Soviet Law at Moscow State University through open competition. While studying there Varlam was intrigued by the oratory skills displayed during the debates between Anatoly Lunacharsky and Metropolitan Alexander Vvedensky. At that time Shalamov was convinced that he would become a literature specialist. His literary tastes included Modernist literature (later, he would say that he considered his teachers not Tolstoy, of whom he was very critical, or other classic writers, but Andrei Bely and Aleksey Remizov) and classic poetry. His favorite poets were Alexander Pushkin and Boris Pasternak, whose works influenced him his entire life. He also praised Dostoevsky, Savinkov, Joyce and Hemingway, about whom he later wrote a long essay depicting the myriad possibilities of artistic endeavors.

== First imprisonment, 1929–1932 ==
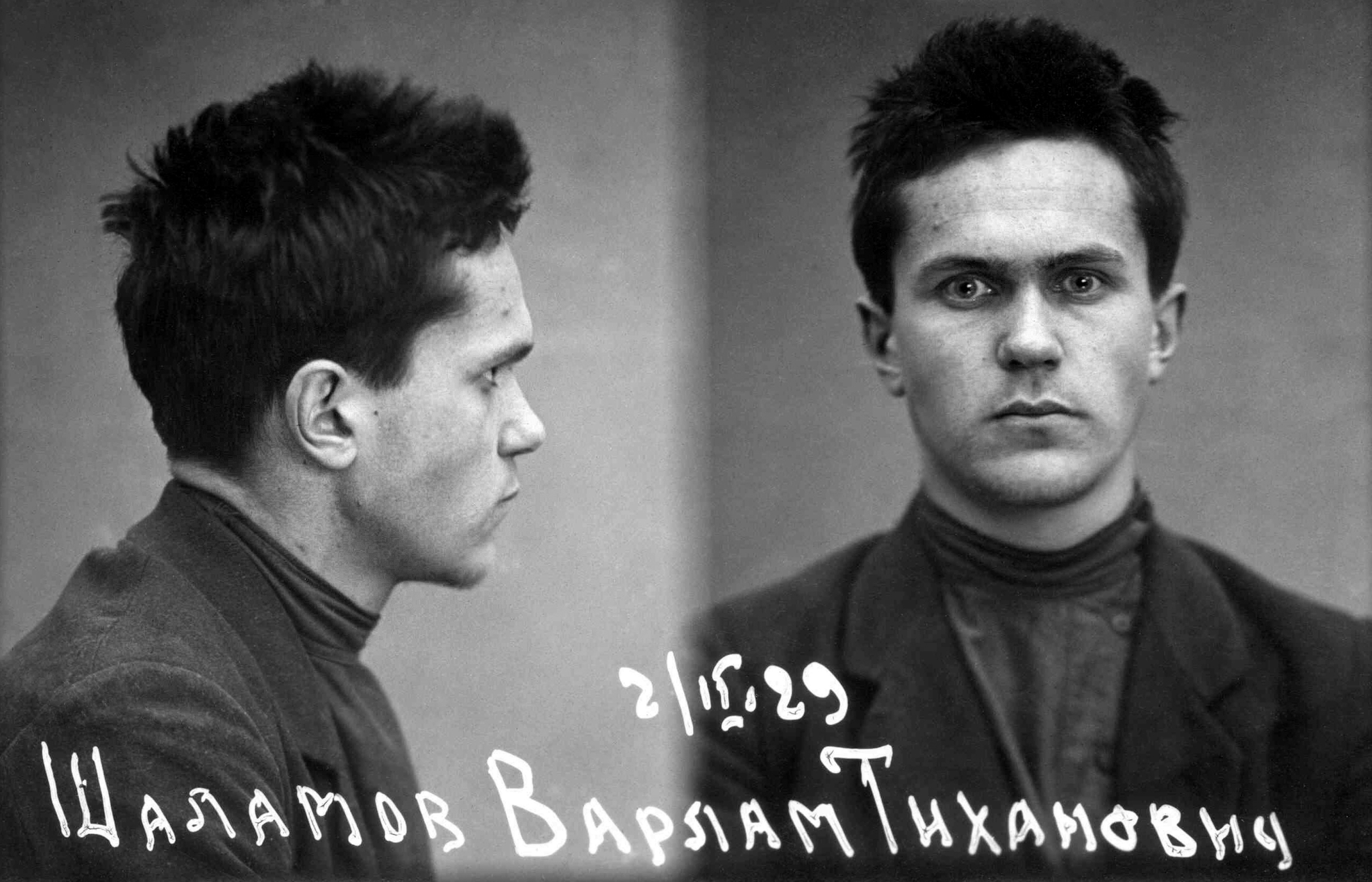
USSR PD photo of Varlam Shalamov, 1929

Shalamov joined a Trotskyist-leaning group and on February 19, 1929, was arrested and sent to Butyrskaya prison for solitary confinement. He was later sentenced to three years of correctional labor in the town of Vizhaikha, convicted of distributing the "Letters to the Party Congress" known as Lenin's Testament, which were critical of Joseph Stalin, and of participating in a demonstration marking the tenth anniversary of the Soviet revolution with the slogan "Down with Stalin". Courageously he refused to sign the sentence branding him a criminal. Later, he would write in his short stories that he was proud of having continued the Russian revolutionary tradition of members of the Socialist Revolutionary Party and Narodnaya Volya, who were fighting against tsarism. He was taken by train to the former Solikamsk monastery, which was transformed into a militsiya headquarters of the Vishera department of Solovki ITL}

Shalamov was released in 1931 and worked in the new town of Berezniki, Perm Oblast, at the local chemical plant construction site. He was given the opportunity to travel to Kolyma for colonization. Sarcastically, Shalamov said that he would go there only under enforced escort. Coincidentally, fate would hold him to his promise several years later. He returned to Moscow in 1932, where he worked as a journalist and managed to see some of his essays and articles published, including his first short story, "The three deaths of Doctor Austino" (1936).

== Second imprisonment, 1937–1942 ==
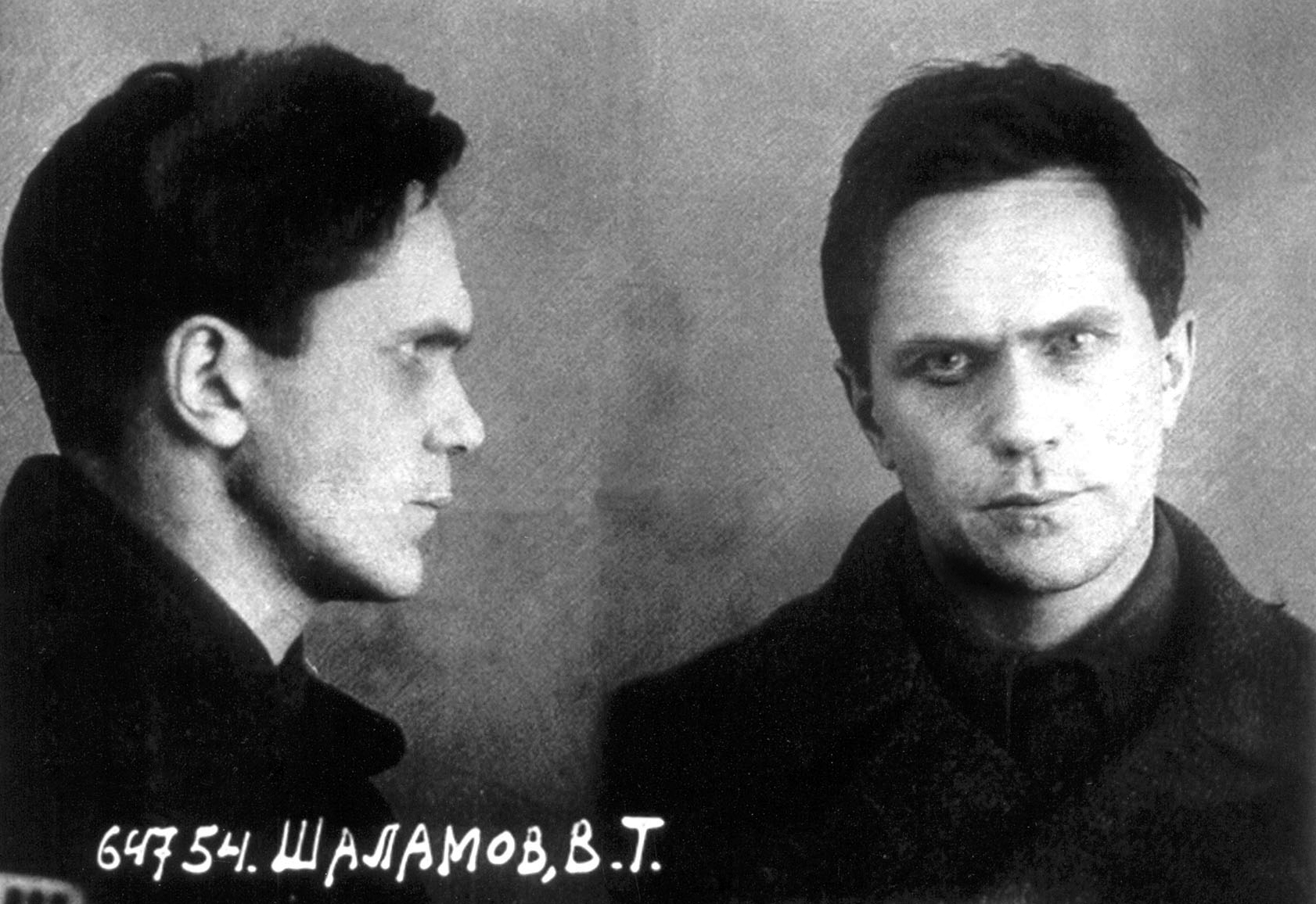
NKVD photo of Varlam Shalamov, 1937

At the outset of the Great Purge, on January 12, 1937, Shalamov was arrested again for "counter-revolutionary Trotskyist activities" and sent to Kolyma, also known as "the land of white death", for five years. He was already in jail awaiting sentencing when one of his short stories was published in the literary journal Literary Contemporary.

== Third imprisonment, 1943–1951 ==
In 1943, Shalamov was sentenced to another term, this time for 10 years, under Article 58 (anti-Soviet agitation), in part, for having called Nobelist Ivan Bunin a "great Russian writer". The conditions he endured were extreme, first in gold mining operations, and then in coal mining. He was repeatedly sent to punishment zones, both for his political crimes and for his attempt to escape. There he managed to survive while sick with typhus, of which Shalamov was not aware until he became well. At that time, as he recollects in his writings, he did not care much about his survival.

In 1946, while becoming a dohodyaga (one in an emaciated and devitalized state, which in Russian literally means one who is walking towards the ultimate end), his life was saved by a doctor-inmate, A. I. Pantyukhov, who risked his own life to get Shalamov a place as a camp hospital attendant. The new career allowed Shalamov to survive and concentrate on writing poetry.

== After release ==
In 1951, Shalamov was released from the camp, and continued working as a medical assistant for the forced labor camps of Sevvostlag while still writing. After his release, he was faced with the dissolution of his former family, including a grown-up daughter who now refused to recognize her father. In 1952, Shalamov sent his poetry to Boris Pasternak, who praised his work. Shalamov was allowed to leave Magadan in November 1953 following Stalin's death in March of that year, and was permitted to go to the village of Turkmen in Kalinin Oblast, near Moscow, where he worked as a supply agent.

From 1954 to 1973, Shalamov worked on his book of short stories of labour camp life, Kolyma Tales. During the Khrushchev thaw, many inmates were released from the Gulag and politically rehabilitated. Some were rehabilitated posthumously. Shalamov was allowed to return to Moscow after having been officially exonerated ("rehabilitated") on July 18, 1956 by the Military Collegium of the Supreme Court of the Soviet Union. In 1957, he became a correspondent for the literary journal Moskva, and his poetry began to be published. His health, however, had been broken by his years in the camps, and he received a disability pension.

Shalamov proceeded to publish poetry and essays in the major Soviet literary magazines while writing his magnum opus, Kolyma Tales. He was acquainted with Aleksandr Solzhenitsyn, Boris Pasternak, and Nadezhda Mandelstam. The manuscripts of Kolyma Tales were smuggled abroad and distributed via samizdat. The translations were published in the West in 1966. The complete Russian-language edition was published in London in 1978, and reprinted thereafter both in Russian and in translation. As the Soviet scholar David Satter writes, "Shalamov's short stories are the definitive chronicle of those camps". Kolyma Tales is considered to be one of the great Russian collections of short stories of the twentieth century.

Late in life, Shalamov got on bad terms with Solzhenitsyn and other fellow dissidents, and opposed the publication of his own works abroad.

Gospodin Solzhenitsyn, I willingly accept Your funeral joke on the account of my death. With the feeling of honor and pride I consider myself the first Cold War victim which have fallen from Your hand … – From the undispatched letter of V. T. Shalamov to A. I. Solzhenitsyn

Shalamov also wrote a series of autobiographical essays that vividly bring to life the city of Vologda and his life before prison.

== Last years ==
As his health deteriorated, he spent the last three years of his life in a house for elderly and disabled writers operated by Litfond (Union of Soviet Writers) in Tushino. The quality of this nursing home can be judged from the memoirs of Yelena Zakharova, who was introduced to Shalamov by her father, who had translated some of his works, and was close to Shalamov in the last six months of his life:

This kind of places—this is the worst and most obvious evidence of deformation of the human mind, which happened in our country in the 20th century. Man is not only deprived of the right to a decent life, but also to die with dignity.

Despite his impairments, he continued to compose poems, which were written down and published by A. A. Morozov. Following a cursory examination, it was determined that he should be transferred to a psychiatric facility. On the way there, he became ill and contracted pneumonia. Shalamov died on January 17, 1982, and, despite having been an atheist, was given an Orthodox funeral ceremony (at the insistence of his friend, Zakharova) and was interred at Kuntsevo Cemetery, Moscow. The historian Valery Yesipov wrote that only forty people attended Shalamov's funeral, not counting plainclothes policemen.

Kolyma Tales was finally published on Russian soil in 1987, as a result of Mikhail Gorbachev's glasnost policy.

== Legacy ==
In 1991, the Shalamov family house in Vologda, next to the town's cathedral, was turned into the Shalamov Memorial Museum and local art gallery. The cathedral hill in Vologda has been named in his memory.

One of the Kolyma short stories, "The Final Battle of Major Pugachoff", was made into a film (Последний бой майора Пугачёва) in 2005. In 2007, Russian Television produced the series "Lenin's Testament"(Завещание Ленина), based on Kolyma Tales. A minor planet 3408 Shalamov discovered by Soviet astronomer Nikolai Stepanovich Chernykh in 1977 is named after him. A memorial to Shalamov was erected in Krasnovishersk in June 2007, the site of his first labor camp.

Shalamov's friend, Fedot Fedotovich Suchkov, erected a monument on the burial plot, which was destroyed by unknown vandals in 2001. The criminal case was closed as uncompleted. With the help of some workers from SeverStal the monument was reestablished in 2001.

== Bibliography ==
=== In Russian ===
- Три смерти доктора Аустинo [The Three Deaths of Dr. Austino] (1936)
- Собрание сочинений в четырех томах [Collected Works in Four Volumes] (1998)
- Воспоминания [Memoirs] (2001)

=== In English translation ===
- "A Good Hand" and "Caligula" in Russia's Other Writers, ed. Michael Scammel (Longman, 1970)
- Kolyma Tales, trans. John Glad (Norton, 1980; Penguin, 1994)
- Graphite, trans. John Glad (Norton, 1981)
- Kolyma Tales / Graphite, trans. John Glad (Penguin, 1991)
- Kolyma Stories, trans. Donald Rayfield (New York Review Books, 2018)
- Sketches of the Criminal World: Further Kolyma Stories, trans. Donald Rayfield (New York Review Books, 2020)
- The Twenties, translated, edited and introduced by Cathy Porter (Rab-Rab Press, Helsinki, 2026)

== See also ==
- History of the Soviet Union
- Enemy of the people
- 101st km
- Karlo Štajner
- Alexander Solzhenitsyn
- Lev Razgon
- Evgenia Ginzburg

== Publications ==
- ISBN 0-14-018695-6 Kolyma Tales
- ISBN 0-393-01476-2 Graphite
- ISBN 5-17-004492-5 Vospominaniia (memoirs)
- Varlam Shalamov (1998) "Complete Works" (Варлам Шаламов. Собрание сочинений в четырех томах)( (Varlam Shalamov. Collected Works in Four Volumes), printed by publishers Vagrius and Khudozhestvennaya Literatura, ISBN 5-280-03163-1, ISBN 5-280-03162-3
