= Kalima (magazine) =

Moroccan women's magazine (1986–1989)

- Editor: Hind Taarji
- Categories: Women's magazine; News magazine
- Publisher: Nourreddine Ayouch
- Founder: Union de l'Action Feminine
- Founded: 1986
- Final issue: April 1989
- Country: Morocco
- Language: French

Kalima (meaning both ''Word'' and ''the act of Speaking'' in English) was a monthly women's magazine and news magazine published in Morocco between 1986 and 1989. The magazine was a feminist publication and the first women's magazine in the country.

== History and profile ==
Kalima was established in 1986. The founder was a radical women organization, Union de l'Action Feminine. The publisher was Nourreddine Ayouch.

The magazine's goal was to emphasize that "gender roles, sexuality, and even division of labor were neither divinely prescribed nor ordained by nature, but had a historical origin." It adopted a progressive feminist stance in dealing with social, economic, political and cultural aspects of women's life. It also addressed critical issues in Morocco, including abandoned children in the country. It was the first Moroccan magazine which contained articles on taboo subjects such as abortion, child prostitution, single mothers, drugs and sexuality. In addition, Kalima included pages on news and on cinema.

The founding and only editor-in-chief of the magazine was Hind Taarji. Fatima Mernissi was among the contributors of Kalima.

The Moroccan authorities confiscated the March 1989 issue of the magazine which contained articles about male prostitution and the lack of free press in Morocco. These publications led to the closure of the magazine on 25 April 1989.
