= John Glad =

American academic and eugenicist (1941–2015)

John Glad (December 31, 1941 – December 4, 2015) was an American academic who specialized in the literature and politics of exile, especially Russian literature. He also wrote about, and advocated for, eugenics.

== Biography ==
John Glad was born in Gary, Indiana in a family of immigrants from Croatia. His surname in Croatian means "hunger". "I am Ivan Hunger", he used to tell his Russian colleagues.

At age of 17 he began studying Russian and spoke it fluently, which undoubtedly contributed to his marriage to Larisa, nee Romanova, whom he brought from Saratov.

Following Glad's death in 2015, writer Vladimir Voinovich said in a blog post that "Он был известен как очень хороший синхронный переводчик"transl. He was known as a very good simultaneous translator, and as such he was invited to interpret speeches of high-ranking people from Russia, including Mikhail Gorbachev.

Glad received his MA from Indiana University in 1964 for his thesis "Constance Garnett and David Magarshack as translators of Crime and punishment.", and his Ph.D. degree from New York University in 1970 for his thesis "Russian Soviet science fiction and related critical activity".

== Academic work ==
Glad was a professor of Russian studies at the University of Maryland, and had previously taught at Rutgers University, the University of Chicago, and the University of Iowa. He was also the Director of the Kennan Institute for Advanced Russian Studies in the Woodrow Wilson International Center for Scholars, in Washington, D.C. (1982–1983), and a Guggenheim Grant recipient (1981). He had written for The Jewish Press, Mankind Quarterly and was interviewed for white nationalist publication The Occidental Quarterly. He was the translator from the Russian of The Black Book: The Ruthless Murder of Jews by German-Fascist Invaders Throughout the Temporarily-Occupied Regions of the Soviet Union and in the Death Camps of Poland During the War of 1941–1945, edited by Ilya Erenburg and Vasily Grossman.

== History of eugenics ==
Glad wrote two books on the subject of eugenics. Future Human Evolution: Eugenics in the Twenty-First Century advanced humanistic arguments in favour of universal eugenics and has been translated into twelve languages. His second book on the subject, Jewish Eugenics (2011), traced the interactions between Jewish thinkers and activists, and eugenics.

== Published works ==
=== Books ===
- Glad, John. 2006. Future Human Evolution: Eugenics in the Twenty-First Century; preface by Seymour Itzkoff. Schuylkill Haven, PA: Hermitage Publishers.
  - translated into Russian as Budushchai︠a︡ ėvoli︠u︡t︠s︡ii︠a︡ cheloveka : evgenika XXI veka
  - Translated into Urdu as Mustaqbil kā insānī irtiqāʼ : ikkīsvīn̲ ṣadī men̲ ʻilm-i iṣlāḥ-i nauʻ-i insānī,
- Glad, John. 2011. Jewish Eugenics. Wooden Shore L.L.C., Washington, D.C.
- Glad, John. 1999. Russia Abroad: Writers, History, Politics. Tenafly, NJ: Hermitage & Birchbark Press.
    - review, A. Brintlinger, Russian Review 59, Part 3 (2000): 453
    - review, V. Terras, Slavic Review 62, Part 2 (2003): 423
    - review, L. Dienes, Slavic and East European Journal 44, Part 4 (2000): 672-674
    - review, W Coudenys, Russian History 27(2): (2000): 247-249
    - review, A Rogachevskii, The Slavonic and East European Review, Apr., 2001, vol. 79, no. 2, p. 357-360
- Glad, John, and Daniel Weissbort. 1992. Twentieth-Century Russian Poetry. Iowa City: University of Iowa Press.
- Glad, John. 1993. Conversations in Exile: Russian Writers Abroad. Durham: Duke University Press.
    - review, Slavonic and East European Review, Oct., 1994, vol. 72, no. 4, p. 723-724.
    - review, Modern Language Review, Jan., 1995, vol. 90, no. 1, p. 271
    - review, Slavic and East European Journal, Winter, 2000, vol. 44, no. 4, p. 672-675
- Glad, John. 1990. Literature in Exile. Durham: Duke University Press.
  - review, SubStance, 1992, vol. 21, no. 1, p. 137-142
  - review, Slavonic and East European Review, Jul., 1991, vol. 69, no. 3, p. 539
- Glad, John 1982 Extrapolations from dystopia : a critical study of Soviet science fiction Kingston Press, 1982
    - review, Slavic Review, Spring, 1983, vol. 42, no. 1, p. 157-158
- Glad, John, and Daniel Weissbort. 1978. Russian Poetry, the Modern Period. Iowa City: University of Iowa Press.
    - review, Slavic and East European Journal, Autumn, 1979, vol. 23, no. 3, p. 407-408
    - review, Modern Language Journal, Nov., 1979, vol. 63, no. 7, p. 388-389

=== Russian literature translations ===
- Generations of Winter, by Vasily Aksenov
- The Winter's Hero, by Vasily Aksenov New York : Random House, c1996 ISBN 978-0-679-43274-6
- Kolyma Tales, by Varlam Shalamov
- Poems, by Nikolai Klyuev
- Graphite, by Varlam Shalamov

== See also ==
- Seymour Itzkoff
