= Tikhon Shalamov =

Priest of the Russian Orthodox Church (1868–1933)

Tihon Šalamov
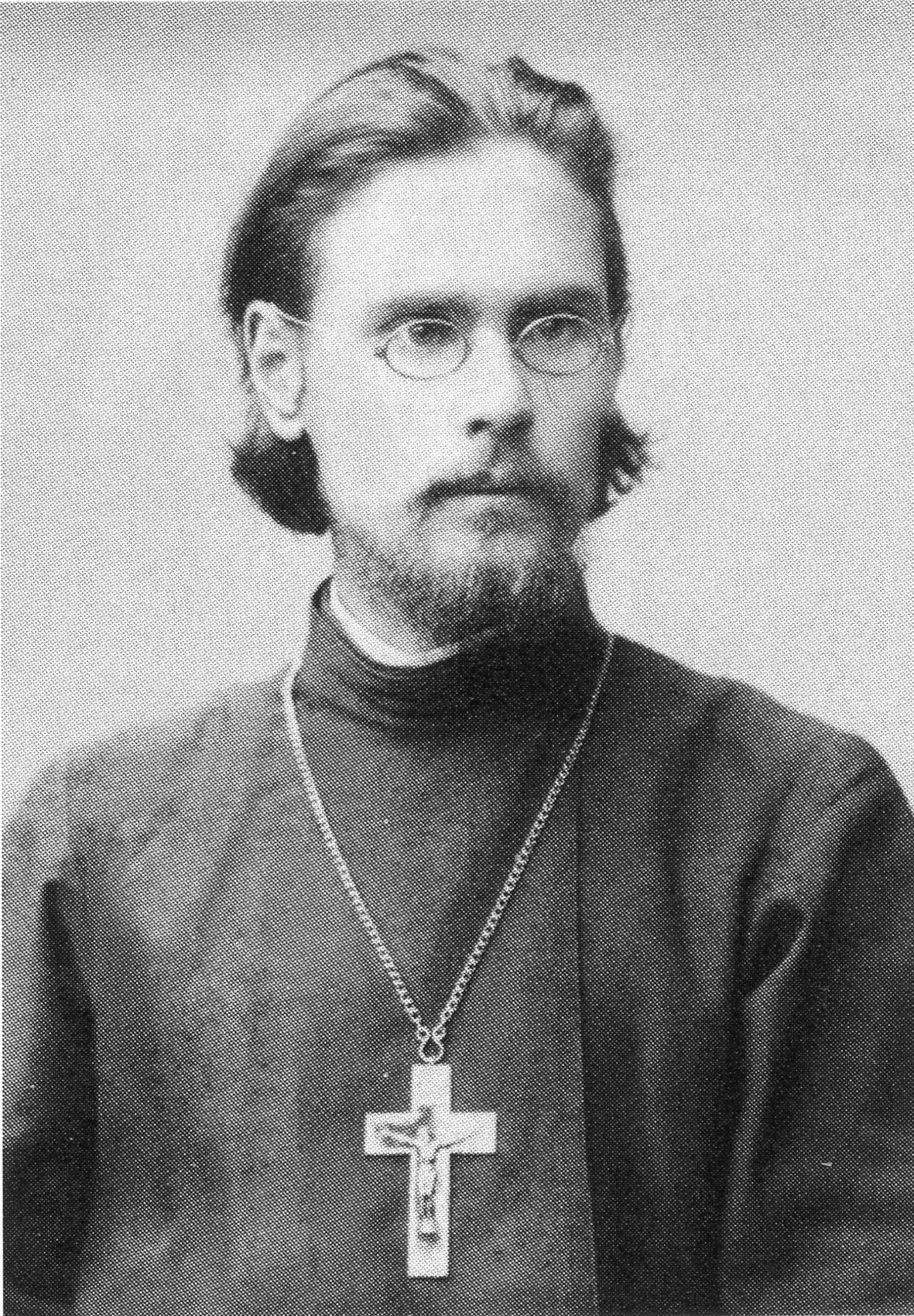
- Born: 1868; Votcha, Ust’-Sysol’sky uyezd, Russia
- Died: 1933 (aged 64–65); Vologda, Soviet Union
- Occupation: Priest
- Years active: 1890–1933

Tikhon Nikolayevich Shalamov (August 5, 1868 – March 3, 1933, Vologda), was a priest in the Russian Orthodox Church, a missionary, an activist in the Living Church movement, and a publicist. He was the father of the well-known Soviet writer and Gulag survivor Varlam Shalamov.

== Life ==
Shalamov was born on August 5, 1868, in the village of Votcha, Ust-Sysolsky district. His father was the priest of the Votcha parish, Nikolai Ioannovich Shalamov (1827–1910), his mother was Tatyana Andreyevna Musnikova, the daughter of a sexton from the city of Veliky Ustyug.

After graduating from the Vologda Theological Seminary in 1890, he was a teacher at a church parish school.

He was sent to Alaska at the recommendation of Bishop Nikolai (Ziorov) of Alaska and the Aleutians, who had previously served as inspector of the Vologda Theological Seminary. From 1893 to 1904, he was an Orthodox missionary in Kodiak Island.

Upon arrival in America, he was ordained a priest and appointed to a position at the Holy Resurrection Church on Kodiak Island by the Russian Orthodox Church, in the North American Diocese. He is the author of several articles in the Russian American Orthodox Messenger. In 1902, he opened the St. Tikhon and St. Mary of Egypt Temperance Society in Alaska and became its chairman. He was a caretaker and religious teacher at the St. Ioasaf and St. Herman orphanages, and was the leader of the St. Innocent Brotherhood of Mutual Aid. In 1904 he was awarded a pectoral gold cross "for steadfast service to the benefit of Orthodoxy among non-Orthodox peoples" and the Order of St. Anne, 3rd degree.

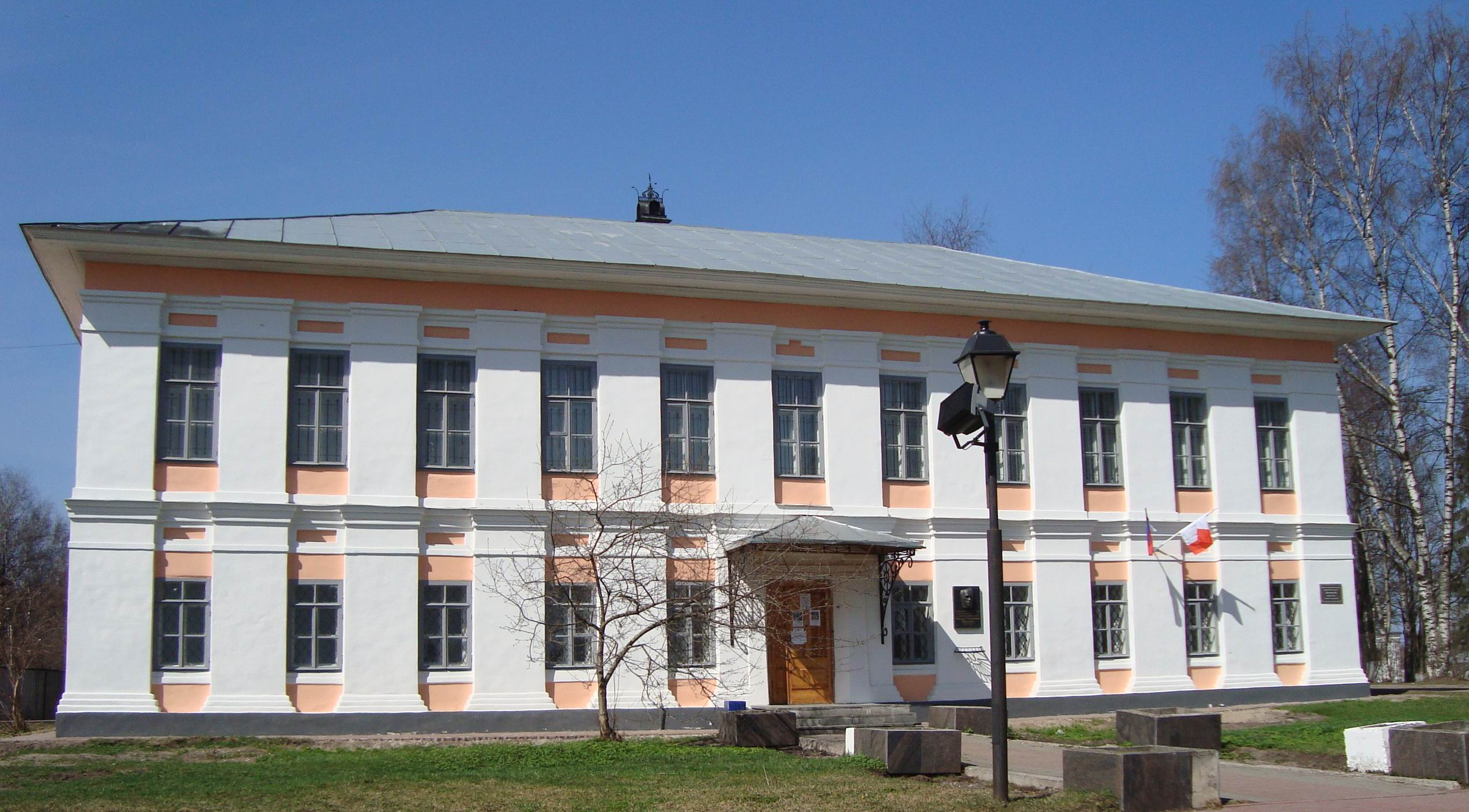
The Shalamov home in Vologda.

In 1904 he returned to Vologda, where he served as a priest in the Alexander Nevsky Church next to the St. Sophia Cathedral (according to other sources, in the Ascension Church). He was a teacher of religion at the Kolesnikovsky parish school and the 2nd girls’ gymnasium. In 1906 he was transferred to the position of a full-time priest at the St. Sophia Cathedral. Varlam Shalamov recalls in The Fourth Vologda:

For the church authorities, this was a good decision – a young priest from overseas service, fluent in English, French and German with a dictionary, a lecturer, a missionary and a social organizer through and through…

True, the locals were shocked by Father Tikhon's behavior. The new priest of the city's main church liked to dress in the latest fashion, was an avid hunter and fisherman. He masterfully made fishing boats, and did it right in the yard of his house. Whole crowds of onlookers gathered to watch the "priest with a plane.”

But the main thing was his active participation in the public life of the city: Tikhon Shalamov was a caretaker and teacher in children's shelters, and chairman of the temperance society. When a wave of Jewish pogroms swept across Russia, and on July 14, 1906, Mikhail Herzenstein was killed, Father Tikhon gave a speech in the cathedral in his defense and held a memorial service for him. This brought upon him the wrath of the Vologda church authorities, but he did not change his views. He communicated with the lawyer A. M. Vinogradov.

After the revolution, he joined the "Living Church" movement and took an active part in the activities of the Renovationists.

In 1918, difficult times came for the Shalamov family. After the revolution, it became almost impossible to find work for a priest, and the Shalamovs suffered financial difficulties. In 1917–1918, he served in the church of the Sokol factory. In 1920, Tikhon Nikolaevich went blind and could no longer conduct church services, but he actively attended public debates between atheist Communist party members and priests. Varlam Shalamov led his father to all the debates as a guide.

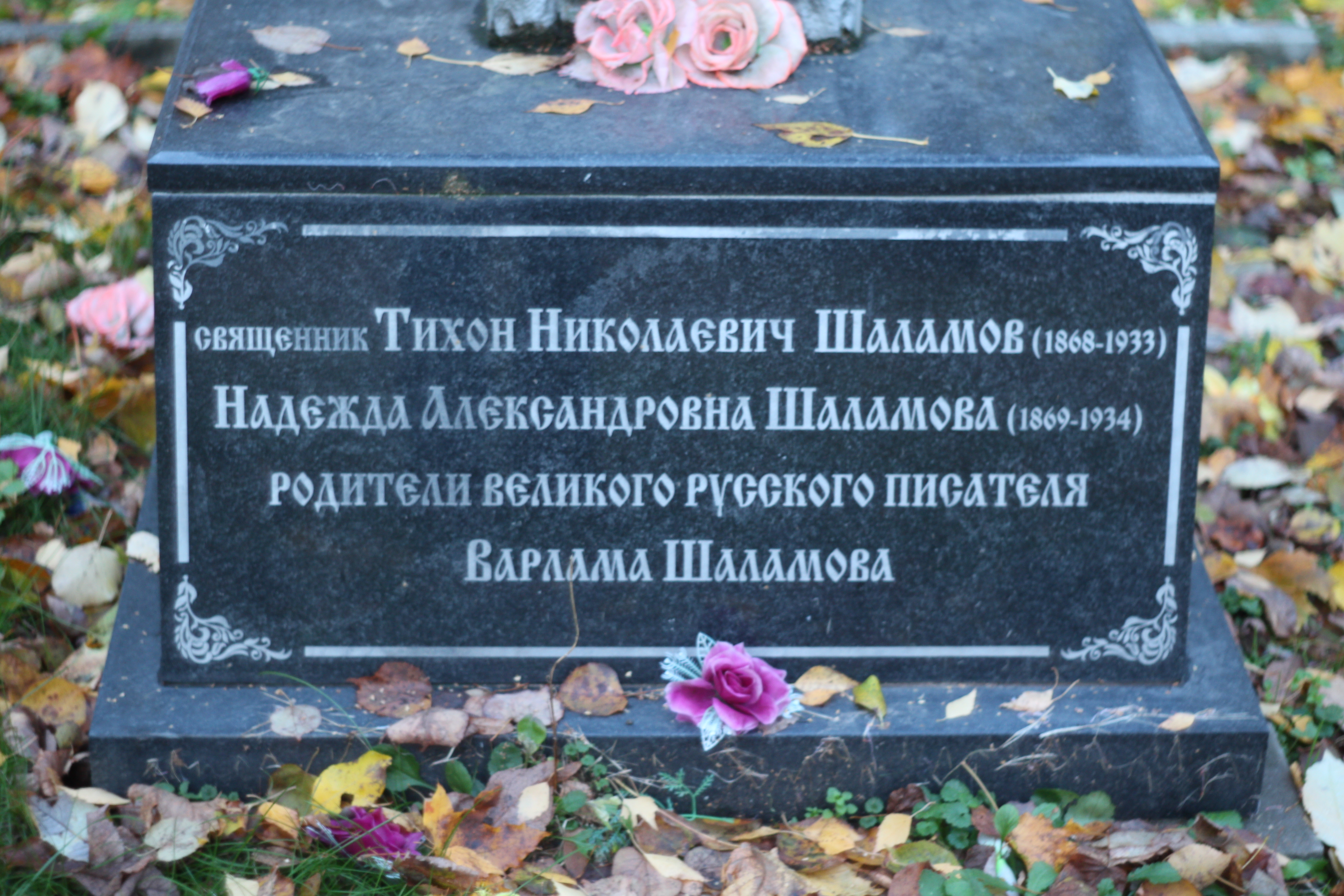
The tombstone of Tikhon Shalamov, Vvedenskoye Cemetery, installed in the 2010s. Detail.

In the 1920s, the Soviet authorities allowed such verbal battles for educational purposes. Thanks to this, the Pastoral Theological School could still exist, where, as evidenced by the photograph found, Father Shalamov taught. At one time, he worked in a bookstore. Father Tikhon died on March 3, 1933, presumably from pneumonia. He was buried in Vologda at the Vvedenskoye Cemetery (the grave has not survived). A cenotaph was erected for him in the 2010s.

== Family ==
- Brother – Prokopy (1876 – May 1931) – priest in the Votcha parish of the Ust-Sysolsky district. Shot on charges of resisting collectivization, did not plead guilty.
- Sisters – two married to priests, one of them was a teacher in the village of Votcha.
- Wife – Nadezhda Aleksandrovna (née Vorobyova) (1869–1934) – taught in her last years in Kodiak, for which she was awarded a bishop's certificate "for unpaid teaching work in a local school".
- Son – Valery (1893–?), an officer in the tsarist army, refused to serve in the Red Army, after which, according to the biographers of his brother Varlam, he was recruited as an informant for the OGPU.
- Daughter – Galina (1895–1987) lived in Sukhumi.
- Son – Sergei (1898–1920) died in the civil war, fighting on the side of the Reds.
- Daughter – Natalia (1899–?), in the 1930s – a paramedic in Nizhny Novgorod.
- Son – Varlam (June 18, 1907 – January 17, 1982), writer and poet.

== Publications ==
- Kratkoye yserkovno-istoricheskoye opisaniye Kad’iakskogo prihhoda. (‘A short church history of the Kodiak Parish’).
- Grosnaya opasnost’. [Alkogolism] [‘A Grave Danger (Alcoholism)’]. Vologda: Vologod. pastys. sojuz bor’by c p’janstvom. 1991. 24 s.
- Father Tikhon Shalamov's speech at the funeral of Mikhail Herzenstein.
- "Golos novoĭ tserkvi". (K otkrytiyu novogo Yeparkhial’nogo Upravleniya). [‘The voice of hte new church. (The opening of the administration of the new diocese.’) // Tserkovnaya zarya [‘The dawn of the church]. 1922. – No. 1, 15. September 1922, p. 4–9.

== Literature ==
- Shalamov, Varlam, "Chetvërtaya Vologda" / Published by I. P. Sirotinskaya // Nashe nasledie. — 1988. — No. 4., p. 86–102.
- Konovalov, F. Ia., "Otets Varlama Shalamova" // Krasnyi Sever. — Vologda, 1990. February 18.
- Yesipov, V., "Kad’iaksky syuzhet Varlama Shalamova" // Russkaya Amerika. 1993. — No. 1, p. 22–23.
- Sirotinskaya, I., "Iz istorii roda Shalamovykh" // Shalamovsky cbornik. — Vyp. 1. / Sostavitel’ V. V. Yepisov. — Vologda, 1994. — P. 244–247.
  - Sirotinskaya, I., "Из истории рода [Шаламовых]" // Лад. 1994. — No. 6. — С. 3–9.
- Klein, L., "Новое об отце Шаламова." // Shalamovsky cbornik / [Sostavitel’ V. V. Yesipov]. — Vologda, 1997. — Vyp.. 2, p. 185–192.
- Byalik, S., "Sensatsiya c cherdaka" // Prem’yer – novosti za nedelyu. 2002. — No. 22 (248). June 12, 2002.
- Kubasov, A. L., "Protoierey Tikhon Shalamov kak ideolog «obnovlenchestva» v Vologodskoi yeparkhii" // Tserkov v istorii Rossii: [collection of articles] — 2010. — Sb. 9., p. 223–229.
- Yesipov, Valery Vasil’yevich (2012). Shalamov (Zhizn' zamechatel'nykh lyudei) [‘Shalamov (Lives of remarkable people’]. Moscow: Molodaya gvardiya. p. 346. ISBN 978-5-235-03528-7.
- Larionov, Valery Veniaminovich, archpriest (2016). Obnovleycheskiy raskol v portretakh ego deyatelei (Materialy po istorii Tserkvi, kniga 54 [‘The Renovationist Schism in Portraits of Its Leaders (Materials on the History of the Church. Book 54’]. Moscow: Society of lovers of church history. pp. 572–573, 736. ISBN 978-5-9906510-7-4.
- Belenkin, Boris Isayevich: Vzglyad Shalamova-memuarista na tserkovnoi raskol 1920-kh gg.: obnovlenchestvo na stranitsakh «Chetvertoy Vologdy» i v obshchestvenno-politicheskoy i tserkovnoy istorii SSSR 1920-kh‒1930-kh gg. // Zakon soprotivleniya raspadu. Osobennosti prozy i poezii Varlama Shalamova i ikh vospriyatiye v nachale XXI veka. Sbornik nauchnykh trudov. — Praga: Nats. b-ka Cheshskoy Respubliki — Slavyanskaya b-ka; Moskva: Shalamov.ru, 2017. p. 169–182.

== External links (in Russian) ==
- Shalamov, Tikhon Nikolajevich
- Irina Sirotinskaja, Valeri Esipov. On the history of the Shalamov family.
- Фёдор Коновалов. The father of Varlam Shalamov // Русский огонек. — 1994. — № 27
- Notes. The Fourth Vologda
