= Al Kalima =

Daily newspaper published in Libya

- Type: Daily newspaper
- Format: Broadsheet
- Founder: Mohamed Elmozogi
- Founded: 1 May 2011; 14 years ago
- Language: Arabic
- Headquarters: Benghazi
- Country: Libya
- Website: Al Kalima

Al Kalima (Arabic: الكلمة, The Word) is an Arabic daily newspaper published in Libya. It is one of the newspapers established during or following the Libyan revolution which toppled Muammar Ghaddafi in 2011.

== History and profile ==
Al Kalima was launched by Mohamed Elmozogi in May 2011. The paper is headquartered in Benghazi. It has 16 pages and is published in broadsheet format. In June 2011, the circulation of the daily was about 4,000 copies.

Al Kalima is one of the independent papers in Libya in that it does not represent and have affiliation with any political interest groups and parties. The paper covers news and features and is much more professionally run in contrast to others in the country. Amal Omar Shennib is among the frequent contributors.
