= Saharan air layer =

Hot, dry and sometimes dust-laden atmospheric layer

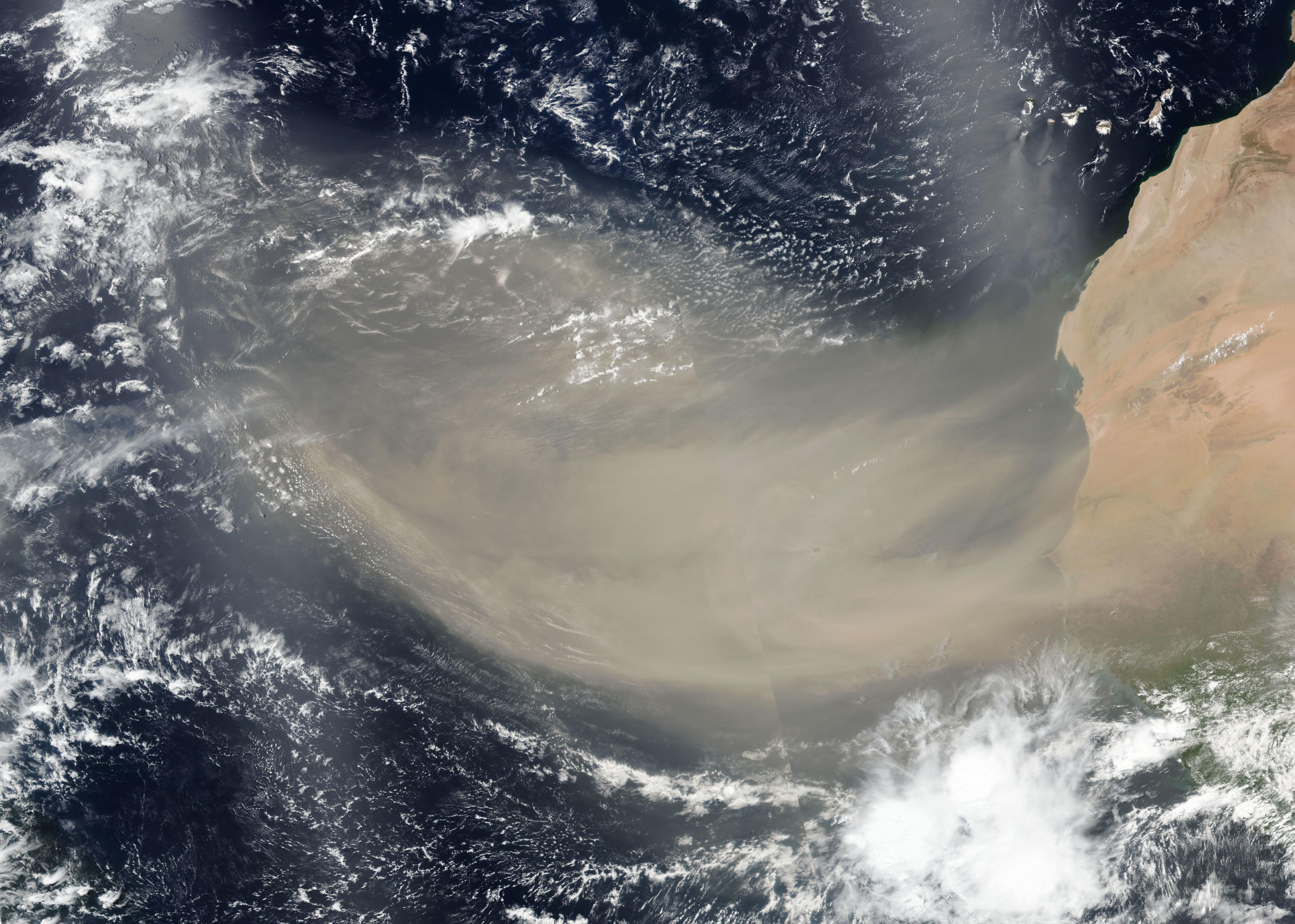
Dust off Western Africa in 2020

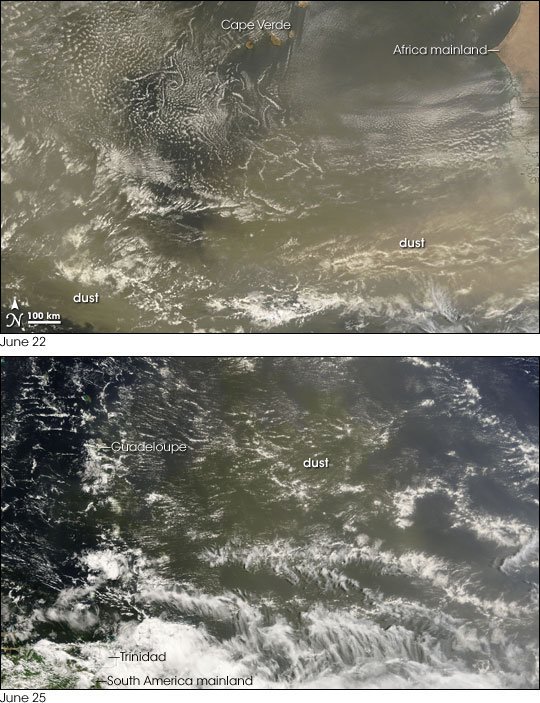
Images showing Saharan dust crossing the Atlantic

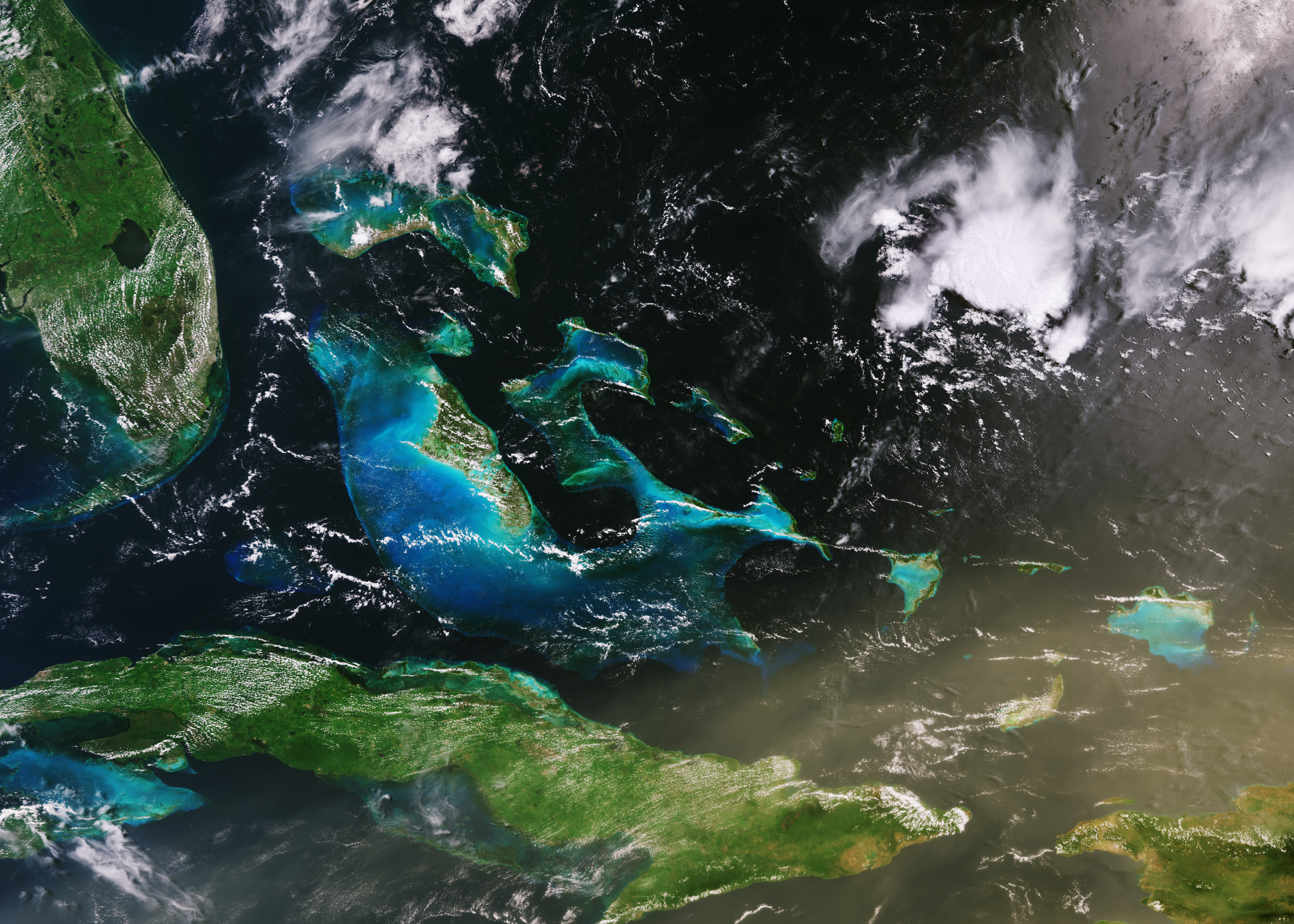
Dust particles can be seen as far as Cuba

The Saharan air layer (SAL) is an extremely hot, dry, and sometimes dust-laden layer of the atmosphere that often overlies the cooler, more humid surface air of the Atlantic Ocean. It carries upwards of 60 million tons of dust annually over the ocean and the Americas. This annual phenomenon sometimes cools the ocean and suppresses Atlantic tropical cyclogenesis.

The SAL is a subject of ongoing study and research. Its existence was first postulated in 1972.

== Creation ==
The dust cloud originates in Saharan Africa and extends from the surface upwards several kilometers. As the dust drives, or is driven out over the Atlantic Ocean, it is lifted above the denser marine air. This atmospheric arrangement is an inversion where the temperature actually increases with height, as the boundary between the SAL and the marine layer suppresses or "caps" any convection originating in the marine layer. Since it is dry air, the lapse rate within the SAL itself is steep, that is, the temperature falls rapidly with height.

Disturbances such as large thunderstorm complexes over North Africa periodically result in vast dust and sand storms, some of which extend as high as 6,000 metres (20,000 ft). The layer is transported westwards across the Atlantic by a series of broad anticyclonic eddies that are typically found 1,500–4,500 metres (4,900–14,800 ft) above sea level. An estimated 60-200 million tons of dust particles are carried from the Sahara Desert region of North Africa, where it originates, and moves westward annually.

Sometimes a depression to the southwest of the Canary Islands increases the wind speed and intensity of the SAL, which can lift the dust around 5,000 metres (16,000 ft) into the air and often carries the dust as far as the Caribbean.

== Effects ==
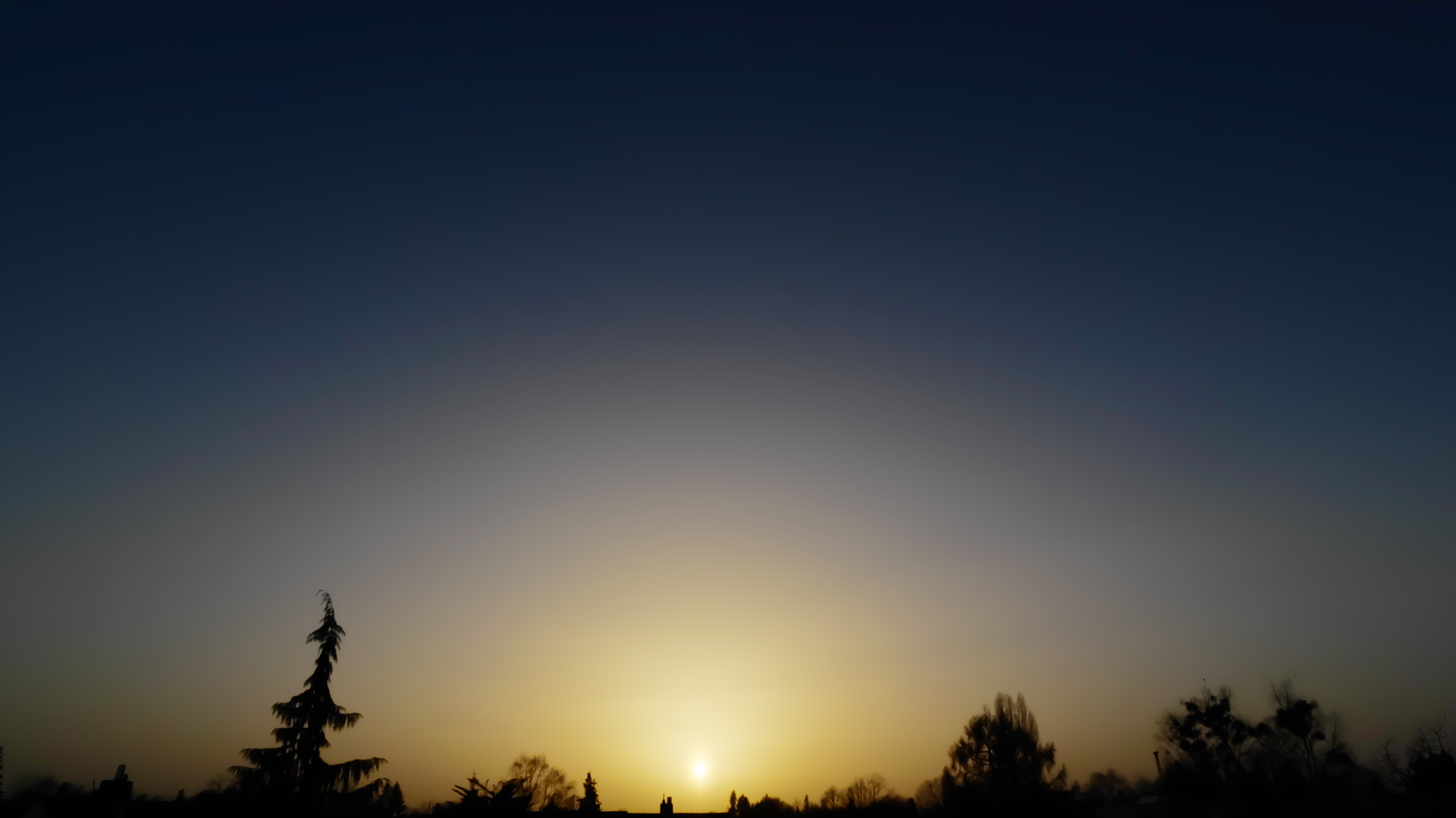
Lithometeor at sun set in Berlin on February 25, 2021, cloudless sky with Saharan air layer

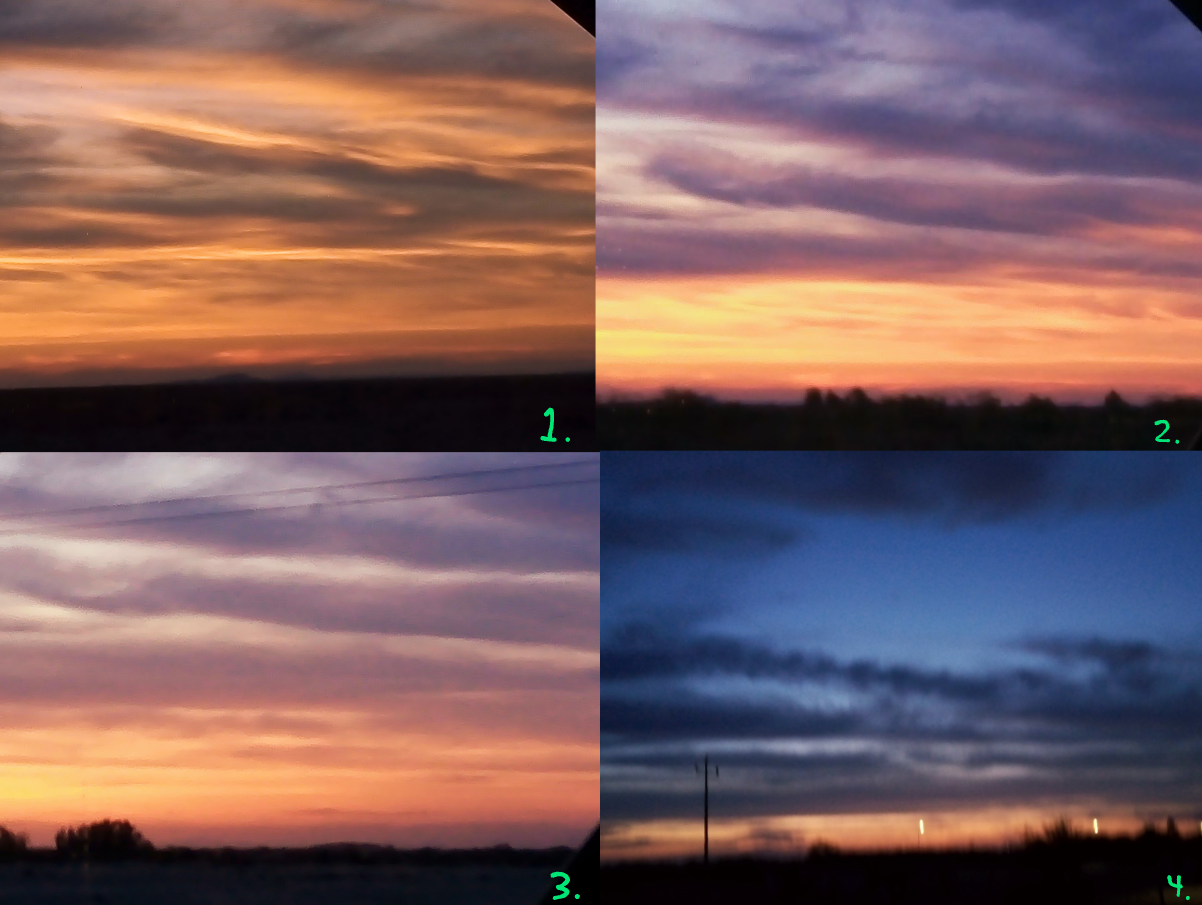
Vivid sunset during the arrival of the Saharan air layer in Northern Mexico

The SAL passes over the Canary Islands where the phenomenon is named "calima" (English: "haze") and manifests as a fog that reduces visibility and deposits a layer of dust over everything. It is especially prevalent in the winter months. Canary islanders suffer respiratory problems during this weather event, and sometimes the dust is so bad that public life and transport halt completely. On January 8, 2002, the dust was so heavy over the Tenerife South Airport, dropping visibility to 50 metres (160 ft), that it was forced to close.

From northern Africa, winds blow twenty percent of dust from a Saharan storm out over the Atlantic Ocean, and twenty percent of that, or four percent of a single storm's dust, reaches all the way to the western Atlantic. The remainder settles out into the ocean or washes out of the air with rainfall. Scientists believe the July 2000 measurements made in Puerto Rico, nearly 8 million tonnes, equaled about one-fifth of the year's total dust deposits.

The clouds of dust SAL creates are visible in satellite photos as a milky white to gray shade, similar to haze.

Findings to date indicate that the iron-rich dust particles that often occur within the SAL reflect solar radiation, thus cooling the atmosphere. The particles also reduce the amount of sunlight reaching the ocean, thus reducing the amount of heating of the ocean. They also tend to increase condensation as they drift into the marine layer below, but not precipitation as the drops formed are too small to fall and tend not to readily coalesce. These tiny drops are subsequently more easily evaporated as they move into drier air laterally or dry air mixes down from the SAL aloft. Research on aerosols also shows that the presence of small particles in air tends to suppress winds. The SAL has also been observed to suppress the development and intensifying of tropical cyclones, which may be related directly to these factors.

== See also ==
- African easterly jet
- Cape Verde hurricane
