= Calima (Saharan sand) =

Calima or Kalima (Saharan sand)

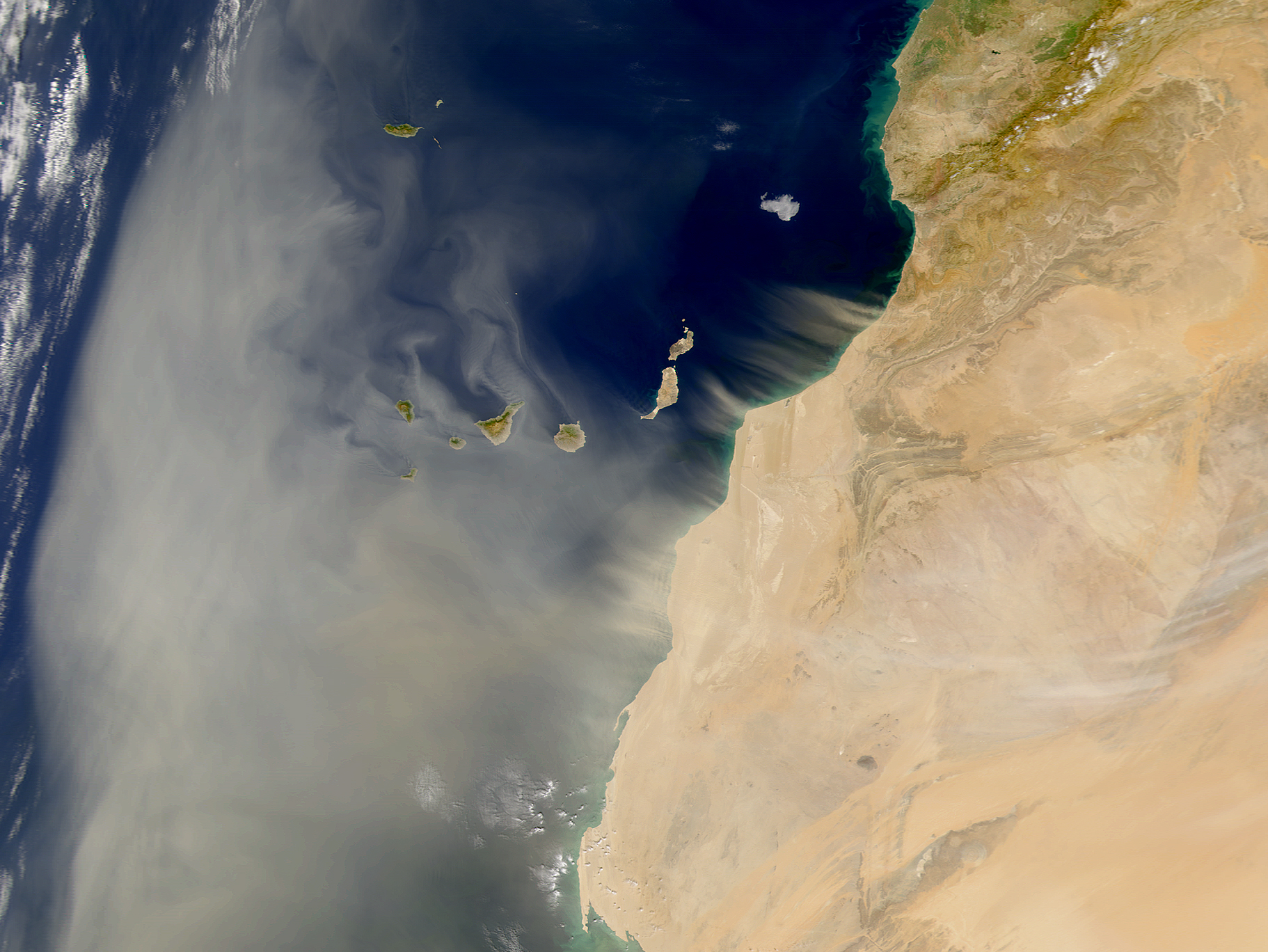
Calima, photo by a satellite

Calima or Kalima is a term used to describe a meteorological phenomenon that occurs when fine sand and dust particles from the Sahara are lifted into the atmosphere and transported by prevailing winds.

It usually happens in the summer and lasts 3–5 days. Record-breaking historical episodes (with PM2.5 and PM10 in Spain and Portugal exceeding WHO safe limits 10-fold or more) have been recorded in the winter and early spring.

== Meteorological causes ==
The primary cause of Kalima is the movement of air masses over the Sahara. The region near the surface in the Sahara undergoes strong warming through heat transfer from the underlying layer. This extreme diurnal warming creates instability in the lowest layer of the atmosphere, warming and drying the air near the surface and cooling while humidifying the air near the top of the layer through convective mixing.

The desert's arid environment causes the soil to become fine and easily lifted by strong winds, such as those associated with the Harmattan or the trade winds. These winds can lift millions of tons of sand and dust into the atmosphere, creating a dense, suspended cloud that can travel thousands of kilometers. Some of clouds of sand reach up to 6,000 meters in altitude. The raised dust can then move in the eastward atmospheric circulation while being captured above a marine inversion as it passes over the ocean, reaching the Canary Islands.

== Effects ==
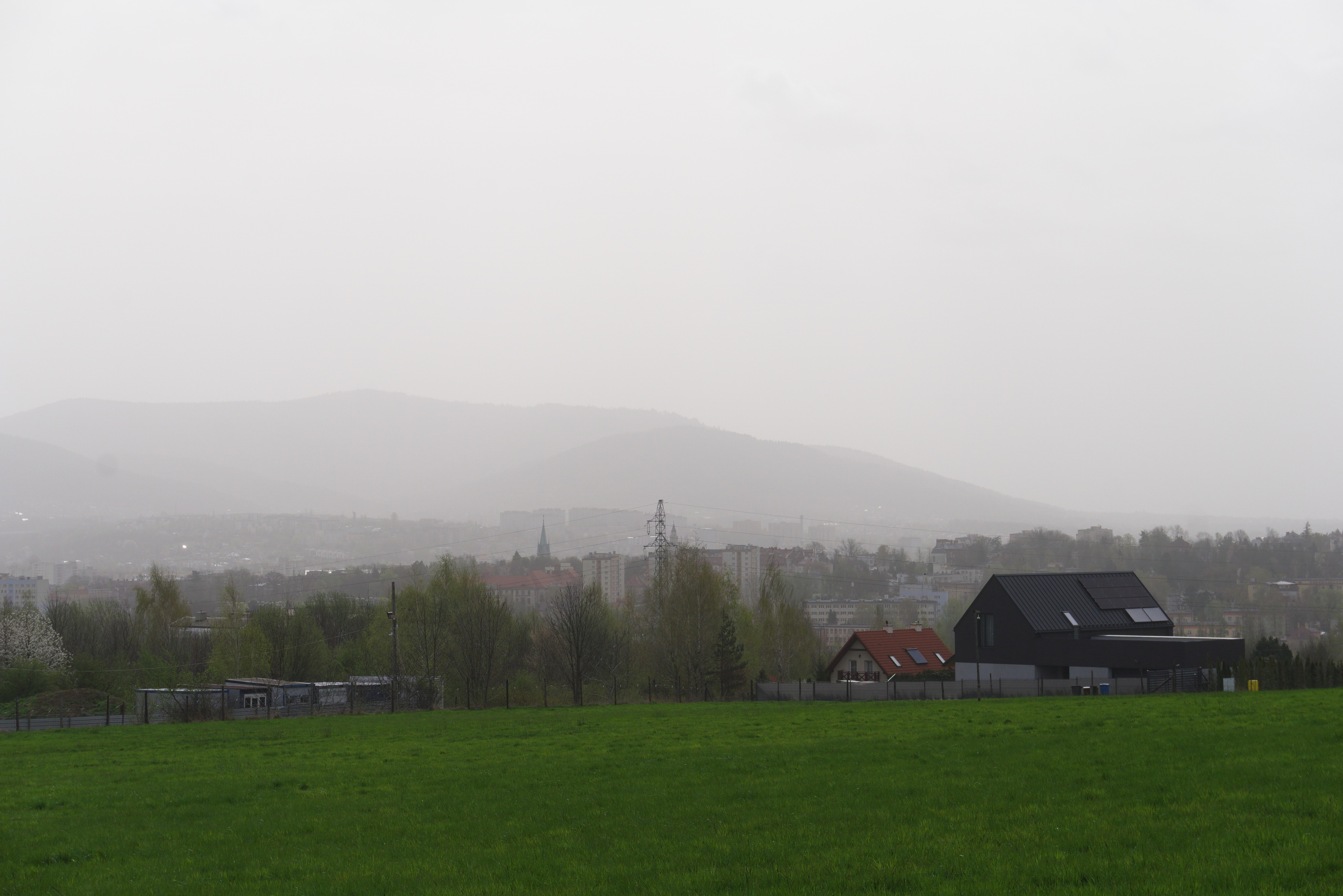
Calima in Bielsko-Biała, Poland (2024)

The humid air in the inversion layer is often associated with fog or drizzle covering the Canary Islands. The dust particles that settle also cause respiratory problems, especially for people with pre-existing respiratory conditions. It is therefore, best for people to wear respiratory masks if they have to go outdoors when there is Calima.

Aside from affecting people's health, when there is Calima, weather conditions can become very poor and force the suspension of some public services, including transportation. For example, on January 8, 2002, the Tenerife North Airport had to be closed because visibility fell to less than 50 meters.

In 2020 the wind spread three wildfires, forcing about 2,000 residents to evacuate in Tenerife and Gran Canaria. Gran Canaria had the worst air quality in the world that weekend due to the dust, with about 40 times the particle density considered safe by the World Health Organization. This resulted in 745 flights being canceled and 84 others diverting to different airports.

Calima also affects other countries such as Spain and Portugal, Malta, Italy (especially Sicily), and Greece (especially Crete) mostly during the spring months when strong southerly winds bring Saharan dust over the Mediterranean.
