= Boris Ruchyov =

Boris Aleksandrovich Ruchyov
- Борис Александрович Ручьёв
- Born: Boris Aleksandrovich Krivoshchyokov; 15 June [O.S. 2 June] 1913; Troitsk, Troitsky Uyezd, Orenburg Governorate, Russian Empire (now Chelyabinsk Oblast, Russian Federation)
- Died: 24 October 1973 (aged 60); Magnitogorsk, Chelyabinsk Oblast, Russian Soviet Federative Socialist Republic, Soviet Union (now Russian Federation)
- Resting place: Magnitogorsk
- Writing career
Notable awards
Order of the October Revolution	Order of the Red Banner of Labour	Order of the Red Banner of Labour
Several others (see below)

Boris Aleksandrovich Ruchyov, real surname Krivoshchyokov (Russian: Бори́с Алекса́ндрович Ручьёв (Кривощёков); 15 June [O.S. 2 June] 1913 – 24 October 1973) was a Soviet and Russian poet, most of whose life and work was related to the city of Magnitogorsk. He is an author of about 30 books of poetry and a recipient of several state awards and decorations.

== Biography ==
Boris Krivoshchyokov was born on June 15 [O.S. June 2] 1913, in Troitsk, Troitsky Uyezd, Orenburg Governorate, Russian Empire. His father, Alexander Ivanovich Krivoshchyokov (1882-1957), was a teacher.

After a not very successful start as a young poet, in 1930 he decides to become a construction worker at Magnitostroy, the constriction trust for the Magnitogorsk Iron and Steel Works. While working there, he continued his poetic works, now at the pen name, Boris Ruchyov. Soon he started gaining recognition. In 1937 he was falsely accused of a counter-revolutionary crime and in 1938 sentenced to 10 years of Gulag labor camps in accordance with Article 58. He served his time in Sevvostlag. He is one of the poets thought to be the author of the "unofficial Gulag anthem", Vaninsky port. After the release he was forbidden to settle in major cities. In 1956 he was rehabilitated, in 1957 he was restored in the rights of a poet and returned to the city of his youth, Magnitogorsk. After a while he became a recognized Soviet poet.

== Honours and awards ==
- Order of the October Revolution (1973)
- Order of the Red Banner of Labour, twice (1963, 1967)
- Maxim Gorky RSFSR State Prize in literature (1967)
- Honorary citizen of Magnitogorsk (1969)
