= Barmaley Fountain =

Fountain in Volgograd, Russia

Coordinates: 48°42′45″N 44°30′49″E

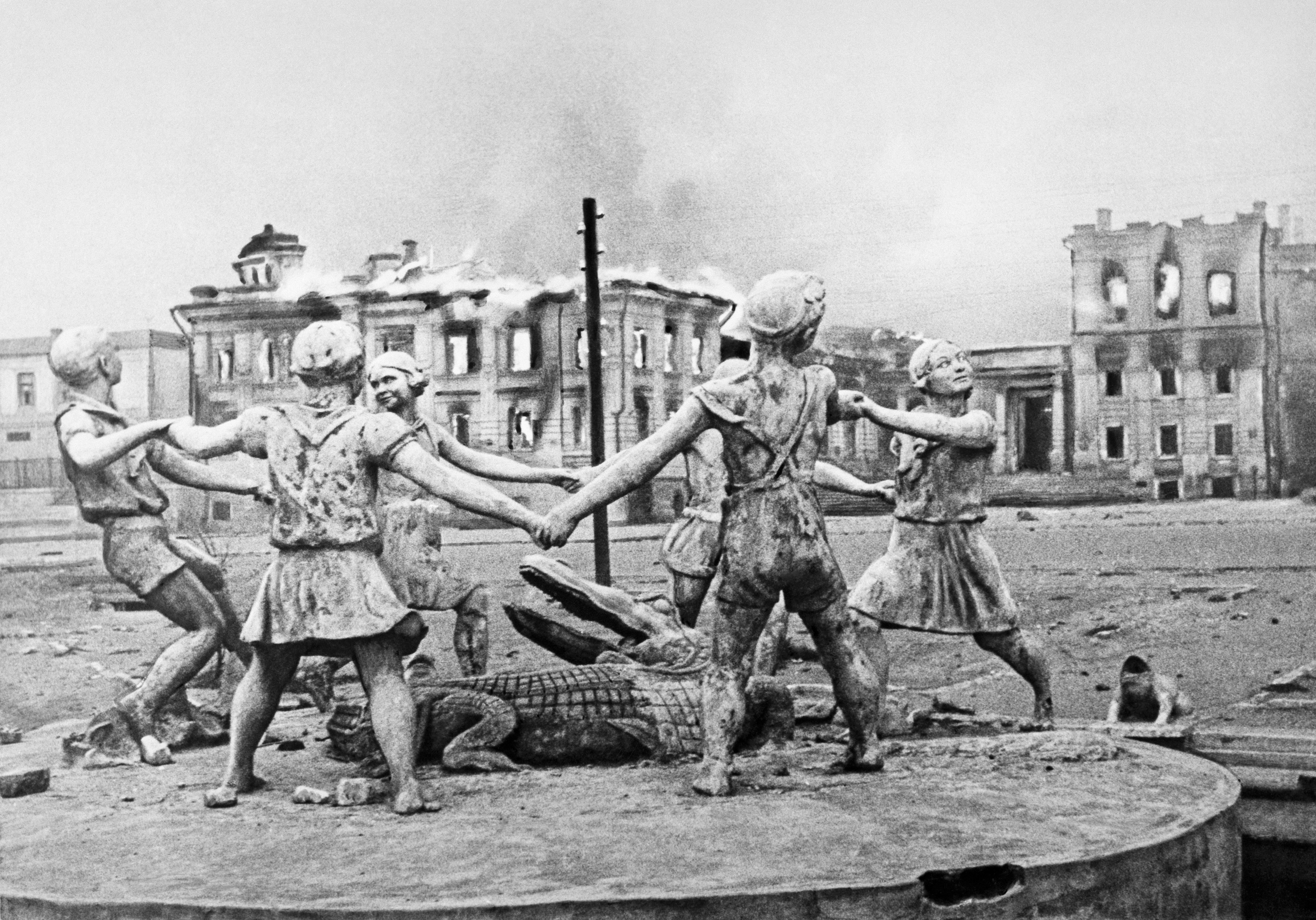
The original fountain after German bombing in August 1942, photographed by Emmanuil Yevzerikhin. In the background are the ruins of the Gryaze-Tsaritsynsky railway station.

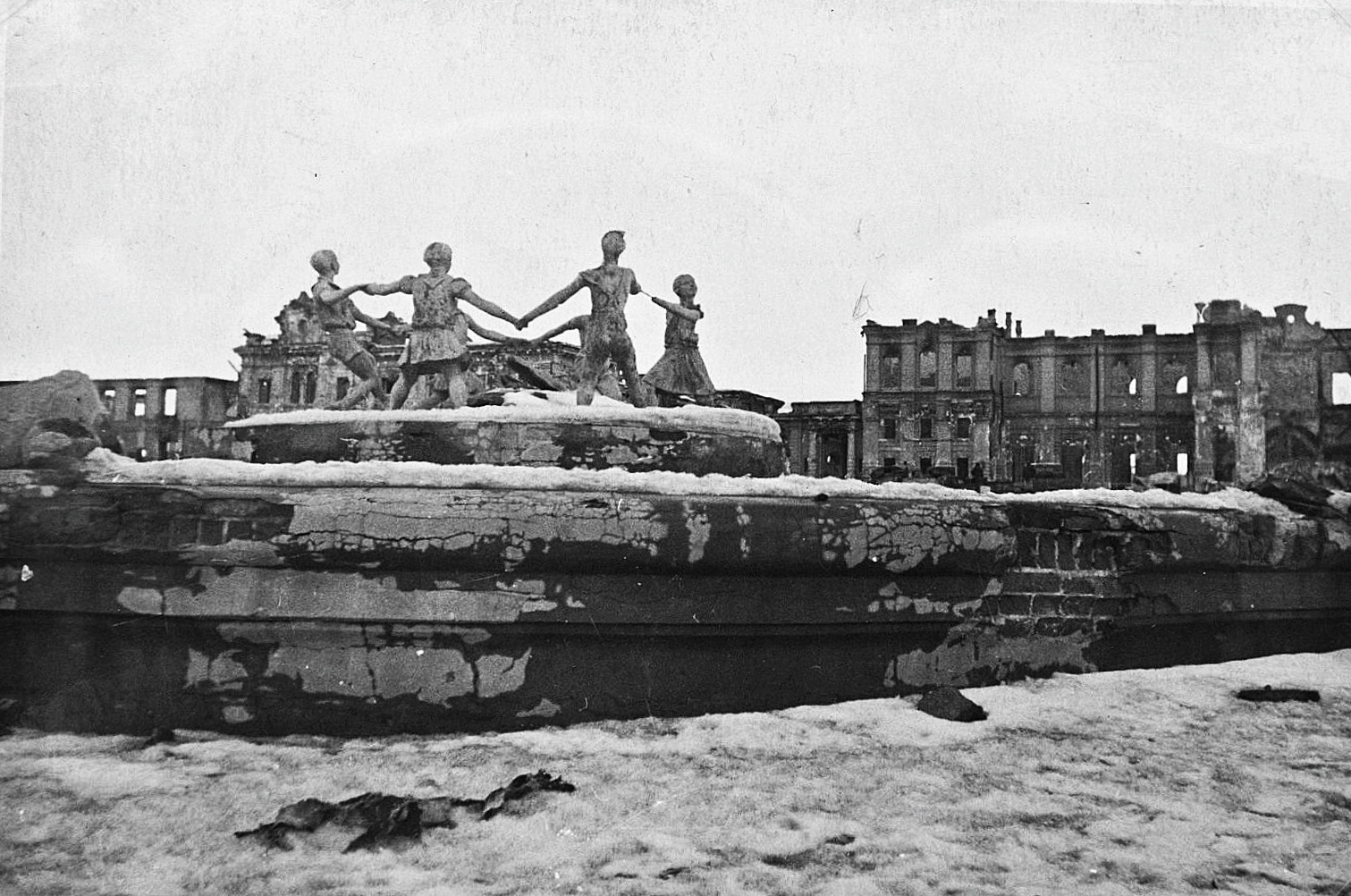
The original fountain in 1943, photographed by Sergey Strunnikov.

The Barmaley (Russian: Бармалей) is an informal name of a fountain in the city of Volgograd (formerly known as Stalingrad). Its official name is Children's Khorovod. The statue is of a circle of six children dancing the khorovod around a crocodile. While the original fountain was removed in the 1950s, two replicas were installed in 2013.

== Name ==
The allegory of the monument was derived from the eponymous fairy tale poem Barmaley written in 1925 by Korney Chukovsky. Excerpt (literal translation):

Little children! / For nothing in the world / Do not go to Africa / Do not go to Africa for a walk! // In Africa, there are sharks, / In Africa, there are gorillas, / In Africa, there are large / Evil crocodiles / They will bite you, / Beat and offend you - // Don't you go, children, / to Africa for a walk / In Africa, there is a robber, / In Africa, there is a villain, / In Africa, there is terrible / Bahr-mah-ley! // He runs about Africa / And eats children - / Nasty, vicious, greedy Barmaley!

While being burned in fire by Barmaley, Doctor Aybolit asked a crocodile brought in by a gorilla to swallow up Barmaley, so that he could no longer harm little children. The crocodile did so, but Barmaley was later released after promising to change. Barmaley became nicer and proclaimed he would be kinder, that he now loved little children and would become a friendly baker.

== History ==
The original fountain is believed to have been installed in the 1930s, when the Soviet Union was being adorned with various outdoor architectural works, including similar fountains designed by sculptor Romuald Iodko, a co-author of the Girl with an Oar, an archetype of the Soviet kitsch. The Barmaley Fountain was made widely known from several August 1942 photographs by Emmanuil Evzerikhin that juxtaposed the carnage of the Battle of Stalingrad with the image of children at play.

The fountain was restored after World War II and was removed in the 1950s.

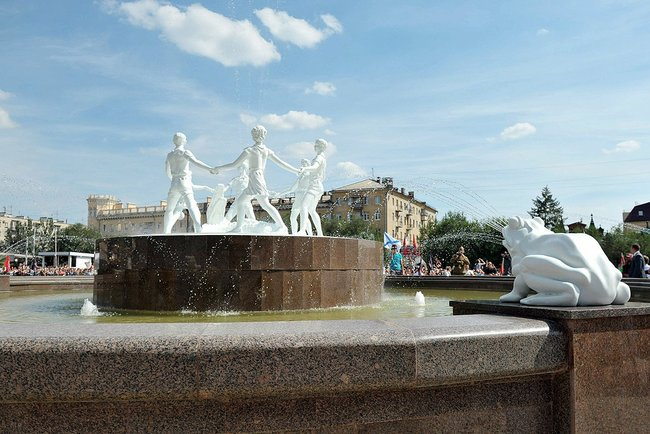
Replica by railway station

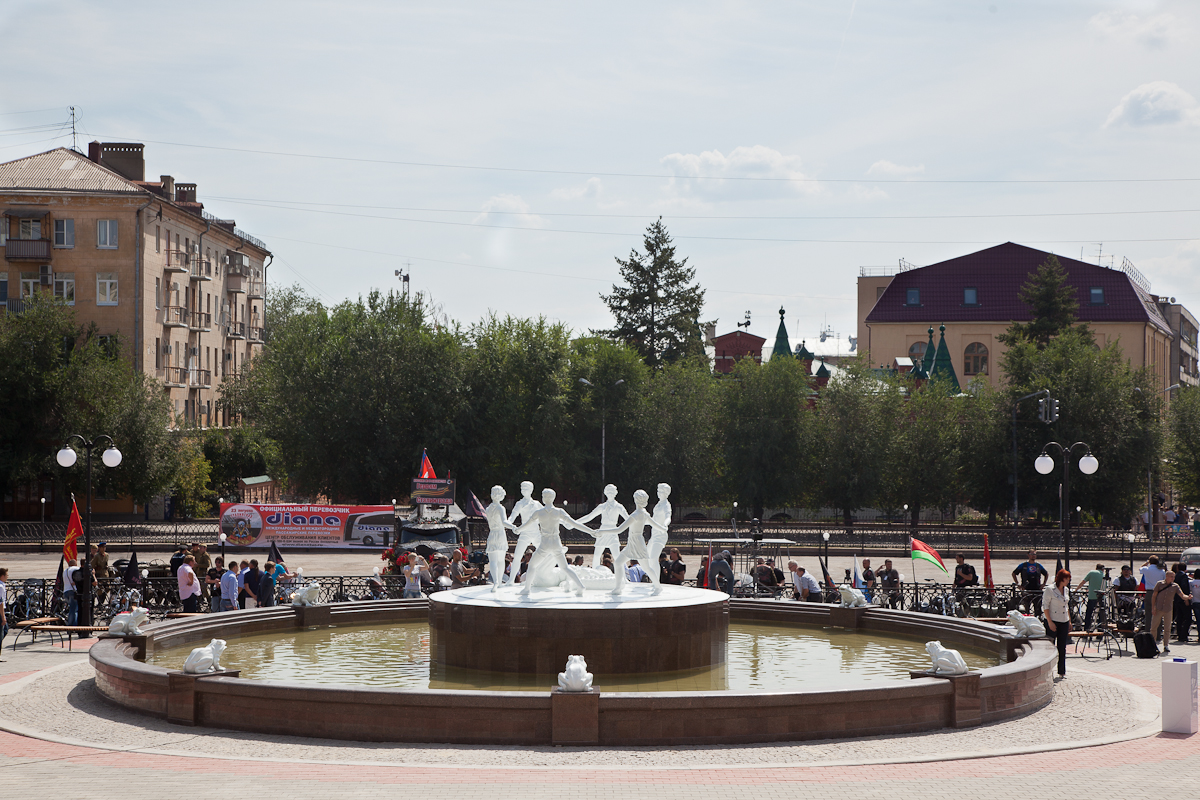

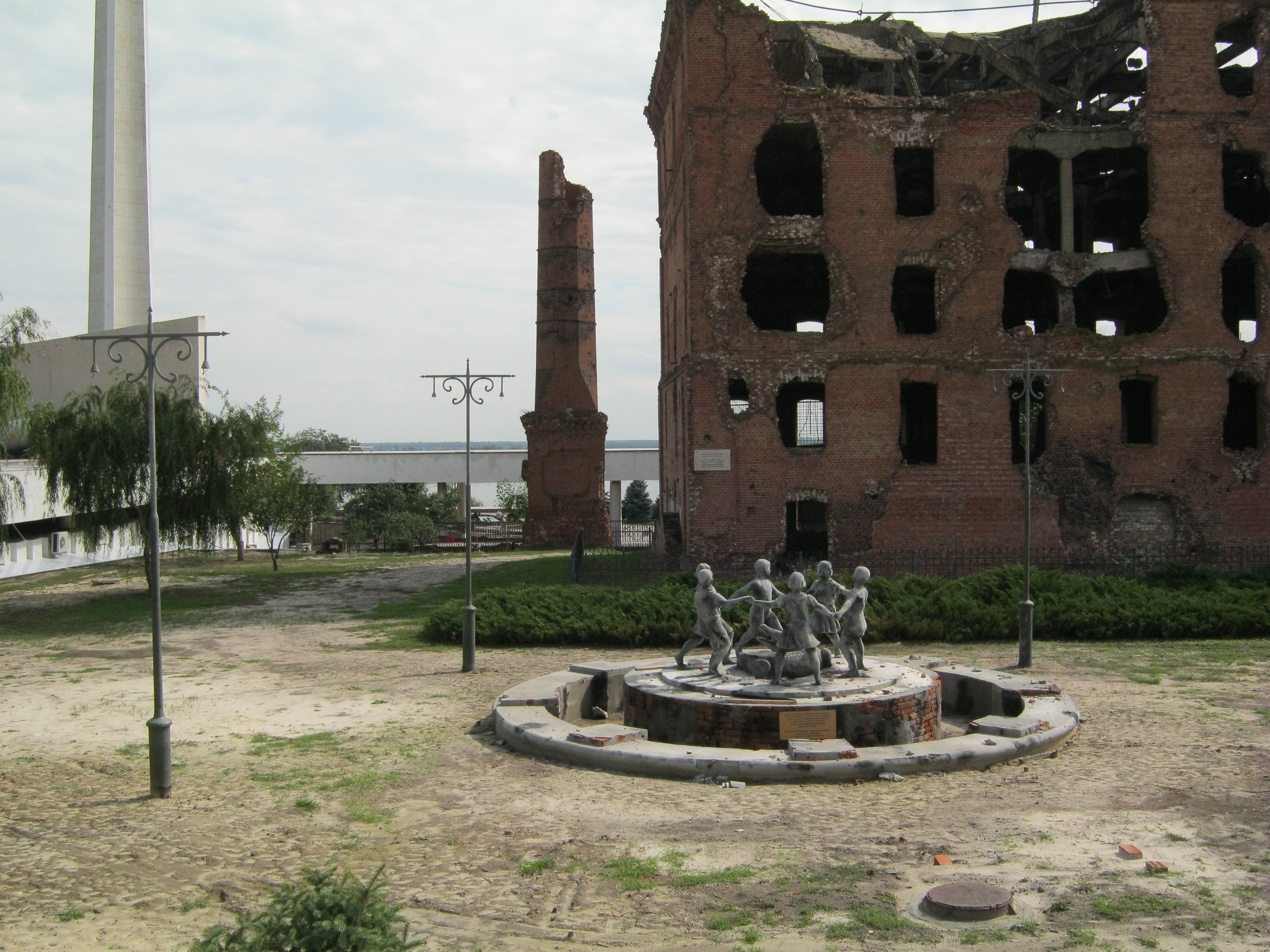
Replica by Gerhardt's Mill

The statue featured in the films Enemy at the Gates, Stalingrad and a similar statue was seen in V for Vendetta. It is also seen in the film A Clockwork Orange, in the documentary footage shown to the main character Alex as part of the sinister aversion therapy to "cure" him of "ultra-violence".

In December 1943, Edith Segal's choreographed work, The Magic Fountain, inspired by the picture of the fountain was held at Carnegie Hall.

This fountain was also featured in various games like Commandos and Company of Heroes 2.
