= Beyesh =

Bashkir folk song

Beyesh (Bashkir: Бейеш) is a Bashkir folk song. The song describes the batyr (a Bashkir folk hero) Beyesh, who fought for the people's rights and hid from the authorities.

== Legend ==
According to legend, in the mid-19th century, when the Bashkirs were transferred from a civilian to a military caste, they took part in the wars and campaigns in Russia, engaged in the construction of fortifications and urban amenities, and assumed provincial Zemstvo duties. Not wanting to bear the weight of military service, Bashkirs deserted. Beyesh and his companions were the runaway soldiers.

To capture them, detachments were formed, but Beyesh and mates Abubakir Abdakov, Kunakbay Abdrahimov, Rahmatullah Barracks, Kurman Ilbakov, and Kutlusha Murzagulov eluded capture for 10 years, from 1838 to 1848. Beyesh stayed in the forests and parishes of the Burzyan and Tamyan volosts, and in the Kagin and Avzyano-Petrovsky Factories in the Verkhneuralsky Uyezd. In 1848, a detachment led by Verkhneuralsk ispravnik Skoryatinov went after the fugitives. After clashes with Beyesh and his supporters, they have finally captured them. In honor of this capture, Skoryatinov was awarded the Order of St. Vladimir IV degree.

The song resembled those of Salawat Yulaev.

Bashkir

Аҡ ҡуянҡайҙарҙан тун тектерҙем,
Тышҡынайын ниҙән тышлайым?
Йәйгелеген бында, ай, йәйләнем,
Ҡышҡынайын ҡайҙа ҡышлайым?

Елә лә генә елә берәү килә
Арҡаларҙан йоморо юл менән.
Күрмәнеләр мине, ай, күҙ менән,
Тик һөйләйҙәр шелтәле һүҙ менән.

Күк ат ҡына ектем, ай, тәртәгә,
Ҡалғандары ҡалды кәртәлә,
Уңлы ғына һуллы ҡашым тарта,
Ниҙәр булыр икән иртәгә?

Ирәндеккәй буйы, ай, күк таштыр,
Кемгә төйәк түгел ул таштар.
Ҡурҡыуҙы ла белмәй ҡыйыу йөрөнөк,
Ни күрһә лә күрер был баштар.

Translit

Aq quyanqayźarźan tun tekterźem,
Tışqınayın niźӓn tışlayım?
Yӓygelegen bında, ay, yӓylӓnem,
Qışqınayın qayźa qışlayım?

Elӓ lӓ genӓ elӓ berӓw kilӓ
Arqalarźan yomoro yul menӓn.
Kürmӓnelӓr mine, ay, küź menӓn,
Tik höylӓyźӓr şeltӓle hüź menӓn.

Kük at qına yektem, ay, tӓrtӓgӓ,
Qalğandarı qaldı kӓrtӓlӓ,
Uñlı ğına hullı qaşım Tarta
Niźӓr bulır ikӓn irtӓgӓ?

Irӓndekkӓy buyı, ay, kük taştır,
Kemgӓ töyӓk tügel ul Taştar.
Qurqıwźı la belmӓy qıyıw yörönök,
Ni kürhӓ lӓ kürer bıl baştar.

English

White rabbit fur coat stitched me
Outer side than it trimmed?
Summer is here, ah, proletoval,
Winter where winter will be?

Gallop, gallop someone goes
Because of the ridge by a circuitous route.
I did not see, ah, eyes,
Just say condemning words.

Sivuyu horse harnessed, ah, in the shafts,
The rest remained in the pen,
That's right, the left eyebrow twitches,
What will happen tomorrow?

Along Irendyk, ah, blue stones,
This not only shelter these stones.
Fear of not knowing, we boldly go,
What they see, you'll see these heads.
