= Ivan Shadr =

Russian and Soviet artist, sculptor

- Иван Шадр
- Born: Иван Дмитриевич Иванов; Ivan Dmitriyevich Ivanov; 11 February [O.S. 30 January] 1887; Taktashi, Chelyabinsky Uyezd, Orenburg Governorate, Russian Empire (now Mishkinsky District, Kurgan Oblast, Russia)
- Died: 3 April 1941 (aged 54); Moscow, Russian Soviet Federative Socialist Republic, Soviet Union
- Awards: Stalin Prize, 1st class

Ivan Shadr (Russian: Иван Шадр), pseudonym of Ivan Dmitriyevich Ivanov (Russian: Ива́н Дми́триевич Ивано́в; 11 February [O.S. 30 January] 1887 — 3 April 1941) was a Russian-Soviet sculptor and medalist who took his pseudonym after his hometown of Shadrinsk.

== Biography ==
Ivan Ivanov was born on 11 February [O.S. 30 January] 1887, in Taktashi, Chelyabinsky Uyezd, Orenburg Governorate, Russian Empire (now Taktashi, Mishkinsky District, Kurgan Oblast, Russian Federation). His father, Dmitry Yevgrafovich Ivanov (1862-1926), was a carpenter. He worked temporarily in Taktashi.

Shadr studied at the Artistic Industrial School in Yekaterinburg from 1903 to 1907, and from 1907 to 1908 at the Drawing School of the Imperial Society for the Encouragement of the Arts in St Petersburg where the famous Nicholas Roerich was his teacher. He furthered his education under Auguste Rodin and Emile-Antoine Bourdelle in Paris (1910–1911), and in Rome (1911–1912).

From 1914 to 1917, he worked for the film industrialist Aleksandr Khanzhonkov. In 1918, he went to Omsk to take his family to Moscow, but remained in this city until 1921. He gave lectures on art there.

Shadr's early works, such as the project for the Monument to the World's Suffering (1916), were designed according to the principles of Art Nouveau. After the 1917 Revolution he was an active participant in the execution of the Monumental Propaganda Plan, in particular, he sculptured reliefs depicting the Socialist ideological leaders Karl Marx, Karl Liebknecht, and Rosa Luxemburg, as well as some sixteen separate monuments to Vladimir Lenin.

In these years the characteristics of Shadr’s style were consolidated: an elevated, romantic organization of the figures and an emotional, dynamic composition. Among his most famous and characteristic works are sculptures The Cobblestone Is the Weapon of the Proletariat (1927) and Girl with an Oar (1936).

In the 1920s, Shadr together with sculptor Piotr Tayozhny came up with one of the first designs of the Order of Lenin, the highest Soviet award. Shadr also worked for Goznak, including on designing new Soviet money that included the symbols of that time: a worker, a peasant and a Red Army soldier. Those sculptures remarkable for their vigorous and dynamic typical characters can be seen nowadays in the Russian Museum (plaster casts) and in the Tretyakov Gallery (bronze sculptures).

Shadr died in Moscow on 3 April 1941 and in 1952 was awarded the Stalin Prize posthumously. He is buried in Novodevichy Cemetery in Moscow, where his sculptural work can also been seen at the grave of Nadezhda Alliluyeva, the second wife of Stalin, and the grave of theater director Vladimir Nemirovich-Danchenko.

The Cobblestone Is the Weapon of the Proletariat, 1927, bronze, Moscow, State Tretyakov Gallery

== Selected work ==
- The Cobblestone Is the Weapon of the Proletariat, bronze, 1927, multiple versions
- A colossal statue of Lenin at the Zemo-Avchaly Hydroelectric Power Station (ZAGES), near Tbilisi, 1927, removed 1991
- Girl with an Oar, multiple versions created in 1935 and 1936

== Honours and awards ==
- Stalin Prize, 1st class (1952)

== See also ==
- List of Russian artists
