= Vera Voloshina =

Russian partisan

- Native name: Вера Даниловна Волошина
- Born: 30 September 1919
- Died: 29 November 1941 (aged 22)
- Allegiance: Soviet Union
- Branch: Military intelligence
- Rank: Private
- Battles / wars: World War II (executed)
- Awards: Hero of the Russian Federation

Vera Danilovna Voloshina (Russian: Вера Даниловна Волошина; 30 September 1919 – 29 November 1941) was a Russian partisan who after joining the Red Army took part in subversive activities against the Nazis in World War II. After being ambushed by the Germans in November 1941, she was brutally hanged near the village of Golovkovo in the Naro-Fominsky District to the southwest of Moscow. According to legend, she was also the model behind Ivan Shadr's Girl with an Oar sculpture in Moscow's Gorky Park. In 1994, Voloshina was honoured posthumously as a Heroine of the Russian Federation.

== Biography ==
The daughter of a miner and a schoolteacher, Vera Voloshina was born in the Siberian city of Kemerovo on 30 September 1919. After doing well in sports at school there, she moved to Moscow after the tenth grade. From 1936, she studied at the State Institute of Physical Education. While in Moscow, she attended the Aero Club where she practised parachute jumping and piloted a Polikarpov I-153 fighter plane. She attempted unsuccessfully to go to Spain to fight in the Spanish Civil War.

According to several accounts, the Soviet sculptor Ivan Shadr persuaded Voloshina to pose as a model for his 12-meter nude statue of the Girl with an Oar which was unveiled in Gorky Park in 1935.

Voloshina began to train at a sports institute but had to leave after experiencing serious health problems. Instead, she joined the Institute of Cooperation, completing her third year in 1941 before the outbreak of World War II. In the summer of 1941, she helped to dig trenches and anti-tank ditches around Moscow.

On joining the Red Army, she was assigned to Unit 9903 of the intelligence division, operating behind the German lines. After participating in several successful raids, she was involved in sabotage work on the front when she was seriously injured near Naro-Fominsk and taken by the enemy on 21 November 1941. On 29 November, she was hanged by the Germans at Golovkovo Farm. Local residents later reported that she had acted defiantly before her hanging, singing The Internationale and shouting "Farewell, comrades" before she died. Her body was retrieved by the Soviets a week later, after the Germans had retreated. She was finally buried in a mass grave in Kryukovo.

== Awards ==
In connection with the 25th anniversary of the Battle of Moscow, she was posthumously awarded the Order of the Patriotic War, 1st class which was presented to her mother in the Kremlin. In 1994, by decree of the President of the Russian Federation, she was honoured with the title of Heroine of the Russian Federation.

== See also ==
- List of female Heroes of the Russian Federation
