= Petukhi =

Petukhi (Russian: Петухи) is a Russian toponym literally meaning "roosters". It is the name of several rural localities in Russia:

- Petukhi, Altai Krai, a selo in Altai Krai
- Petukhi, Arbazhsky District, a village in Arbazhsky District in Kirov Oblast
- Petukhi, Omutninsky District, a village in Omutninsky District in Kirov Oblast
- Petukhi, Sanchursky District, a village in Sanchursky District in Kirov Oblast
- Petukhi, Kurgan Oblast, a selo in Kurgan Oblast
- Petukhi, Nizhny Novgorod Oblast, a village in Nizhny Novgorod Oblast
- Petukhi, Ilyinsky District, a village in Ilyinsky District in Perm Oblast
- Petukhi, Karagaysky District, a village in Karagaysky District in Perm Oblast
- Petukhi, Pskov Oblast, a village in Pskov Oblast
- Petukhi, Zavyalovsky District, a village in Zavyalovsky District in Udmurtia
- Petukhi, Sharkansky District, a pochinok in Sharkansky District in Udmurtia
