= Vaninsky port =

"Я помню тот Ванинский порт"

Song
- Language: Russian
- English title: "I Remember That Port in Vanino"
- Written: Unknown, possibly 1940s
- Genre: Russian folk song
- Songwriter(s): Unknown, possibly Konstantin Sarakhanov

"Vaninsky Port" or "I Remember That Port in Vanino" (Russian: Я помню тот Ванинский порт) is a popular Russian folk song of the USSR epoch, which is often called an anthem of Soviet GULAG prisoners on Kolyma. Time of writing is unknown. A Kolyma prisoner A.G. Morozov asserted he had heard it in autumn 1947. He dated its writing by 1946–1947 years (the construction of the Vanino port was completed on June 20, 1945). It was attributed and self-attributed to a number of authors, including a repressed poets Nikolay Zabolotsky, Boris Ruchyov and even to executed by shooting in 1938, Boris Kornilov. Alexander Voznesensky suggested the authorship of F.M. Dyomin-Blagoveshchensky. A Magadan littérateur A.M. Biryukov has researched this issue and argued convincingly that its author was Konstantin Sarakhanov, a technical manager of some Magadan mines.

The song is named for the port in the village Vanino, on the Pacific coast of Russia. The Vanino port was a transit point for transportation of deported Gulag prisoners who headed to the Kolyma. At the station and in the port of Vanino prisoners were transferred from trains to ships heading to Magadan - an administrative center of "Dalstroy" and Sevvostlag.

== Lyrics ==
The modern version of the song:

Russian

Я помню тот Ванинский порт
И крик пароходов угрюмый,
Как шли мы по трапу на борт
В холодные мрачные трюмы.

На море спускался туман,
Ревела стихия морская.
Лежал впереди Магадан,
Столица Колымского края.

Не песня, а жалобный крик
Из каждой груди вырывался.
«Прощай навсегда, материк!» —
Хрипел пароход, надрывался.

От качки стонали з/к,
Обнявшись, как родные братья,
И только порой с языка
Срывались глухие проклятья.

Будь проклята ты, Колыма,
Что названа чудной планетой.
Сойдешь поневоле с ума,
Отсюда возврата уж нету.

Пятьсот километров — тайга.
В тайге этой дикие звери.
Машины не ходят туда.
Бредут, спотыкаясь, олени.

Тут смерть подружилась с цингой,
Набиты битком лазареты.
Напрасно и этой весной
Я жду от любимой ответа.

Я знаю: меня ты не ждёшь
И писем моих не читаешь,
Встречать ты меня не придёшь,
А если придёшь — не узнаешь...

Прощай, моя мать и жена!
Прощайте вы, милые дети.
Знать горькую чашу до дна
Придется мне выпить на свете!

Transliteration

Ya pomnyu tot Vaninsky port
I krik parakhodov ugryumy
Kak shli myi po trapu na bort
V kholodnye mrachnye tryumy.

Na more spuskalsya tuman
Revela stikhiya morskaya
Lezhal vperedi Magadan -
Stolitsa Kolymskogo kraya.

Ne pesnya, a zhlobny krik
Iz kazhdoy grudi vyrivalsya.
"Proschay navsegda, materik!" -
Khripel parakhod, nadryvalsya.

Ot kachki stonali Z/K
Obnyavschis', kak rodnye brat'ya,
I tolko poroy s yazyka
Sryvalis' glukhie proklyatiya.

Bud' proklyata ty Kolyma,
Chto prosvana chudnoy planetoy.
Soydyesh po nevole s uma,
Otsyuda vosvrata uzh netu.

Pyatʹsot kilometrov — tayga.
V tayge etoy dikie zveri.
Mashiny ne khodyat tuda.
Bredut, spotykayasʹ, oleni.

Tut smertʹ podruzhilasʹ s tsingoy,
Nabity bitkom lazarety.
Naprasno i etoy vesnoy
YA zhdu ot lyubimoy otveta.

Ya znayu: menya ty ne zhdëshʹ
I pisem moikh ne chitayeshʹ,
Vstrechatʹ ty menya ne pridëshʹ,
A esli pridëshʹ — ne uznayeshʹ...

Proshchay, moya matʹ i zhena!
Proshchayte vy, milyye deti.
Znatʹ gorʹkuyu chashu do dna
Pridetsya mne vypitʹ na svete!

English

I remember that port in Vanino
And the morose shout of steamships,
As we mounted a ladder to board
Into the cold dark holds.

A mist descended to the sea
The maritime elements roared.
Magadan was ahead -
The capital of Kolyma region.

Not a song, but a plaintive cry
Shot up from each breast.
"Goodbye forever, mainland" -
The steamer wheezed, screamed.

The zeks moaned because of the rocking,
Embraced like brothers,
And, just sometimes, muffled curses
Escaped their lips.

May you be damned, Kolyma!
You who are called the marvelous planet
You can go mad against your will,
There is no return from here.

Five hundred kilometers of taiga,
where wild beasts are.
Cars can't reach the place,
only stumbling reindeers wander there.

The death has made friends with scurvy here,
Hospitals are chock full.
And vainly this spring
I wait for an answer from my beloved.

I know you don't wait for me
and you don't read my letters.
You will never come to meet me
and if you did, you wouldn't recognize me.

Farewell, my mother and my wife!
Farewell to you, my dear children.
Clearly, the bitter cup to the dregs
I have to drink in this world!
