= Khairulla Usmanov =

Deputy of the second imperial Duma

Khairulla Usmanov Russian: Хайрулла Усманов
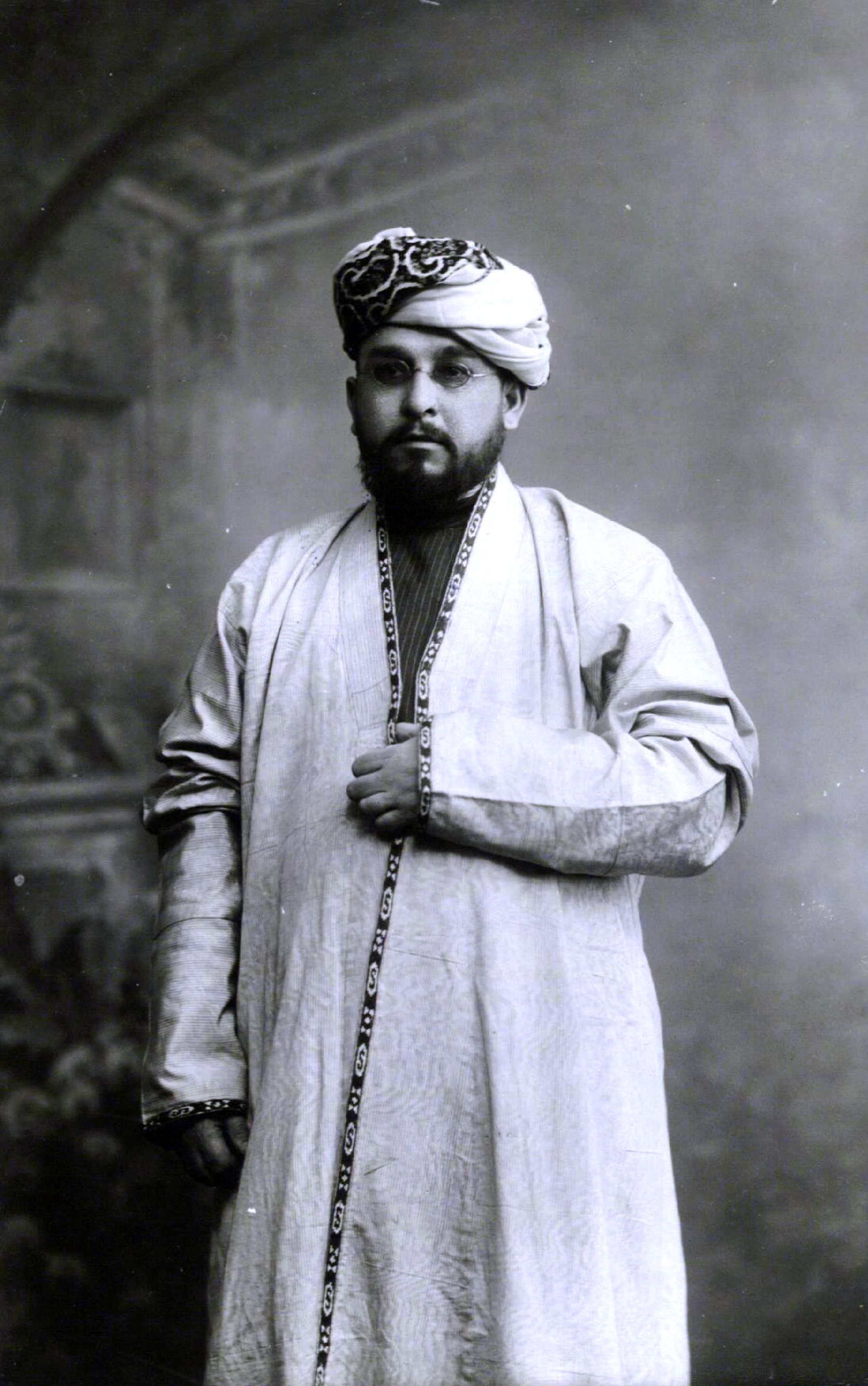
- photo by Karl Bulla (1907)

Deputy of the Second Imperial Duma
- In office 20 February 1907 – 3 June 1907
- Monarch: Nicholas II

Personal details
- Born: Khairulla Abdrakhmanovich Usmanov; 16 December 1866 Orenburg Governorate, Russian Empire
- Died: 14 June 1915 (aged 48) Orenburg, Russian Empire
- Party: Constitutional Democratic Party

Khairulla Abdrakhmanovich Usmanov (Russian: Хайрулла Абдрахманович Усманов; December 16, 1866, Orenburg Governorate — June 14, 1915, Orenburg) was a mullah and deputy of the Second Imperial Duma from the Orenburg Governorate in 1907.

== Literature ==
- Петров Егор Алексеевич (in Russian) // Государственная дума Российской империи: 1906—1917 / Б. Ю. Иванов, А. А. Комзолова, И. С. Ряховская. — Москва: РОССПЭН, 2008. — P. 640. — 735 p. — ISBN 978-5-8243-1031-3.
- Члены Государственной Думы (портреты и биографии). Второй созыв. 1907—1912 гг. / Сост. М. М. Боиович. — Москва, 1907. — P. 217. (in Russian)
