= Petukhi, Kurgan Oblast =

Petukhi Петухи
- Selo
- Location of Petukhi in Kurgan Oblast Petukhi (Russia)
- Coordinates: 55.2°N 63.6°E
- Country: Russia
- Federal subject: Kurgan Oblast
- District: Shumikhinsky District
- Elevation: 171 m (561 ft)

Petukhi (Russian: Петухи) is a rural locality (a selo) in Shumikhinsky District, Kurgan Oblast, Russia. It was part of Trusilovsky Selsoviet until its abolition in 2020.

== Geography ==
Petukhi is located in the forest-steppe zone of western Kurgan Oblast, on the shores of several lakes, including Kamyshnoye, Petukhovo, Mogilnoye and Prodolnoye. It lies about 19 km east-southeast of Shumikha (the district's administrative centre). The elevation of the village is 171 metres above sea level.

== History ==
Before 1917, Petukhi was part of Masleyskaya Volost of Chelyabinsky Uyezd in Orenburg Governorate. The village was also known historically as Petukhovskoye, Sarapulina, Komra, Bydina, Kamyshna, and Pepelushka.

According to the 1926 census, Petukhi consisted of 420 households and served as the administrative centre of Petukhovsky Selsoviet in Mishkinsky District of Chelyabinsk Okrug, Ural Oblast. The population was 2,016 inhabitants.

== Population ==
According to the 1926 census, the population was 2,016, of whom 940 were men and 1,076 women. The population was entirely Russian.

According to the 2002 census, Russians accounted for 93% of the population.
