= Pavel Vopilov =

Deputy of the Second Imperial Duma from Orenburg Governorate

Pavel Vopilov Russian: Павел Вопилов
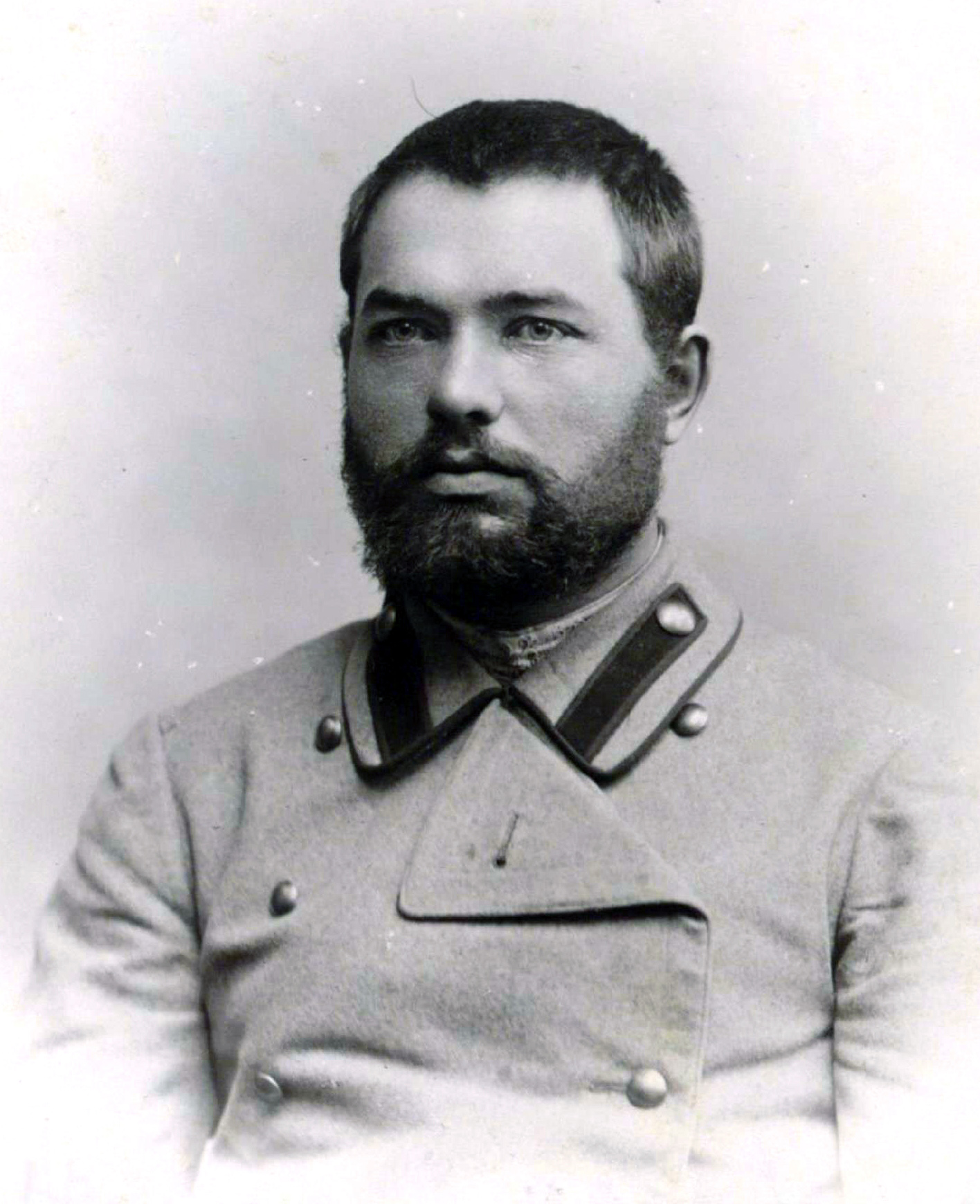
- 1907

Deputy of the Second Imperial Duma
- In office 20 February 1907 – 3 June 1907
- Monarch: Nicholas II

Personal details
- Born: Pavel Petrovich Vopilov; 1875/1878 Orenburg Governorate, Russian Empire
- Died: after June 1907
- Party: Constitutional Democratic Party

Pavel Petrovich Vopilov (Russian: Павел Петрович Вопилов; 1875/1878, in Orenburg Governorate – after June 1907) was a peasant, an awards-winning village teacher and a deputy of the Second Imperial Duma from Orenburg Governorate in 1907. He was considered to have right political views, but joined the Constitutional Democratic Party faction in the Duma.

== Literature ==
- Вопилов Павел Петрович (in Russian) // Государственная дума Российской империи: 1906—1917 / Б. Ю. Иванов, А. А. Комзолова, И. С. Ряховская. — Москва: РОССПЭН, 2008. — P. 103. — 735 p. — ISBN 978-5-8243-1031-3.
- Члены Государственной Думы (портреты и биографии). Второй созыв. 1907—1912 гг. / Сост. М. М. Боиович. — Москва, 1907. — P. 212. (in Russian)
- Вопилов Павел Петрович (in Russian) // Челябинская область: энциклопедия / гл. ред. К. Н. Бочкарёв. — Челябинск: Каменный пояс, 2008. — ISBN 978-5-88771-072-3.
