= Emmanuil Yevzerikhin =

Soviet photographer (1911-1984)

Emmanuil Noevich Yevzerikhin
- Эммануил Ноевич Евзерихин
- Born: 22 July [O.S. 9 July] 1911; Rostov-on-Don, Russian Empire
- Died: 28 March 1984 (aged 72); Moscow, USSR

Emmanuil Noevich Yevzerikhin (Russian: Эммануил Ноевич Евзерихин; 22 July [O.S. 9 July] 1911, Rostov-on-Don – 28 March 1984, Moscow) was a Soviet photographer.

== Biography ==
He was born in 1911 to a Jewish family in Rostov-on-Don. In 1934 he moved to Moscow where he was able to photograph many important people and events of the era for TASS - the congress of the Comintern and the congress of Soviets where the constitution was adopted, constructions, parades, and Arctic expeditions. He photographed Maxim Gorky and Mikhail Kalinin and famous pilots Valery Chkalov and Mikhail Gromov. During World War II he was on a number on fronts but his most famous photographs were taken in Stalingrad. He participated in the liberation of Minsk, Warsaw and Konigsberg. After the war he taught photography and lectured around the country. He died in 1984.
