= Romuald Iodko =

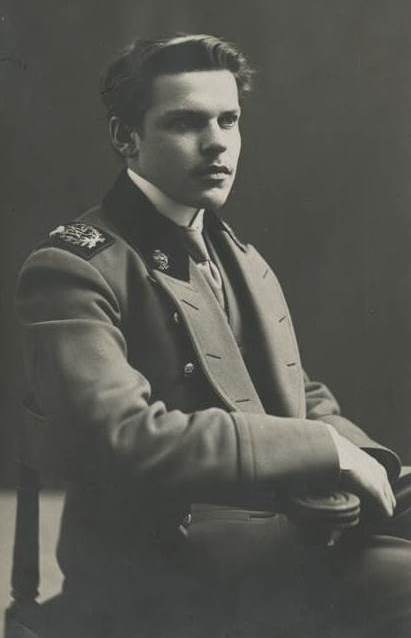
- Iodko in 1916, Moscow
- Born: Romuald Romualdovich Iodko; December 3, 1894; Slutsk, Minsk Governorate, Russian Empire
- Died: November 13, 1974 (aged 79); Moscow, Russian SFSR, Soviet Union
- Education: Imperial Stroganov Central Art and Industrial School (1918); Vkhutemas (1925)
- Known for: Sculpture, visual arts education
- Notable work: Children's Khorovod (1930); Girl with an Oar (1936)
- Movement: Realism

Romuald Romualdovich Iodko (Russian: Ромуальд Ромуальдович Иодко; 3 December 1894 – 13 November 1974) was a Soviet sculptor, known for his works in outdoor sculpture in the style of socialist realism, such as Girl with an Oar and Children's Khorovod fountain; Meritorious Sculptor of the RSFSR.

== Biography ==
Romuald Iodko was born on 3 December 1894 in Slutsk, Minsk Governorate of the Russian Empire, in the family of an artisan. He had a sister, Yelena, and two brothers, Vitold and Adam (1893–1938), the latter was wrongfully executed, but subsequently rehabilitated.

In 1912, Iodko entered the Imperial Stroganov Central Art and Industrial School, where he studied under the mentorship of S.S. Alyoshin, Nikolay Andreyev and E.U. Shishkina, graduating in 1918, and later began to work at the first State Free Art Shops. In 1919, he volunteered in the Red Army during the Russian Civil War, serving until 1921, then he was sent to Vkhutemas to continue his artistic education. Upon graduating in 1925 from Vkhutemas Sculpture Faculty under the supervision of Boris Korolyov, he remained there as an assistant on scientific-methodological and pedagogical work. Since 1926, he had participated in art exhibitions, and also held membership in artist societies, OST (1925–1927) and AKhRR (1928–1932). In 1938, he was the head of the Union of Soviet sculptors, and the chairman of the Moscow Regional Union of Soviet Artists and Sculptors (MOSSKhS).

He mainly dealt with monumental decorative sculpture for parks, embankments, stadiums, public buildings in Moscow and other cities, including Female Swimmer or Leap into the Water (1930), Children's Khorovod (1930) for the fountain, Victory (1935), Female Builder (1937), Girl with an Oar (1936–1937), Miner (1939), and Female Miner (1939). He also created sculptural portraits of Wolfgang Amadeus Mozart (1940), Ageeva (1949), M.F. Stakhanov, and others; indoor sculptures, like Portrait of a Man (1925) and Red Guard (1927).

At the beginning of his academic career, he lectured at the Sculpture Department of Vkhutemas-Vkhutein (1924–30), MAI (1930–41), MKhI (1937–47), and MIPIDI (1949–52); holding a professor title since 1941. In 1952, he started to work at MVKhPU, where he managed the Department of Academic Sculpture from 1963 to 1974. For his achievements, he was awarded the title of Meritorious Worker of Arts of the RSFSR in 1968. Among his pupils were Lev Kerbel, Vladimir Tsigal, and S.D. Shaposhnikov.

He died on 13 November 1974 in Moscow, and was buried at the Vvedenskoye Cemetery.

== Selected work ==
- Sportswoman (Fizkulturnitsa), 1924
- Portrait of a Man (Muzhskoy portret), 1925
- Red Guardsman (Krasnogvardeyets), 1927
- Boy, 1927
- Female Swimmer (Plovchikha) or Jumping into the Water, tinted cement, 1930; also a bronze version of 1932.
- Children's Khorovod, 1930
- Victory, 1935
- Girl with an Oar, 1936 and 1937
- Female Builder (Stroitelnitsa), 1937
- Miner (Gornyak), 1939
- Female Miner (Gornyachka), 1939
- Kolkhoznik, 1950
