= Troitsky District, Chelyabinsk Oblast =

Troitsky District Троицкий район (Russian)
- District
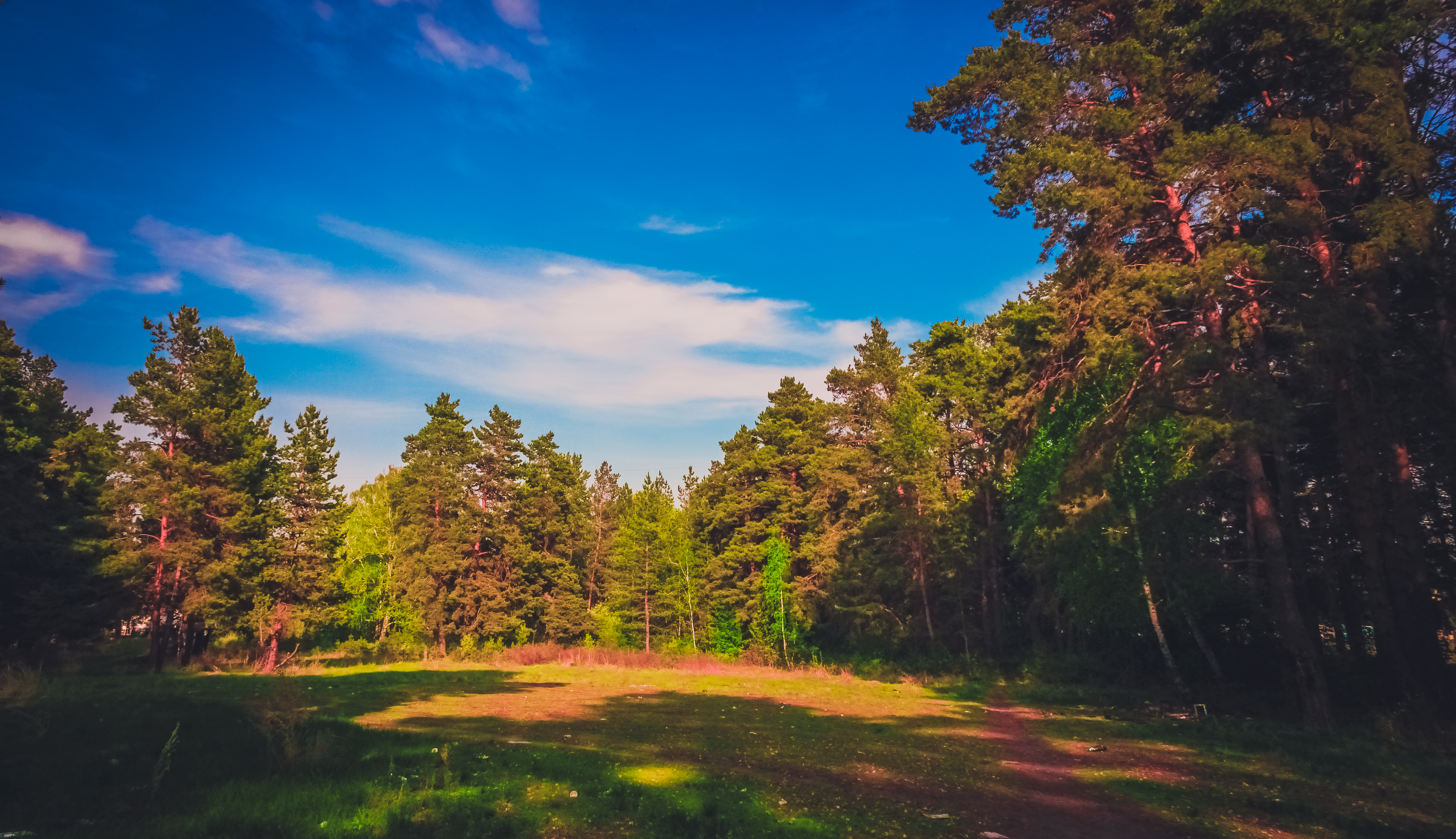
- Golden Hill Forest, Troitsky District

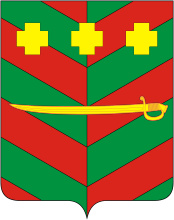
- Flag Coat of arms
- Location of Troitsky District in Chelyabinsk Oblast
- Coordinates: 54°05′N 61°34′E
- Country: Russia
- Federal subject: Chelyabinsk Oblast
- Established: 20 February 1924
- Administrative center: Troitsk

Area
  - Total: 4,591 km^{2} (1,773 sq mi)

Population (2010 Census)
  - Total: 28,059
  - Density: 6.112/km^{2} (15.83/sq mi)
  - Urban: 0%
  - Rural: 100%

Administrative structure
  - Administrative divisions: 14 Selsoviets
  - Inhabited localities: 74 rural localities

Municipal structure
  - Municipally incorporated as: Troitsky Municipal District
  - Municipal divisions: 0 urban settlements, 14 rural settlements
- Time zone: UTC+5 (MSK+2)
- OKTMO ID: 75654000
- Website: http://www.troitsk-rayon.ru

Troitsky District (Russian: Тро́ицкий райо́н) is an administrative and municipal district (raion), one of the twenty-seven in Chelyabinsk Oblast, Russia. It is located in the central and eastern parts of the oblast. The area of the district is 4,591 square kilometers (1,773 sq mi). Its administrative center is the town of Troitsk (which is not administratively a part of the district). Population: 28,059 (2010 census); 33,816 (2002 Census); 34,831 (1989 Soviet census).

== Administrative and municipal status ==
Within the framework of administrative divisions, Troitsky District is one of the twenty-seven in the oblast. The town of Troitsk serves as its administrative center, despite being incorporated separately as an administrative unit with the status equal to that of the districts.

As a municipal division, the district is incorporated as Troitsky Municipal District. The Town of Troitsk is incorporated separately from the district as Troitsky Urban Okrug.
