= Pyotr Tayozhny =

Russian sculptor

- Таёжный (Чешуин), Пётр Иванович
- Born: 1887
- Died: 1952 (aged 64–65)
- Known for: Sculptor

Pyotr (Cheshuin) Tayozhny (Russian: Таёжный (Чешуин), Пётр Иванович) (1887—1952) was a Russian sculptor.

He studied at the Artistic Industrial School in Yekaterinburg together with his close friend and fellow sculptor Ivan Shadr.

Later, he worked with Faberge in Moscow, but then left with his wife and two daughters after being discouraged by the turmoil that followed the 1917 October Revolution. They settled for several years in the Altay region.

His pseyudanym "Tayozhny" comes from those rural years, it originates from the word taiga. I

n the 1920s, after returning to the capital, Pyotr Tayozhny, together with Shadr, was one of the authors of the first designs of the order of Lenin, the highest Soviet award.

He later specialised in miniature pieces for book covers which included Bas-reliefs of Soviet leaders, including Joseph Stalin and writers, Aleksandr Pushkin, Maksim Gorky, Gustave Flaubert, as well as medals, one of them depicting Vladimir Lenin lying in state. The medal is now a collector's item and a good example of the 1920s Soviet cultural propaganda.
