= Doctor Aybolit =

Russian fictional character

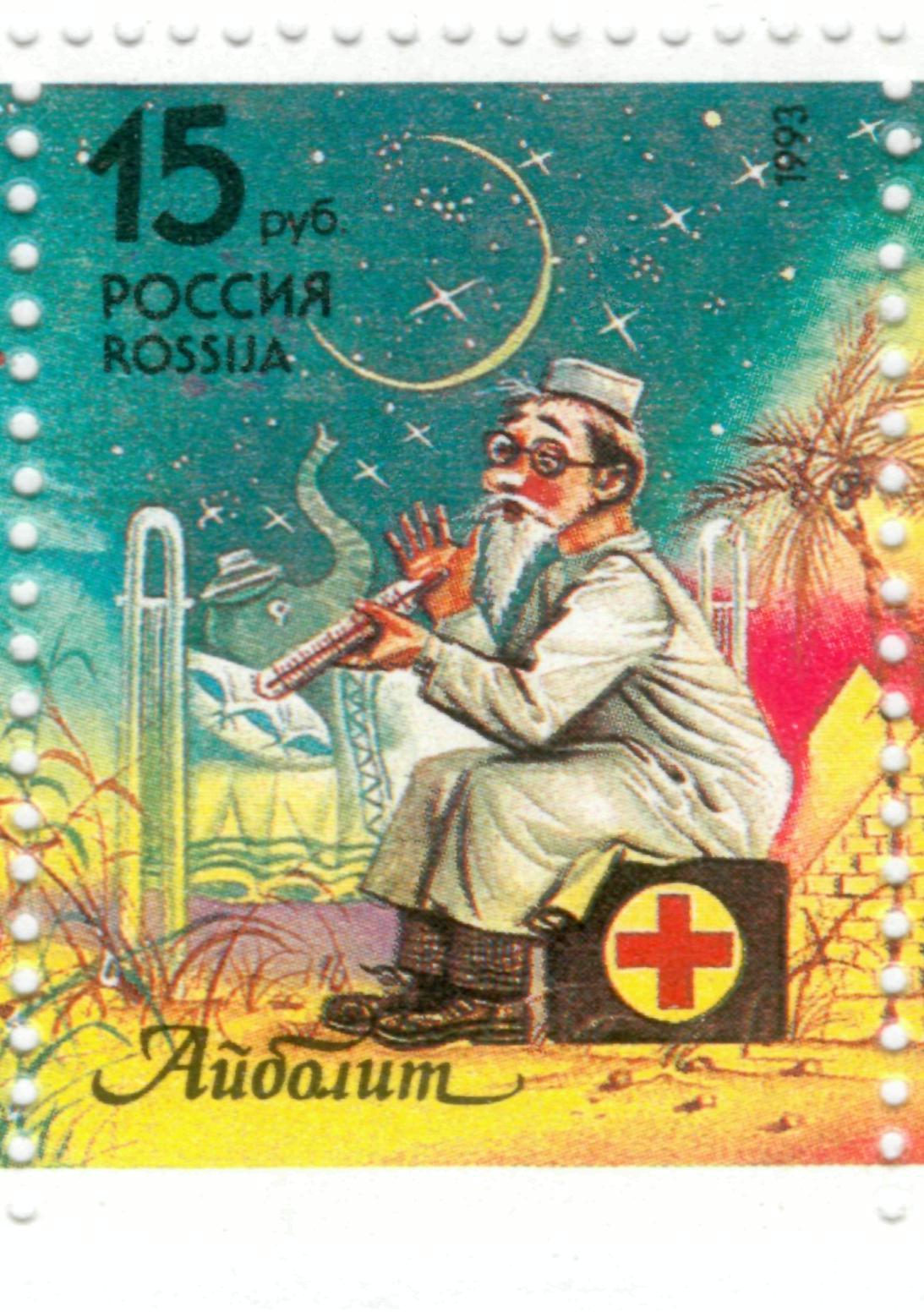
Doctor Aybolit on a 1993 Russian post stamp

Doctor Aybolit (Russian: Доктор Айболит, Doktor Aibolit) is a fictional character from the children's poems Aybolit (1929) and Barmaley (1925) by Korney Chukovsky, as well as from the children's fantastic novella Doctor Aybolit (1925) by the same author. The name may be translated as "Ai" ("Ouch"), "Bolit" ([it] hurts!)".

== Origins ==
Doctor Aybolit is a loose adaptation of Hugh Lofting's 1920 character Doctor Dolittle. The first 1924 edition of Doctor Aybolit was titled "Лофтинг Гью. Доктор Айболит. Для маленьких детей пересказал К. Чуковский" ("Lofting Hugh. Doctor Aybolit. Retold for little children by K. Chukovsky"). In the adaptation the plot was drastically reworked to simplify the perception by little children and this, in addition to accusations in plagiarism, was a subject of "holy wars" in Russian literary circles in 1990s when faithful translations of Doctor Dolittle stories appeared in Russian.

The character was at least partly based on Chukovsky's real life acquaintance, the Vilnian Jewish physician Zemach Shabad (1864–1935), whom he met in 1912. Chukovsky described him in his memoirs as "the nicest man I knew. [...] Children not only visited him themselves, but also brought sick animals." A monument to Zemach Chabad (Note: Monument of a doctor Zemach Shabad and a girl holding a kitten by sculptor Romualdas Kvintas, at the intersection of Mėsinės and Dysna streets (Mėsinių ir Dysnos gatvės) in Vilnius) was dedicated in Vilnius on 16 May 2007. In Lithuanian language, Doctor Aybolit is translated as Daktaras Aiskauda. However the very first Doctor Aybolit book contains a dedication "Посвящаю милому доктору Конухесу (Note: Конухес Григорий Борисович, doctor of Chukovsky's children), целителю моих Чуковлят" ("Dedicated to dear Doctor Konukhes, the healer of my Chukovlings")

== Influence ==
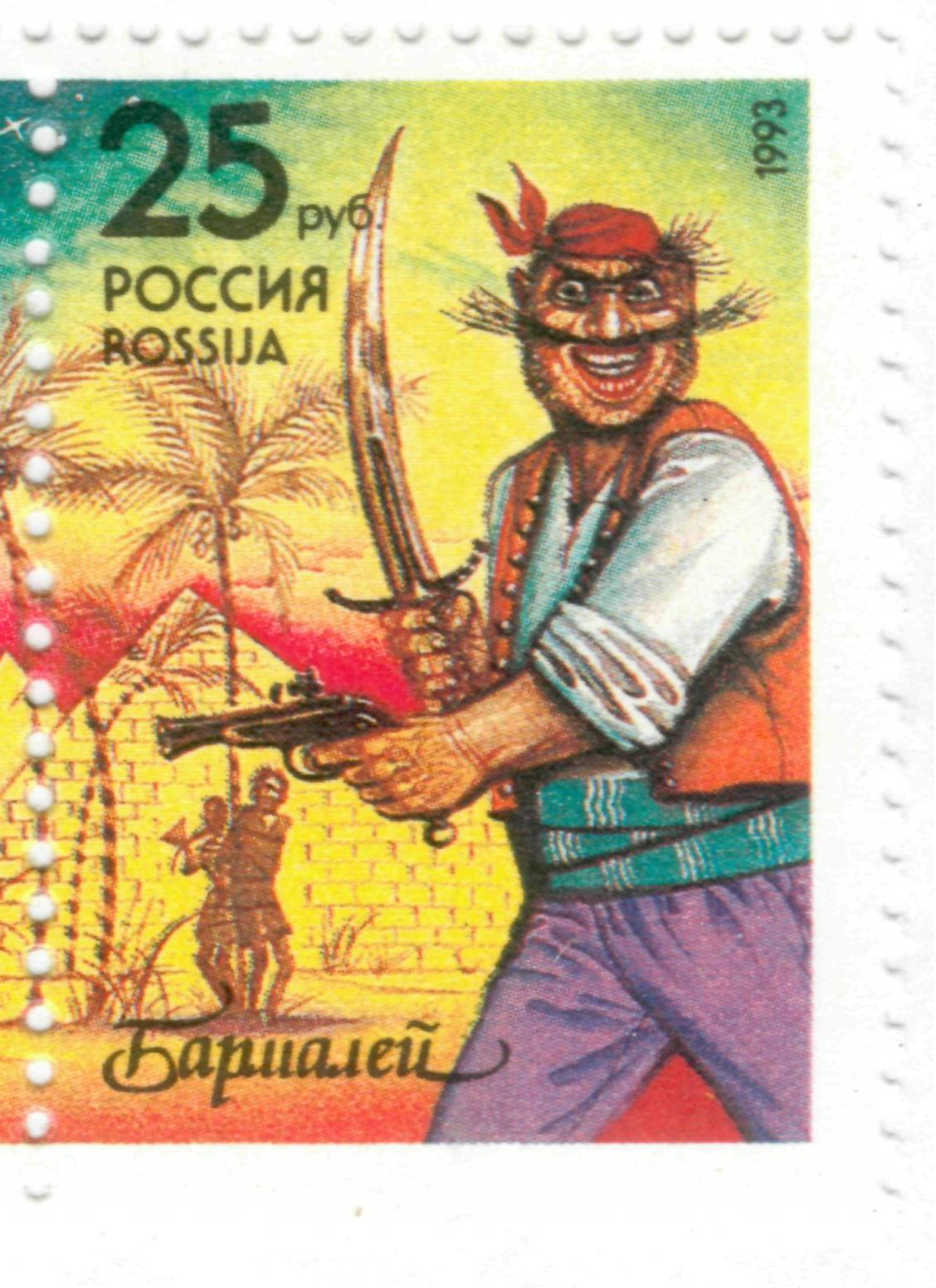
Barmaley on a 1993 Russian post stamp.

The character became a recognizable feature of Russian culture. The poems found their following in the films Doctor Aybolit (black and white, 1938), Aybolit 66 (Mosfilm, 1967, English title: Oh How It Hurts 66), and Doctor Aybolit animated film series (Kievnauchfilm, 1985). The doctor's appearance and name appear in brand names, logos, and slogans of various medical establishments, candies, etc.

Aybolit's antagonist, the evil pirate Barmaley, became an archetypal villain in Russian culture. Barmaley debuted in Chukovsky's book Barmaley in 1925, 13 years before the first film appearance of Aybolit. There is the Barmaley Fountain in Volgograd.

The poems Aybolit and Barmaley generated a number of Russian catchphrases such as "Nu spasibo tebe, Aybolit!" (Thanks to you, Aybolit), "Ne hodite, deti, v Afriku gulyat" (Children, don't go to Africa for a stroll). They were also the inspiration for the Barmaley Fountain in Stalingrad.

In 1967 Richard N. Coe published a loose English adaptation in verse entitled Doctor Concocter. It starts: "Doctor Concocter sits under a tree, He's ever so clever, he has a degree!"

== Monuments ==
Many towns have statues of Doctor Aybolit.

- Monument to Zemach Shabad, the prototype of Doctor Aybolit, in Vilnius, Lithuania,
- In Anapa, Russia
- In Berdyansk, Ukraine
- In Cheremkhovo
- In Irkutsk, Russia, by the veterinary station
- In Kazan
- In Kirov
- in Lukhovitsy, Russia
- In Odessa, Ukraine, 2017
- In Prokopyevsk
- In Ramenskoye, Moscow Oblast, Russia
- In Sibay, Bashkortostan
- In Surgut
- In Tyumen
- In Ulyanovsk, Russia, in the Zavolzhye city district

== Bibliography ==
- Chukovsky, Kornei (1965), Doktor Aibolit, Harrap, p. 79, ISBN 978-0-245-58209-7
- Chukovskiĭ, Korneĭ (1967), Richard N. Coe (ed.), Doctor Concocter, translated by Richard N. Coe, Oxford University Press, p. 24, ISBN 978-0-19-279633-2
- Chukovsky, Kornei (1980), Doctor Powderpill, translated by D. Rottenberg, Central Books Ltd., ISBN 978-0-7147-1468-4
- Chukovskii, Kornei (1980), Doktor Aibolit (in Russian), Znanie Bookstore, ISBN 978-5-88105-113-6
- Chukovsky, Kornei (2004), Doctor Ouch, translated and illustrated by Jan Seabaugh, Smith Publishing, p. 43, ISBN 978-0-9740551-0-7
- Chukovskii, Kornei (2004), Ajbolit (in Russian), Samovar, ISBN 978-5-85066-263-9
- Čukovskij, Kornej (1999), Stichi i skazki: Ot dvuch do pjati (in Russian), Planeta detstva, p. 701, ISBN 978-5-236-00167-0. Extracts of Aybolit and Barmaley.
