= Nikolay Anisimov =

Russian army officer, journalist and politician (1877–1931)

Nikolay Anisimov Russian: Николай Анисимов
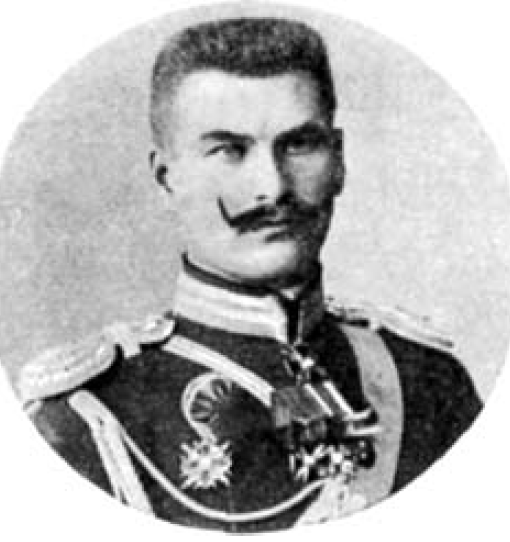
- Born: December 30, 1877; Orenburg Governorate, Russian Empire
- Died: April 8, 1931 (aged 53) Moscow, Russian SFSR, Soviet Union
- Cause of death: Execution by shooting
- Allegiance: Russian Empire (Russia) White Movement
- Branch: Imperial Russian Army (Russia) White Army
- Service years: 1899–1923
- Rank: Major general
- Conflicts: Russo-Japanese War; World War I Russian Civil War

Nikolay Semenovich Anisimov (Russian: Николай Семёнович Анисимов; December 30, 1877 – April 8, 1931) was a major general of the White Army, journalist, representative of the Union of Cossack troops, and candidate to the Russian Constituent Assembly; he was accused of espionage and executed after his return to the USSR.

== Emigration and Return to the USSR ==
After the death of Kolchak, he continued to serve in the armed forces of the Russian Eastern Outskirts under the leadership of Ataman Semenov, where he became an authorized representative of OKW. He was evacuated to Korea (port of Henzan) on the ship "Eldorado". He found himself in exile in Harbin.

In fall 1920, he received from Ataman Semenov 100 thousand rubles in gold to support the Orenburg Cossacks who found themselves in China. In 1921, after the death of the chieftain Dutov, it was N. Anisimov who was elected deputy army chieftain OKV. Arrived in Grodekovo; He was enrolled in food allowance in Vladivostok. During this period, he received at the disposal of about 50 thousand rubles of military equipment. On February 16, 1923, he was removed from his post for embezzlement of the military box office.

On March 20, 1925, the Soviet Consulate General appeared with the ambassador, presenting the ambassador a petition signed by 74 Cossacks. The signatories declared their desire to return to their homeland. On March 29, Consul General of the USSR E.K. Ozarnin, accompanied by Vice Consul Wilde, representative of Vneshtorg Ponomorenko and representatives of the Voluntary Fleet, arrived in Shanghai aboard the Mongugai steamer to raise the Soviet flag. April 5, 1925 N. Anisimov and 240 Cossacks departed from Shanghai to the USSR.

== Life in the Soviet Union and Execution ==
He settled in the USSR in Moscow, where, in 1930, he was in charge of the timber depot at the Central Park of Culture and Rest. He lived on Novoslobodskaya street.

On August 15, 1930, he was arrested and charged with espionage and preparing an armed uprising. On April 3, 1931, he was sentenced by the OGPU College to be shot - in the case of the "Counterrevolutionary Cossack Organization "Cossack Block"", together with other persons.

He was buried at the Vagankovsky cemetery, in a common grave. Rehabilitated "in a special manner" on the basis of the first article of the Decree of the Presidium of the Supreme Soviet of the USSR of January 16, 1989.

== Literature ==
- Ганин, А. В.; Семёнов, В. Г. (2007). "Анисимов Николай Семенович". Офицерский корпус Оренбургского казачьего войска. 1891—1945: Биографический справочник (in Russian). Москва: Русский путь. p. 676. ISBN 978-5-85887-259-7.
- Волков, Е. В. (2003). "Анисимов Николай Семенович". Белые генералы Восточного фронта Гражданской войны: Биографический справочник (in Russian). Москва: Русский путь. p. 239. ISBN 5-85887-169-0.
- Анисимов Николай Семенович (in Russian) // Челябинская область: энциклопедия / гл. ред. К. Н. Бочкарев. — Челябинск: Камен. пояс, 2008.
