= Ufa Viceroyalty =

Viceroyalty of the Russian Empire

Ufa Viceroyalty Уфа наместничество (Russian)
- 1781–1796
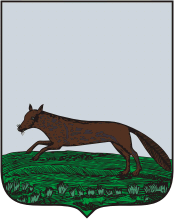
- Coat of arms

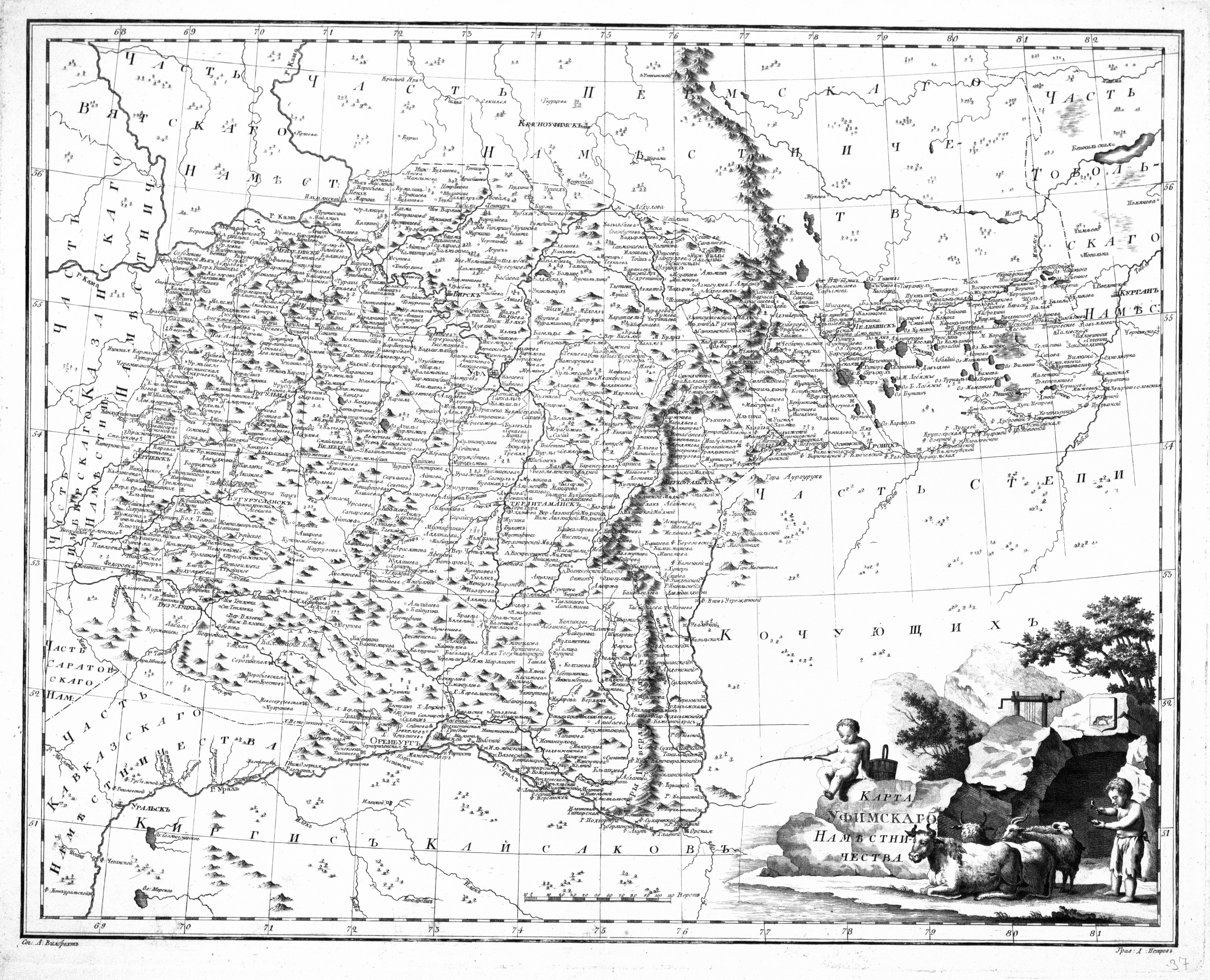
- Capital: Ufa
  - Type: Absolute monarchy
- Historical era: 18th century
  - Creation of Ufa Viceroyalty: 23 December [O.S.] 1781
  - Dissolution, renamed Orenburg Governorate: 12 December [O.S.] 1796
- Today part of: Russia

The Ufa Viceroyalty (Russian: Уфа Наместничество) was a viceroyalty of the Russian Empire, with the largest city being Ufa.

The viceroyalty was created in 1781 which form the lands now known as the Republic of Bashkortostan, a republic within Russia. But in 1796 the Ufa Viceroyalty was renamed to the Orenburg Governorate. It contained the administrative division of Sterlitamaksky Uyzeyd.
