= Troitsk, Chelyabinsk Oblast =

Town in Chelyabinsk Oblast, Russia

Troitsk Троицк
- Town
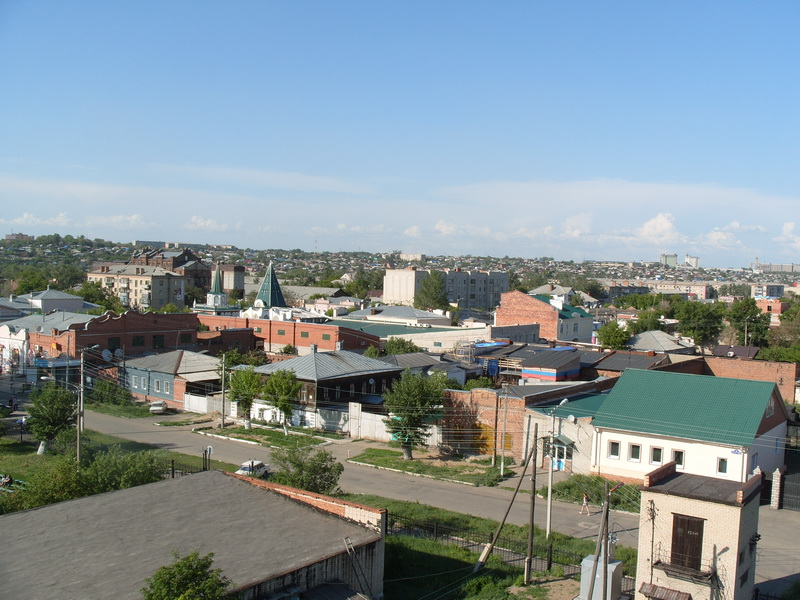
- View of Troitsk

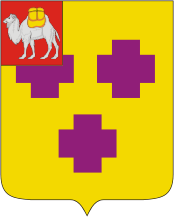
- Flag Coat of arms
- Interactive map of Troitsk
- Location of Troitsk Troitsk (Chelyabinsk Oblast)
- Coordinates: 54°05′05″N 61°33′06″E
- Country: Russia
- Federal subject: Chelyabinsk Oblast
- Founded: 1743

Government
  - Mayor: Gatov Dmitry Vladimirovich
- Elevation: 170 m (560 ft)

Population (2010 Census)
  - Total: 78,372
  - Estimate (2025): 69,471 (−11.4%)
  - Rank: 209th in 2010

Administrative status
  - Subordinated to: Town of Troitsk
  - Capital of: Troitsky District, Town of Troitsk

Municipal status
  - Urban okrug: Troitsky Urban Okrug
  - Capital of: Troitsky Urban Okrug, Troitsky Municipal District
- Time zone: UTC+5 (MSK+2)
- Postal code: 457100
- Dialing code: +7 35163
- OKTMO ID: 75752000001
- Website: troick.su

Troitsk (Russian: Тро́ицк) is a town in Chelyabinsk Oblast, Russia, located 175 kilometers (109 mi) east of the southern Ural Mountains and approximately 110 kilometers (68 mi) south of Chelyabinsk on the border with Kazakhstan. It stands on the east-flowing Uy River, a branch of the Tobol River. Population: 78,372 (2010 census); 83,862 (2002 Census); 90,077 (1989 Soviet census).

== History ==
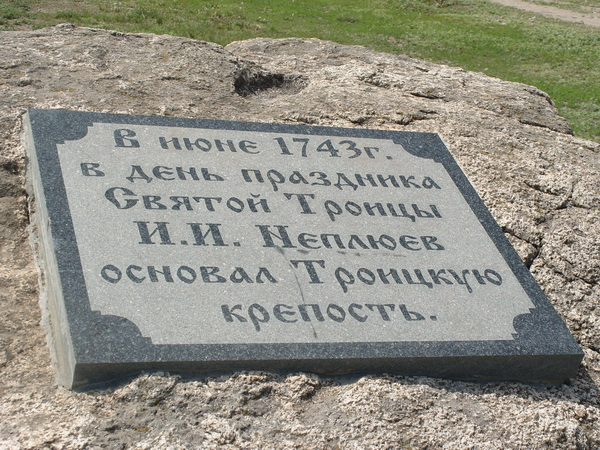
Memorial plaque, with the founding date of Troitsk

Troitsk was founded in 1743 by Ivan Neplyuyev as a head fortress of the Orenburg Line of forts during the Bashkir War of 1735-1740 and to protect the southern borders of Russia. It played a major role in the rebellion of Pugachev, who besieged and captured the town in 1774. Since 1804, it was the seat of the Troitsky Uyezd in the Orenburg Governorate.

The main occupations of the residents were carting and trade. In terms of trade, Troitsk ranked second in the Orenburg Governorate, behind Orenburg. Industry was underdeveloped. In 1873, there were 715 artisans, ten tallow-boiling workshops, nine tanneries, and a tallow candle factory. The city had two mosques, an Orthodox church, a hospital, and boys' and girls' middle schools.

In 1861, the first local school for Kazakh children was founded. In the second half of the 19th century, Troitsk was one of the main centers for the publication of Kazakh books. From 1911 to 1915, the Kazakh magazine Ay Qap was published in Troitsk.

== Population ==
Historical population

Year	Pop.	±%
1870	8,300	—
1897	23,299	+180.7%
1939	46,693	+100.4%
1959	76,325	+63.5%
1970	85,469	+12.0%
1979	87,500	+2.4%

Year	Pop.	±%
1989	90,077	+2.9%
2002	83,862	−6.9%
2010	78,372	−6.5%
2012	78,089	−0.4%
2014	77,176	−1.2%
2015	76,453	−0.9%

== Geography and climate ==
The Uy and Uvelka Rivers merge within the town boundaries and form a water body which serves as a reservoir for the nearby power station.

The landscape around the town is flat, although river valleys are hilly. The town is situated on the border of a forest-steppe zone. The climate is continental. The average temperature in January is −14 °C (7 °F), and +20 °C (68 °F) in July.

Climate data for Troitsk (extremes 1936-present)
Month	Jan	Feb	Mar	Apr	May	Jun	Jul	Aug	Sep	Oct	Nov	Dec	Year
Record high °C (°F)	4.2 (39.6)	5.9 (42.6)	16.0 (60.8)	30.3 (86.5)	36.5 (97.7)	38.4 (101.1)	40.4 (104.7)	39.3 (102.7)	36.6 (97.9)	25.6 (78.1)	15.2 (59.4)	7.9 (46.2)	40.4 (104.7)
Mean daily maximum °C (°F)	−10.0 (14.0)	−8.0 (17.6)	−0.6 (30.9)	11.7 (53.1)	20.8 (69.4)	25.4 (77.7)	26.2 (79.2)	24.5 (76.1)	18.2 (64.8)	9.9 (49.8)	−1.0 (30.2)	−7.9 (17.8)	9.1 (48.4)
Daily mean °C (°F)	−14.5 (5.9)	−13.4 (7.9)	−5.8 (21.6)	5.6 (42.1)	13.9 (57.0)	18.9 (66.0)	20.1 (68.2)	18.2 (64.8)	12.0 (53.6)	4.6 (40.3)	−5.3 (22.5)	−12.2 (10.0)	3.5 (38.3)
Mean daily minimum °C (°F)	−19.0 (−2.2)	−18.4 (−1.1)	−10.7 (12.7)	0.1 (32.2)	7.1 (44.8)	12.4 (54.3)	14.2 (57.6)	12.4 (54.3)	6.5 (43.7)	0.2 (32.4)	−9.1 (15.6)	−16.4 (2.5)	−1.7 (28.9)
Record low °C (°F)	−45.1 (−49.2)	−45.8 (−50.4)	−37.3 (−35.1)	−24.1 (−11.4)	−10.5 (13.1)	−2.0 (28.4)	3.0 (37.4)	0.4 (32.7)	−8.9 (16.0)	−23.3 (−9.9)	−38.4 (−37.1)	−42.9 (−45.2)	−45.8 (−50.4)
Average precipitation mm (inches)	18.9 (0.74)	18.3 (0.72)	21.0 (0.83)	25.1 (0.99)	36.0 (1.42)	45.3 (1.78)	59.0 (2.32)	48.4 (1.91)	27.7 (1.09)	31.2 (1.23)	28.8 (1.13)	28.8 (1.13)	388.5 (15.29)
Source: pogoda.ru.net

== Administrative and municipal status ==
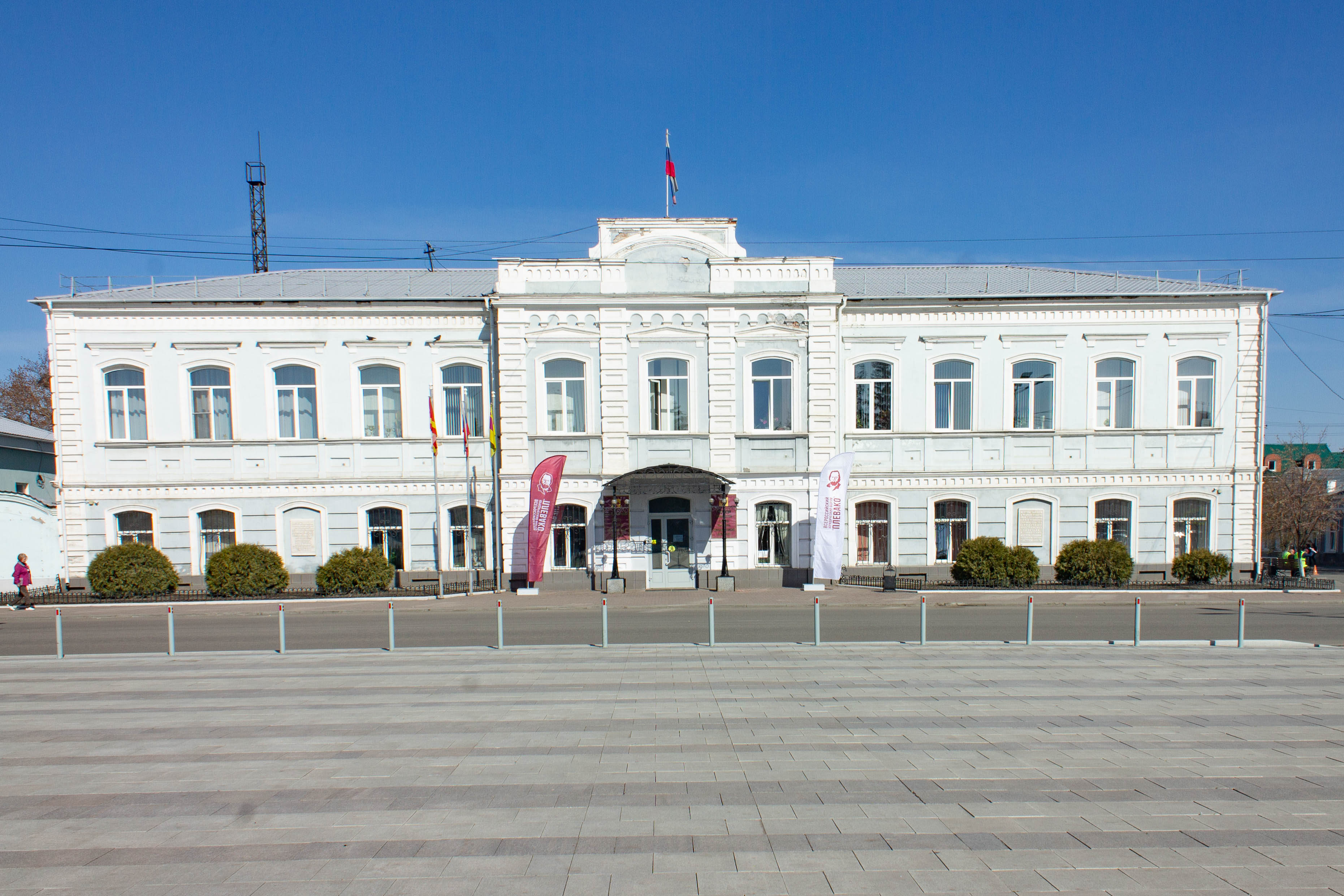
District administration building

Within the framework of administrative divisions, Troitsk serves as the administrative center of Troitsky District, even though it is not a part of it. As an administrative division, it is incorporated separately as the Town of Troitsk—an administrative unit with the status equal to that of the districts. As a municipal division, the Town of Troitsk is incorporated as Troitsky Urban Okrug.

== Economy ==
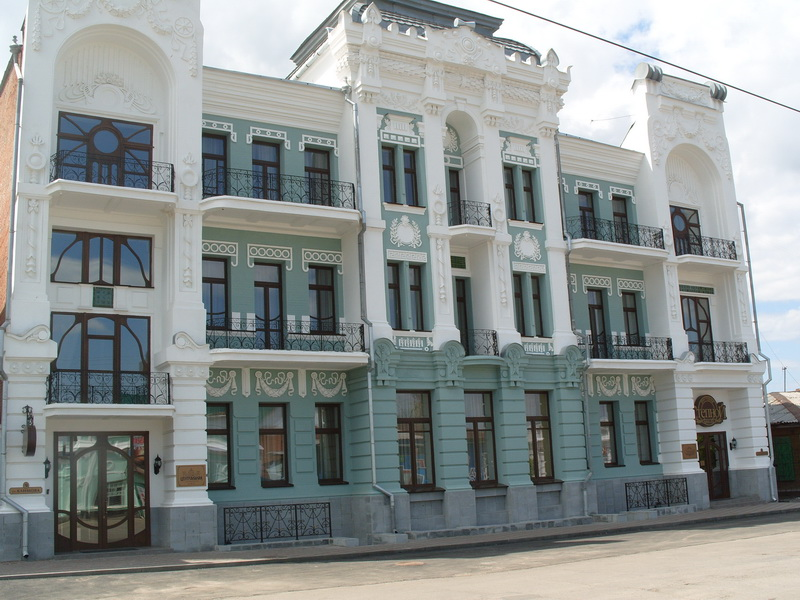
Hotel "Central" was built by the merchant Basharov in 1907

Troitsk serves as a railway junction and a supply and trading center for the southern Ural Mountains mining district. Through Troitsk trains pass to the Republic of Kazakhstan and further to the states of Central Asia. Other lines connect the Ural Mountains with the southern regions of Russia.

Near Troitsk are deposits of clay, sand, quartzite, granite, and rubble, used by the town's construction industry. The Russia-Kazakhstan border is immediately south of Troitsk (see photograph). Several large, cultivated field patterns (elongated, rectangular shapes) are visible through the snow-covered landscape, probably planted with spring wheat. Numerous circular, frozen lakes are scattered throughout the countryside around Troitsk.

The area in the Southern Urals has significant industrial potential. Capacity of the Troitsaya GRES coal-fired power station is around 2000 Megawatts. Additional units with capacity of 660 Megawatt are being built. There is an electromechanical plant which makes heat transfer devices for powerful electric machines, a manufacturer of rockwool plates for Danish firm "Rockwool", a meat-packing plant, ferro-concrete products and parquet, a garment factory, and the railway and motor transportation enterprises. Small-scale businesses employ more than 6000 people.

== Education ==
There are four higher educational institutions in Troitsk. Most significant of them is the Ural State Academy of Veterinary Medicine. About 5,000 students are trained there. Other higher educational institutions have branches in Troitsk.

== Culture ==
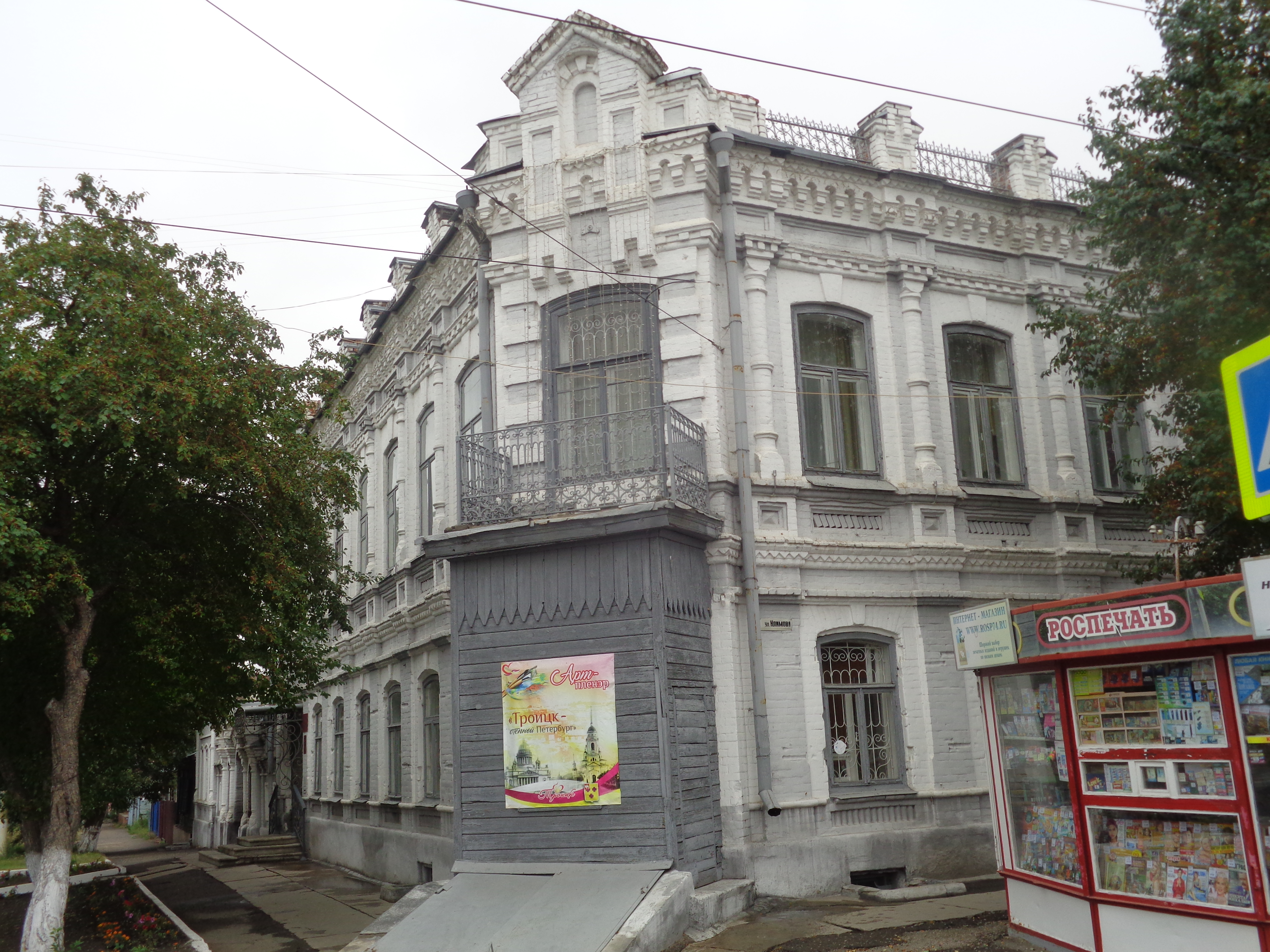
Local historical museum

Various festivals, competitions, and concerts take place during the year.

== Tourism ==
Troitsk is one of the few places in the Ural region where the historical environment is well preserved. There are 948 cultural and historical monuments. The city of Troitsk has 4 architectural sites of federal importance: Cathedral of the Holy Trinity (1754), passage Yausheva brothers Bashkirov hotel and shopping arcades.
