= Girl with an Oar =

Replicated park sculpture in the Soviet Union

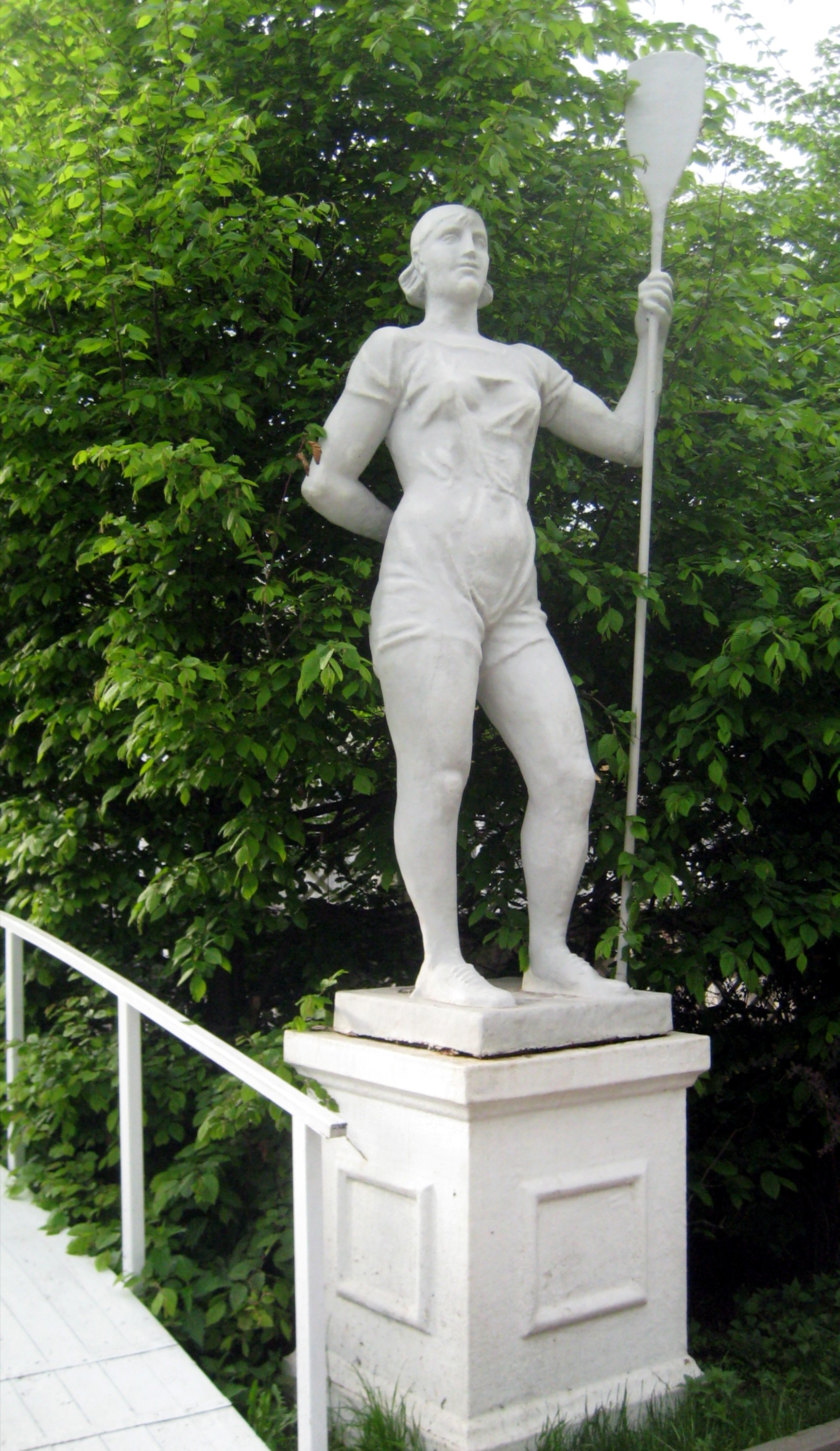
A replica of the Girl with an Oar in Gorky Park, Moscow.

The Girl with an Oar (Russian: Девушка с веслом, romanized: Devushka s veslom) is an archetypal example of Socialist Realism in outdoors architecture of the Soviet Union. Numerous gypsum alabaster versions authored by Ivan Shadr and Romuald Iodko adorned Soviet parks of culture and recreation, and young pioneer camps.

Seen as a symbol of Soviet park sculpture style today, it was part of the monumental propaganda of sports, a model of a healthy person, ubiquitous in Soviet arts of late 1920s–1930s.

The first Girl with an Oar by Shadr was that of a naked girl. It was heavily criticized for being "too vulgar". It was destroyed and known only from a single photo. The second one was naked as well, "more chaste" but still naked. Initially installed in Gorky Park, Moscow, it was criticized as well and eventually "disappeared", and Shadr made another copy to be installed in Luhansk, Ukrainian SSR. The sculpture was destroyed during World War II.

The popular stereotype of the Girl with an Oar is the one in a swimsuit, created by Romuald Iodko.

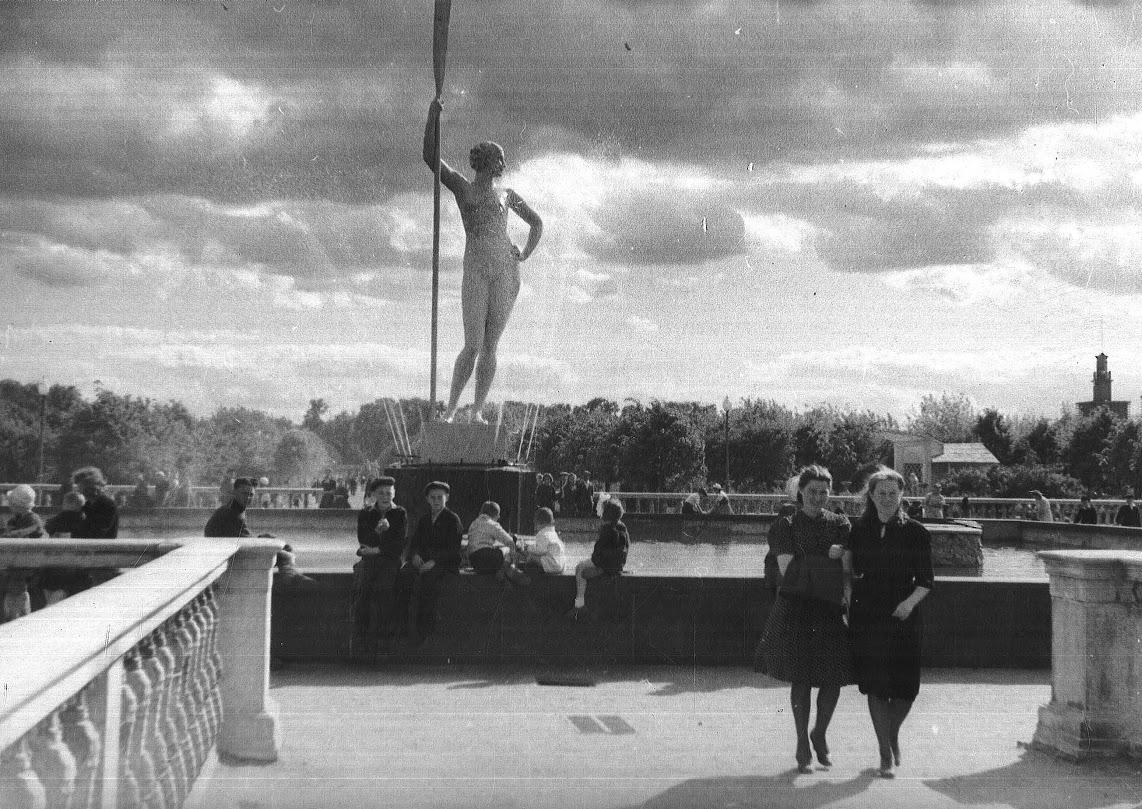
1930s in Gorky Park

In 2011 the reconstructed naked version of the sculpture was reinstalled in Gorky Park.

== See also ==
- Vera Voloshina
