= Verkhneuralsky Uyezd =

The district of the Ufa governorate and the Orenburg province

Verkhneuralsky Uyezd (Верхнеуральский уезд) was one of the subdivisions of the Orenburg Governorate of the Russian Empire. It was situated in the central part of the governorate. Its administrative centre was Verkhneuralsk.

== Demographics ==
At the time of the Russian Empire Census of 1897, Verkhneuralsky Uyezd had a population of 223,245. Of these, 65.5% spoke Russian, 19.7% Bashkir, 12.5% Tatar, 1.3% Mordvin, 0.3% Kalmyk, 0.3% Ukrainian, 0.2% Kazakh and 0.1% German as their native language.
