= Sevvostlag =

System of forced labor camps

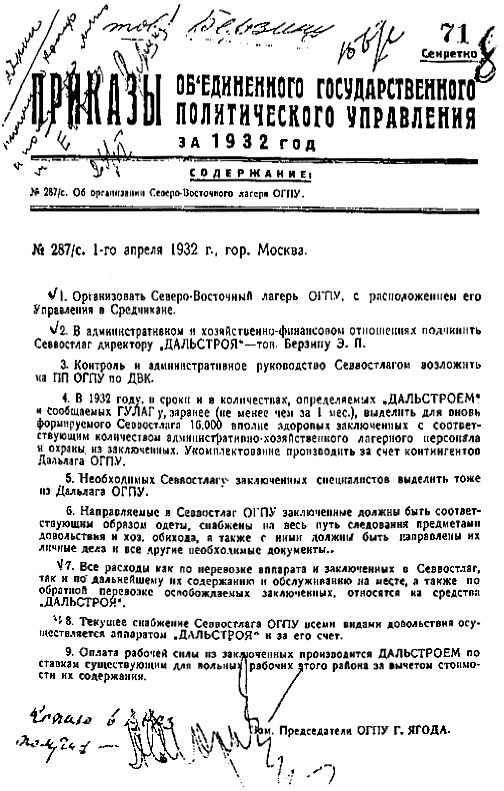
Order to create Sevvostlag forced labour camp, 1 April 1932

Sevvostlag (Russian: Северо-восточные исправительно-трудовые лагеря, Севвостлаг, СВИТЛ, North-Eastern Corrective Labor Camps) was a system of forced labor camps set up to satisfy the workforce requirements of the Dalstroy construction trust in the Kolyma region in April 1932. Organizationally being part of Dalstroy and under the management of the Labor and Defence Council of Sovnarkom, these camps were formally subordinated to OGPU later the NKVD directorate of the Far Eastern Krai. On March 4, 1938, Sevvostlag was resubordinated to the NKVD GULAG. In 1942 it was resubordinated back to Dalstroy. In 1949 it was renamed to the Directorate of Dalstroy Corrective Labor Camps (Управление исправительно-трудовых лагерей Дальстроя). In 1953, after the death of Joseph Stalin, with the reform of the Soviet penal system, it was again resubordinated to Gulag and later reformed into the Directorate of Far Eastern Corrective Labor Camps Управление Северо-восточных исправительно-трудовых лагерей, УСВИТЛ (USVITL).

The inmates served on all Dalstroy projects, the major ones being gold mining and road construction, including the infamous Kolyma Highway.

== Structure and prisoners ==
Sevvostlag was the sole administration for the whole system of the forced labor of Dalstroy. The numerous labor camps usually mentioned for Kolyma and Dalstroy were formally referred to as subcamps ("camp subdivisions", лагерные подразделения) attached (but not subordinated) to the corresponding production units. Until the 1950s the only exceptions were camps on the periphery of Kolyma, which while servicing Dalstroy, were either detached from or attached to Sevostlag at various times.

Prisoners at the Sevvostlag
Year	Number	Year	Number
1932	11,100	1943	99,843
1934	29,659	1944	76,388
1935	36,313	1945	87,335
1936	48,740	1946	69,389
1937	70,414	1947	79,613
1938	90,741	1948	106,893
1939	138,170	1949	108,685
1940	190,309	1950	131,317
1941	179,041	1951	157,001
1942	147,976	1952	170,557
Figures for 1 January for each year. Figure for 1932 for December

From 1945 to 1949 there was a subcamp for Japanese prisoners of war in Magadan, which held 3,479 prisoners by January 1, 1949.

=== Notable inmates ===
- Yevgenia Ginzburg, Russian academic, teacher and author of Journey into the Whirlwind
- Nina Gagen-Torn, Russian poet, writer, historian and ethnographer
- Pavlo Khrystiuk, Ukrainian cooperator, historian, journalist, political activist, and statesman
- Sergei Korolev, lead Soviet rocket engineer and spacecraft designer
- Osip Mandelshtam, poet
- Vladimir Narbut, poet
- Boris Ruchyov, poet (1938–1947)
- Varlam Shalamov, author of the Kolyma Tales
- Thomas Sgovio, American artist, ex-Communist
- Vsevolod Zaderatsky, Russian and Ukrainian composer and pianist

== Management and headquarters ==
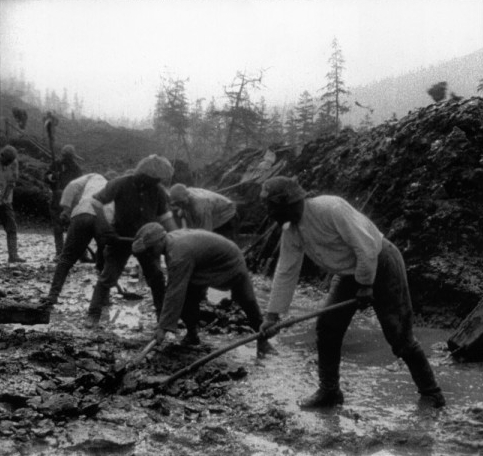
Road construction by inmates of Sevvostlag

The management was initially headquartered in the Srednikan settlement (now Ust-Srednekan, Magadan Oblast). It was moved to the Nagayev Bay, and eventually to Magadan.

Prominent camp officials included:

- Rodion Vaskov (Родион И. Васьков) – (11.03.32 – 09.28.34)
- Ivan Filippov (Иван Г. Филиппов) – captain of state security (09.28.34 – 12.21.37)
- Stepan Garanin (Гаранин, Степан Николаевич) – (12.21.37 – 09.27.38)
- A. Vishnevetsky (А. А. Вишневецкий) – captain of state security (02.16.40 – 02.19.41)
- Yevekl Drabkin (Евекль Иделевич Драбкин) – colonel of state security (05.19.41 – 03.13.45)
- N. Titov (Н.Ф. Титов) – Major General (03.13.45 – 07.27.48)
- A. Derevianko (А. А. Деревянко) – Major General (07.27.48 – 05.03.51)
