= Troitsky Uyezd =

Troitsky Uyezd (Троицкий уезд) was one of the subdivisions of the Orenburg Governorate of the Russian Empire. It was situated in the northeastern part of the governorate. Its administrative centre was Troitsk.

== Demographics ==
At the time of the Russian Empire Census of 1897, Troitsky Uyezd had a population of 201,231. Of these, 82.2% spoke Russian, 7.8% Tatar, 7.4% Bashkir, 1.1% Kazakh, 0.5% Mordvin, 0.4% Ukrainian, 0.1% German, 0.1% Romani, 0.1% Yiddish, 0.1% Kalmyk and 0.1% Polish as their native language.
