= Kaga, Republic of Bashkortostan =

Kaga Кага
- Selo
- Location within Bashkortostan Location within Russia
- Coordinates: 53°31′N 57°41′E
- Country: Russia
- Region: Bashkortostan
- District: Beloretsky District
- Time zone: UTC+5:00

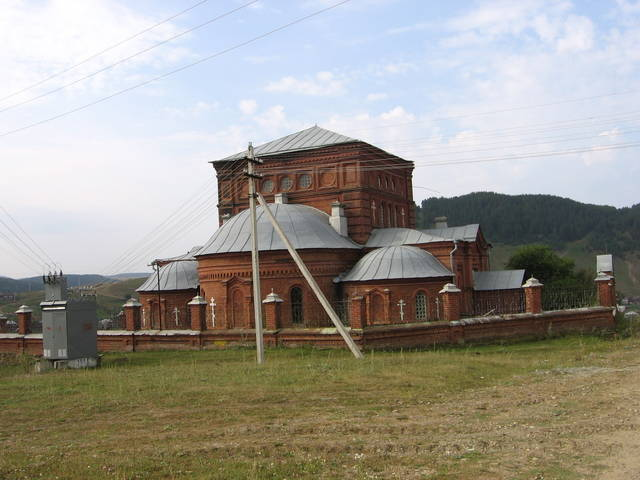
Kaga Church, Bashkortostan

Kaga (Russian: Кага; Bashkir: Ҡағы, Qağı) is a rural locality (a selo) and the administrative centre of Kaginsky Selsoviet, Beloretsky District, Bashkortostan, Russia. The population was 787 as of 2010. There are 26 streets.

== Geography ==
Kaga is located 78 km southwest of Beloretsk (the district's administrative centre) by road. Belsky is the nearest rural locality.
