= Edith Segal =

American poet

Edith Segal (November 11, 1902 – 1997) was a Jewish-American choreographer, dancer, poet and songwriter.

== Early life ==
Born and raised in New York City to immigrant parents, Segal chose to pursue a professional career in dance against the wishes of her mother who called her a “bummarke” (Yiddish for bum). She soon became a dance student of the highly regarded Blanche Talmud, and later earned a scholarship with ballet dancer Michael Mordkin.

== Early career ==
An early supporter of the Soviet Union, in 1929 she formed a dance company known as the Red Dancers. Some of her first works were in tribute to VI Lenin and were performed at a memorial she organized for him. The next year, along with other American artists, she visited the Soviet Union and upon returning declared with the others that "Art is a weapon". During this period she also studied with Martha Graham.

In 1930 she created her best-known work, Black and White, along with Allison Burroughs which was one of the first interracial dance performances in the United States. Black And White has been noted as the signature work in American leftist dance. Other Segal choreographed works on race relations included Scottsboro, Third Degree and Southern Holiday. In addition to civil rights themes, Segal created many dances around Jewish cultural themes as well as worker’s rights, always sympathetic to communist causes. During the Red Scare in the 1950s she was called to testify before the New York state legislature investigating committee regarding her communist ties.

== Later career ==
Retiring as a professional dancer in the late 1930s, Segal became a dance teacher and was active for decades at the progressive Jewish Camp Kinderland. She published numerous books of poetry around progressive themes, often illustrated by her artist husband Samuel Kamen. Well known progressives including Langston Hughes and Dr. Spock praised her writings. She died in New York City in 1997.
