= Chelyabinsky Uyezd =

Subdivision of the Orenburg Governorate of the Russian Empire

Chelyabinsky Uyezd (Челябинский уезд) was one of the subdivisions of the Orenburg Governorate of the Russian Empire. It was situated in the northeastern part of the governorate. Its administrative centre was Chelyabinsk.

== Demographics ==
At the time of the Russian Empire Census of 1897, Chelyabinsky Uyezd had a population of 413,072. Of these, 85.1% spoke Russian, 12.3% Bashkir, 1.5% Tatar, 0.3% Ukrainian, 0.2% Kazakh, 0.1% Mordvin, 0.1% Polish, 0.1% Yiddish, 0.1% Belarusian and 0.1% Komi as their native language.
