= Orenburg Governorate =

1744–1928 unit of Russia

Coordinates: 51.7667°N 55.1000°E

Orenburg Governorate Оренбургская губерния (Russian)
- Governorate of the Russian Empire (1744–1917), Russian Republic, and RSFSR (1917–1928)
- 1744–1928
- Coat of arms

- Location in the Russian Empire
- Capital: Orenburg (1797-1802; 1865-1928); Ufa (1802–1865)
- Area
- 189,727.4 km^{2} (73,254.2 sq mi)
- Population
  - (1897): 1,600,145
- History
  - Established: 15 March 1744
  - Disestablished: 14 May 1928
Preceded by
Ufa Viceroyalty
Succeeded by
Ufa Governorate
Orenburg Krai
Middle Volga Oblast

Orenburg Governorate (Russian: Оренбургская губерния, romanized: Orenburgskaya guberniya) was an administrative-territorial unit (Governorate) of the Russian Empire. Its capital in 1797–1802 and 1865–1928 was Orenburg, and Ufa in 1802–1865.

The governorate was created in 1744 from the lands annexed from Siberian and Astrakhan Governorates. In 1782, the governorate, along with Chelyabinsky Uyezd of Perm Viceroyalty were transformed into Ufa Viceroyalty, which was divided into Ufa and Orenburg Oblasts. In 1796, Ufa Viceroyalty was renamed Orenburg Governorate, and in 1865 it was split in two—a smaller Orenburg Governorate, and Ufa Governorate.

In 1919, Chelyabinsk Governorate was split off from Orenburg Governorate, and in 1928 the governorate was merged into a newly created Middle Volga Oblast.

== Administrative division ==
After the creation of Ufa Governorate in 1865, Orenburg Governorate consisted of the following uyezds (administrative centres in parentheses):

- Verkhneuralsky Uyezd (Verkhneuralsk)
- Orenburgsky Uyezd (Orenburg)
- Orsky Uyezd (Orsk)
- Troitsky Uyezd (Troitsk)
- Chelyabinsky Uyezd (Chelyabinsk)

== Demographics ==
Population by spoken language in Orenburg Governorate (1897)
Language	Native speakers	Percentage
Russian	1,126,040	70.4%
Bashkir	254,561	15.9%
Tatar	92,926	5.8%
Ukrainian	41,541	2.6%
Mordvin	38,403	2.4%
Teptyars	16,877	1.1%
German	5,457	0.3%
Chuvash	5,064	0.3%
Kyrgyz-Kazakh	4,971	0.3%
Mishar	4,898	0.3%
Other languages	9.407	0.6%
Total	1,600,145	100.00

== Notable people ==
- Nikolay Anisimov (1877–1931), major general of the White Army
- Gury Marchuk, (1925–2013) Soviet scientist
- Maurice Tillet, (1903–1954) Russian-French professional wrestler
