= List of urban localities in the Russian Far East =

This is a list of urban localities in the Russian Far East, grouped by federal subject and sorted by population. Administrative centers of federal subjects are listed in bold text. All population figures are estimates as of January 1, 2015.

== Overall ==
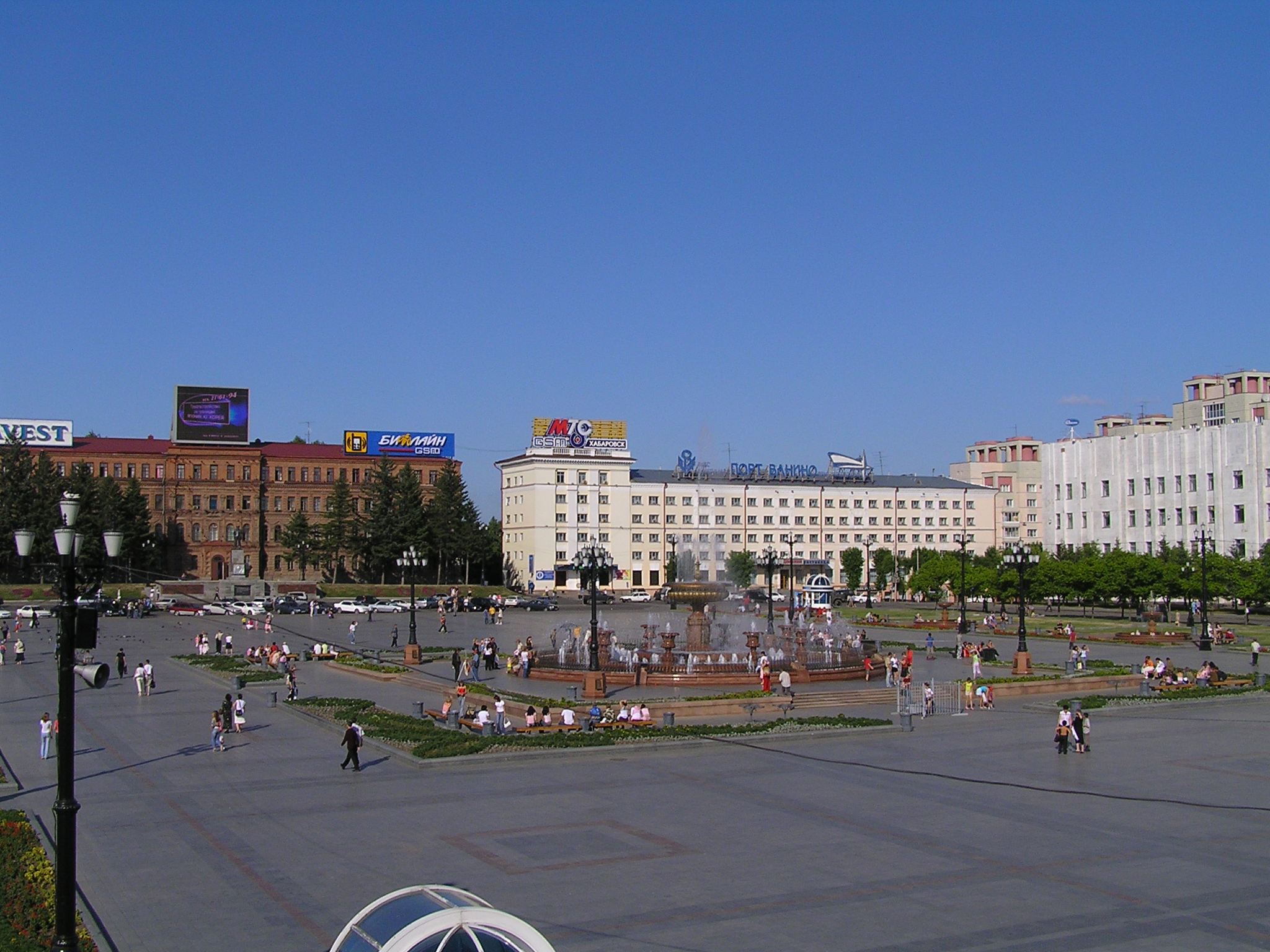
Khabarovsk

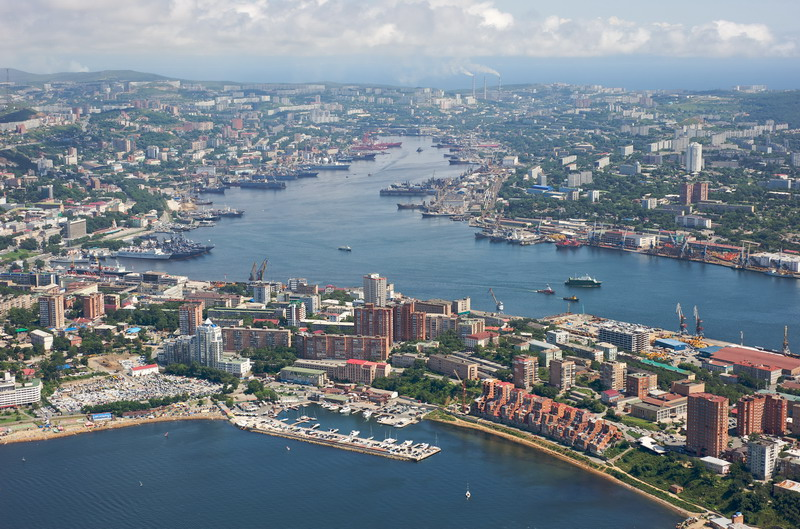
Vladivostok

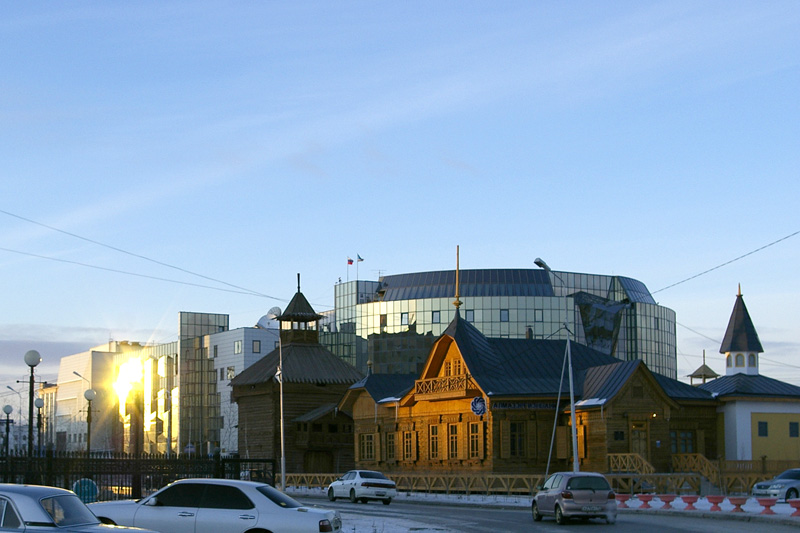
Yakutsk

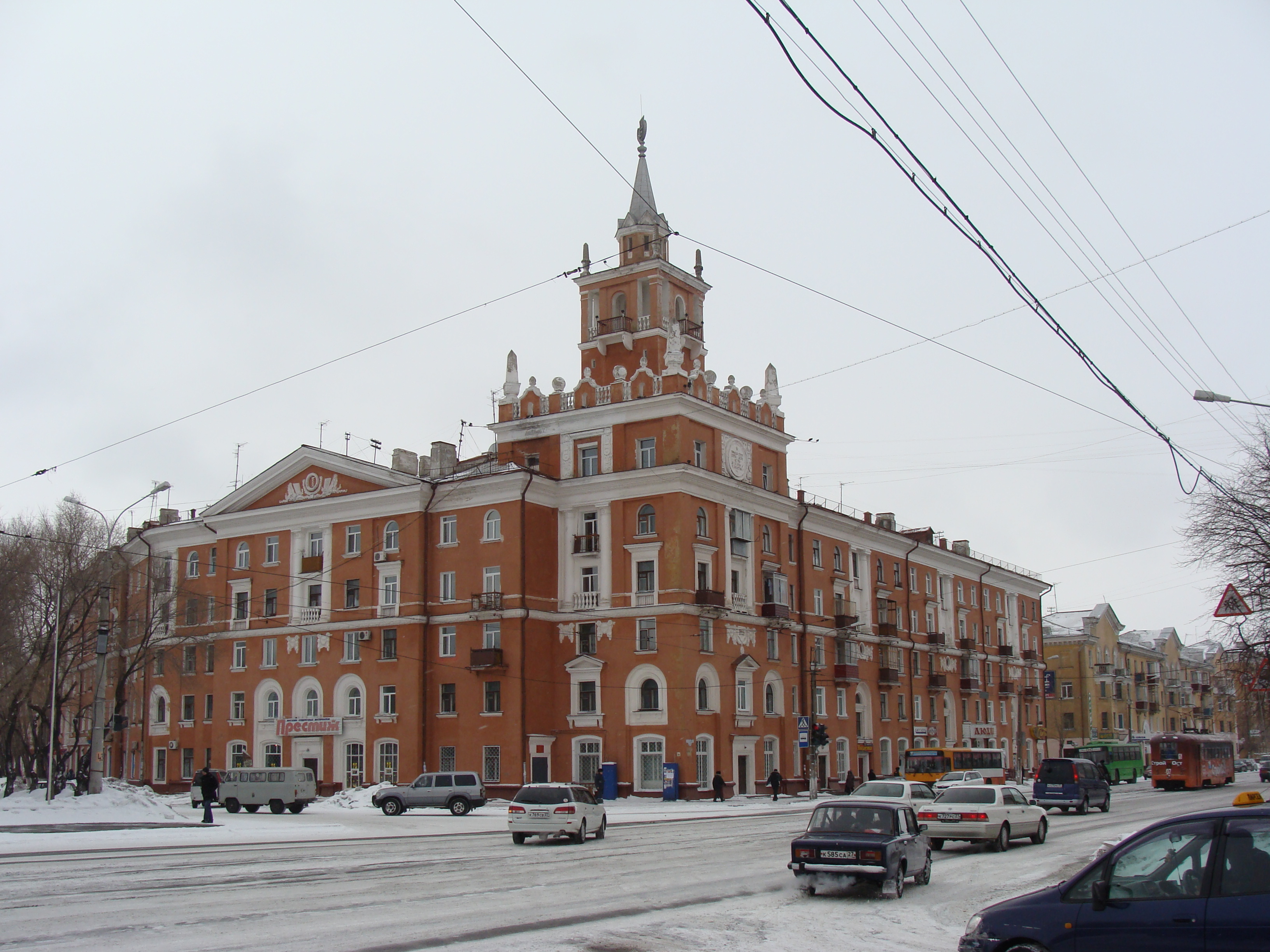
Komsomolsk-on-Amur

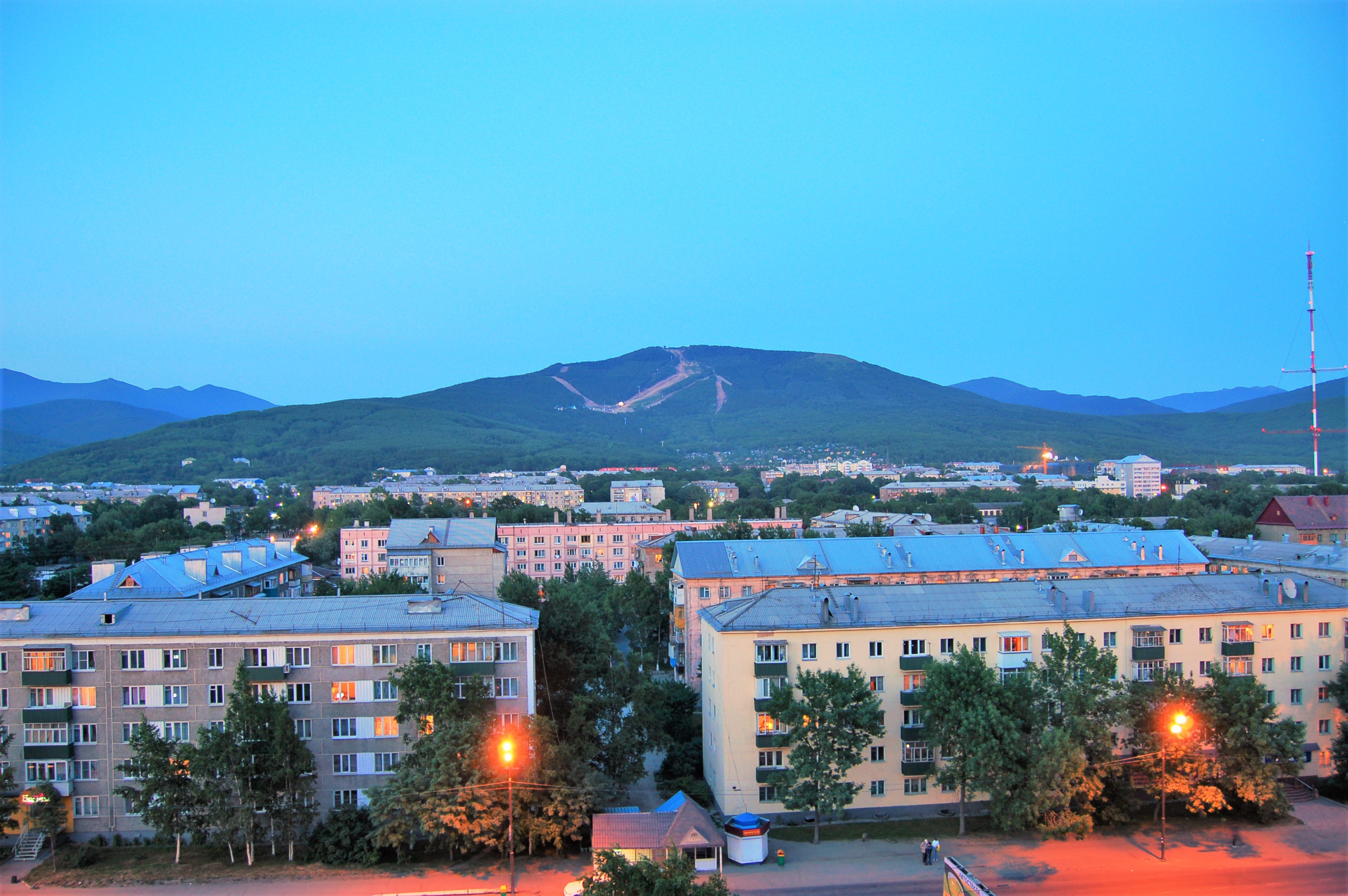
Yuzhno-Sakhalinsk

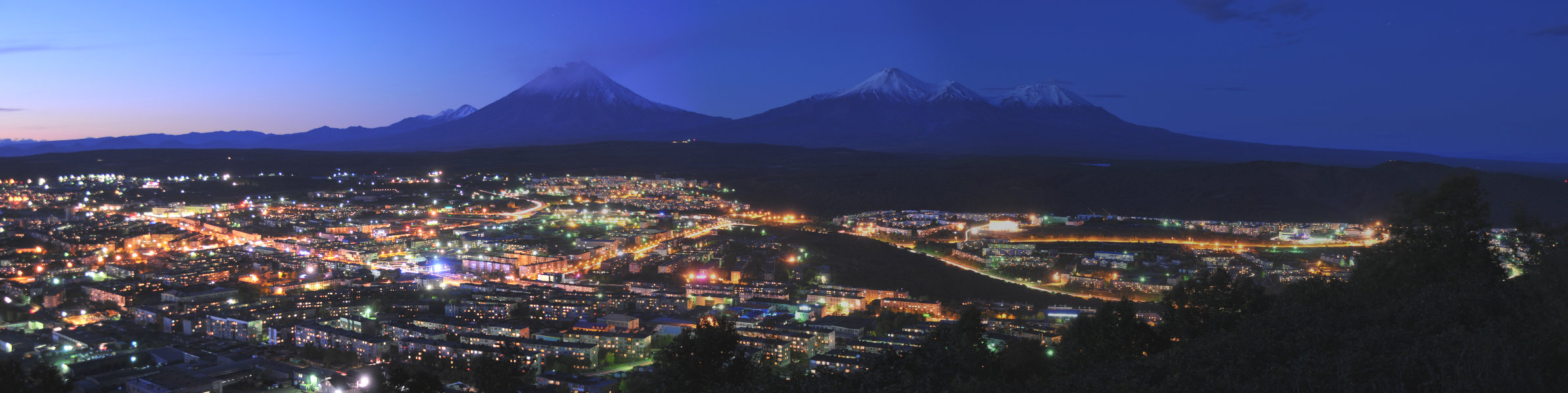
Petropavlovsk-Kamchatsky

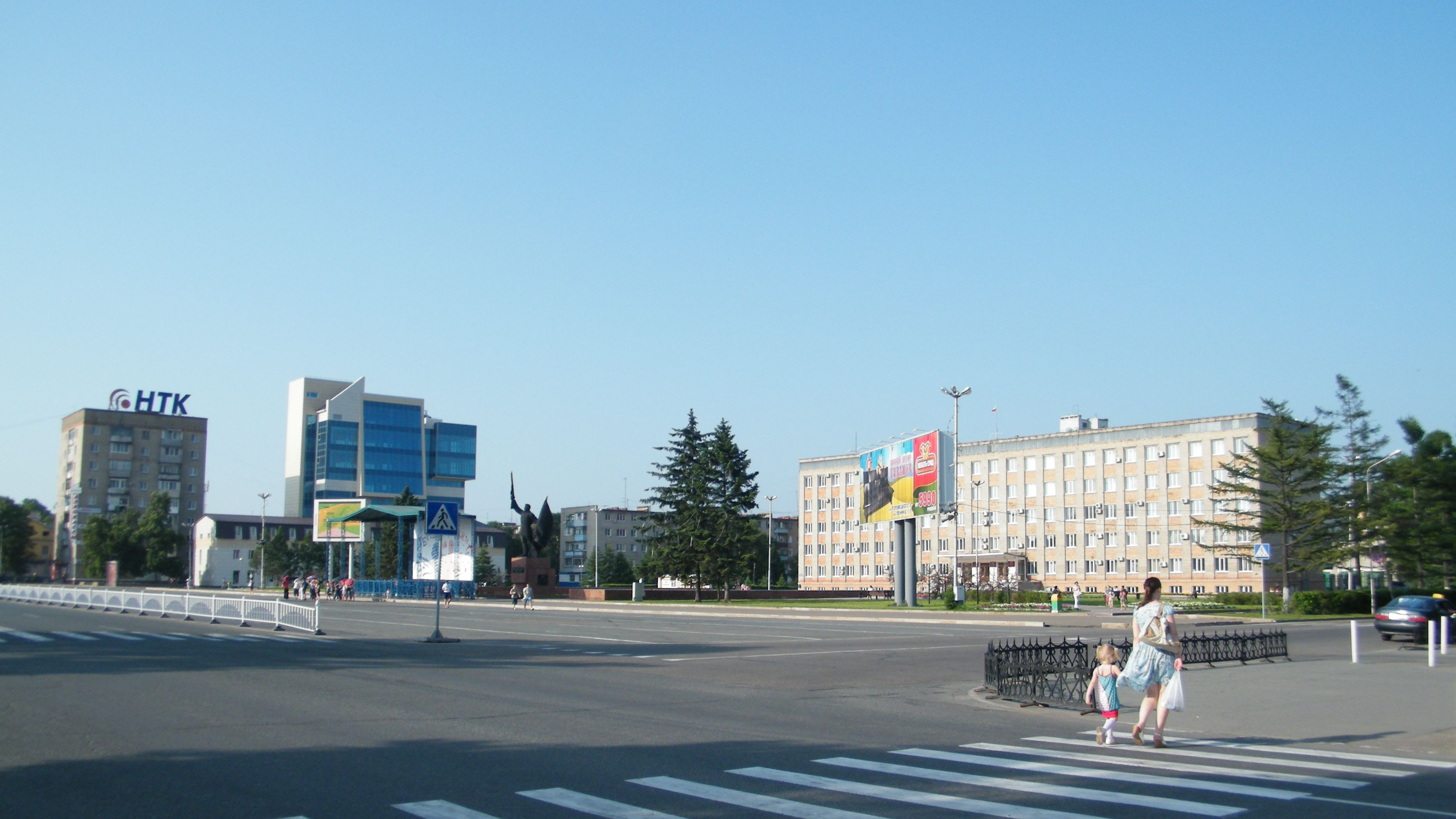
Ussuriysk

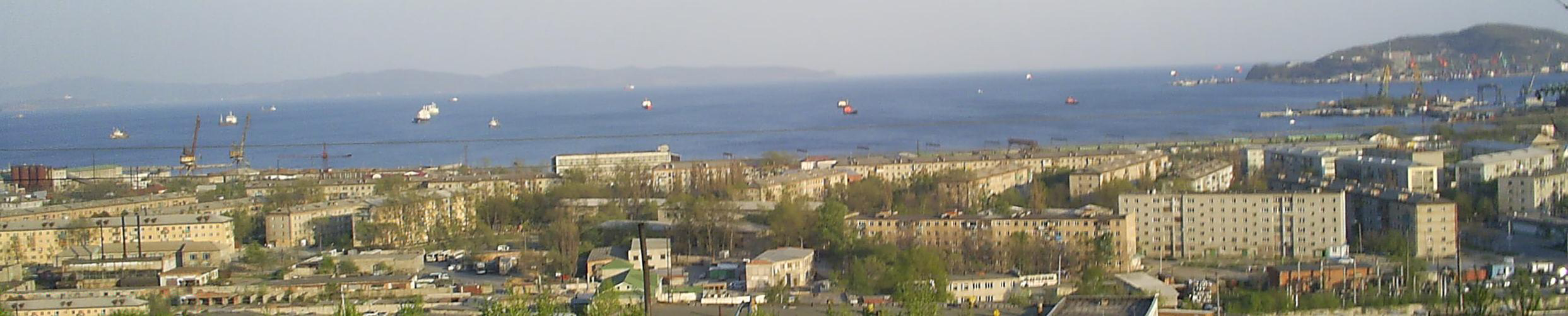
Nakhodka

Rank	City/town	Federal subject	Population (2015)
1	**Khabarovsk**	Khabarovsk Krai	607,216
2	**Vladivostok**	Primorsky Krai	604,602
3	**Yakutsk**	Sakha Republic	299,169
4	Komsomolsk-on-Amur	Khabarovsk Krai	253,030
5	**Blagoveshchensk**	Amur Oblast	224,192
6	**Yuzhno-Sakhalinsk**	Sakhalin Oblast	192,780
7	**Petropavlovsk-Kamchatsky**	Kamchatka Krai	181,015
8	Ussuriysk	Primorsky Krai	168,137
9	Nakhodka	Primorsky Krai	155,722
10	Artyom	Primorsky Krai	103,925
11	**Magadan**	Magadan Oblast	92,974
12	**Birobidzhan**	Jewish Autonomous Oblast	74,777
13	Belogorsk	Amur Oblast	67,216
14	Neryungri	Sakha Republic	58,133
15	Svobodny	Amur Oblast	55,159
16	Arsenyev	Primorsky Krai	53,543
17	Spassk-Dalny	Primorsky Krai	42,020
18	Amursk	Khabarovsk Krai	40,803
19	Yelizovo	Kamchatka Krai	38,637
20	Bolshoy Kamen	Primorsky Krai	38,637
21	Partizansk	Primorsky Krai	37,689
22	Lesozavodsk	Primorsky Krai	36,317
23	Dalnegorsk	Primorsky Krai	35,556
24	Mirny	Sakha Republic	34,354
25	Tynda	Amur Oblast	33,819
26	Korsakov	Sakhalin Oblast	32,962
27	Kholmsk	Sakhalin Oblast	28,751
28	Dalnerechensk	Primorsky Krai	26,461
29	Sovetskaya Gavan	Khabarovsk Krai	25,763
30	Zeya	Amur Oblast	23,966
31	Lensk	Sakha Republic	23,725
32	Fokino	Primorsky Krai	23,167
33	Vilyuchinsk	Kamchatka Krai	21,748
34	Okha	Sakhalin Oblast	21,203
35	Aldan	Sakha Republic	21,092
36	Nikolayevsk-na-Amure	Khabarovsk Krai	20,274
37	Luchegorsk	Primorsky Krai	19,720
38	Shimanovsk	Amur Oblast	18,941
39	Raychikhinsk	Amur Oblast	17,874
40	Bikin	Khabarovsk Krai	16,271
41	Vanino	Khabarovsk Krai	15,756
42	Poronaysk	Sakhalin Oblast	15,262
43	Kavalerovo	Primorsky Krai	14,659
44	**Anadyr**	Chukotka Autonomous Okrug	14,326
45	Vyazemsky	Khabarovsk Krai	13,575
46	Aykhal	Sakha Republic	13,408
47	Slavyanka	Primorsky Krai	12,675
48	Solnechny	Khabarovsk Krai	12,355
49	Chegdomyn	Khabarovsk Krai	12,334
50	Dolinsk	Sakhalin Oblast	11,730
51	Elban	Khabarovsk Krai	11,609
52	Udachny	Sakha Republic	11,564
53	Zavitinsk	Amur Oblast	10,876
54	Vilyuysk	Sakha Republic	10,656
55	Nevelsk	Sakhalin Oblast	10,603
56	Progress	Amur Oblast	10,381
57	Magdagachi	Amur Oblast	10,159
58	Pogranichny	Primorsky Krai	10,103
59	Seryshevo	Amur Oblast	10,100
60	Nogliki	Sakhalin Oblast	9,971
61	Khor	Khabarovsk Krai	9,920
62	Nyurba	Sakha Republic	9,908
63	Alexandrovsk-Sakhalinsky	Sakhalin Oblast	9,720
64	Uglegorsk	Sakhalin Oblast	9,395
65	Zhatay	Sakha Republic	9,290
66	Aniva	Sakhalin Oblast	9,288
67	Skovorodino	Amur Oblast	9,254
68	Olekminsk	Sakha Republic	9,178
69	Pokrovsk	Sakha Republic	9,047
70	Arkhara	Amur Oblast	9,044
71	Obluchye	Jewish Autonomous Oblast	8,811
72	Zavety Ilicha	Khabarovsk Krai	8,706
73	Chulman	Sakha Republic	8,639
74	Yaroslavsky	Primorsky Krai	8,535
75	Kirovsky	Primorsky Krai	8,439
76	Sibirtsevo	Primorsky Krai	8,355
77	Pereyaslavka	Khabarovsk Krai	8,012
78	Novobureysky	Amur Oblast	7,701
79	Tymovskoye	Sakhalin Oblast	7,489
80	Novoshakhtinsky	Primorsky Krai	7,414
81	Dunay	Primorsky Krai	7,392
82	Tommot	Sakha Republic	7,327
83	Smirnykh	Sakhalin Oblast	7,247
84	Yuzhno-Kurilsk	Sakhalin Oblast	7,196
85	Shakhtersk	Sakhalin Oblast	7,094
86	Nikolayevka	Jewish Autonomous Oblast	7,067
87	Preobrazheniye	Primorsky Krai	6,724
88	Smolyaninovo	Primorsky Krai	6,715
89	Makarov	Sakhalin Oblast	6,681
90	Novy Urgal	Khabarovsk Krai	6,453
91	Khandyga	Sakha Republic	6,432
92	Lipovtsy	Primorsky Krai	6,286
93	Mokhsogollokh	Sakha Republic	6,255
94	Tsiolkovsky	Amur Oblast	6,208
95	Ola	Magadan Oblast	6,191
96	Oktyabrsky	Khabarovsk Krai	6,013
97	Ust-Nera	Sakha Republic	5,898
98	Korfovsky	Khabarovsk Krai	5,809
99	Nizhny Kuranakh	Sakha Republic	5,641
100	Bilibino	Chukotka Autonomous Okrug	5,592
101	Plastun	Primorsky Krai	5,114
102	Susuman	Magadan Oblast	5,010
103	Peleduy	Sakha Republic	5,010
104	Shkotovo	Primorsky Krai	4,973
105	Fevralsk	Amur Oblast	4,840
106	Yerofey Pavlovich	Amur Oblast	4,769
107	Sokol	Magadan Oblast	4,763
108	Pevek	Chukotka Autonomous Okrug	4,721
109	Talakan	Amur Oblast	4,639
110	Tiksi	Sakha Republic	4,557
111	Smidovich	Jewish Autonomous Oblast	4,555
112	Chernyshevsky	Sakha Republic	4,389
113	Bureya	Amur Oblast	4,388
114	Gornye Klyuchi	Primorsky Krai	4,318
115	Vitim	Sakha Republic	4,307
116	Sangar	Sakha Republic	4,049
117	Serebryany Bor	Sakha Republic	4,004
118	Palatka	Magadan Oblast	3,996
119	Tomari	Sakhalin Oblast	3,955
120	Vostok	Primorsky Krai	3,925
121	Teploozersk	Jewish Autonomous Oblast	3,877
122	Omsukchan	Magadan Oblast	3,824
123	Yagodnoye	Magadan Oblast	3,811
124	Batagay	Sakha Republic	3,801
125	Berkakit	Sakha Republic	3,801
126	Priamursky	Jewish Autonomous Oblast	3,787
127	Olga	Primorsky Krai	3,782
128	Mukhen	Khabarovsk Krai	3,728
129	Okhotsk	Khabarovsk Krai	3,713
130	Ugolnye Kopi	Chukotka Autonomous Okrug	3,666
131	Nizhny Bestyakh	Sakha Republic	3,638
132	Srednekolymsk	Sakha Republic	3,502
133	Ust-Omchug	Magadan Oblast	3,452
134	Urusha	Amur Oblast	3,420
135	Terney	Primorsky Krai	3,360
136	Svetly	Sakha Republic	3,187
137	Lososina	Khabarovsk Krai	3,154
138	Vysokogorny	Khabarovsk Krai	3,151
139	Khrustalny	Primorsky Krai	3,083
140	Gornorechensky	Primorsky Krai	3,056
141	Egvekinot	Chukotka Autonomous Okrug	3,034
142	Palana	Kamchatka Krai	3,007
143	Kraskino	Primorsky Krai	2,983
144	Zyryanka	Sakha Republic	2,928
145	Zarubino	Primorsky Krai	2,918
146	Bira	Jewish Autonomous Oblast	2,889
147	Deputatsky	Sakha Republic	2,831
148	Kysyl-Syr	Sakha Republic	2,797
149	Ust-Maya	Sakha Republic	2,718
150	Chersky	Sakha Republic	2,639
151	Sinegorye	Magadan Oblast	2,501
152	Maysky	Khabarovsk Krai	2,453
153	Severo-Kurilsk	Sakhalin Oblast	2,448
154	Mnogovershinny	Khabarovsk Krai	2,430
155	Seymchan	Magadan Oblast	2,391
156	Chokurdakh	Sakha Republic	2,118
157	Belaya Gora	Sakha Republic	2,101
158	Ush·chmun	Amur Oblast	2,094
159	Provideniya	Chukotka Autonomous Okrug	2,034
160	Stekolny	Magadan Oblast	2,027
161	Primorsky	Primorsky Krai	2,007
162	Uptar	Magadan Oblast	2,003
163	Birakan	Jewish Autonomous Oblast	1,941
164	Novoraychikhinsk	Amur Oblast	1,940
165	Vakhrushev	Sakhalin Oblast	1,922
166	Posyet	Primorsky Krai	1,837
167	Volochayevka-2	Jewish Autonomous Oblast	1,810
168	Sivaki	Amur Oblast	1,790
169	Leninsky	Sakha Republic	1,762
170	Myaundzha	Magadan Oblast	1,677
171	Izvestkovy	Jewish Autonomous Oblast	1,676
172	Kurilsk	Sakhalin Oblast	1,670
173	Evensk	Magadan Oblast	1,571
174	Gorny	Khabarovsk Krai	1,536
175	Vulkanny	Kamchatka Krai	1,534
176	Dzhebariki-Khaya	Sakha Republic	1,499
177	Dukat	Magadan Oblast	1,491
178	Kuldur	Jewish Autonomous Oblast	1,465
179	Almazny	Sakha Republic	1,430
180	Khingansk	Jewish Autonomous Oblast	1,248
181	Eldikan	Sakha Republic	1,223
182	Verkhoyansk	Sakha Republic	1,150
183	Orotukan	Magadan Oblast	1,143
184	Lazarev	Khabarovsk Krai	1,125
185	Ekimchan	Amur Oblast	1,066
186	Solnechny	Sakha Republic	1,003
187	Lebediny	Sakha Republic	994
188	Beringovsky	Chukotka Autonomous Okrug	983
189	Tokur	Amur Oblast	949
190	Londoko-zavod	Jewish Autonomous Oblast	949
191	Kholodny	Magadan Oblast	874
192	Putyatin	Primorsky Krai	820
193	Svetlaya	Primorsky Krai	811
194	Ust-Kuyga	Sakha Republic	768
195	Debin	Magadan Oblast	682
196	Khani	Sakha Republic	677
197	Khasan	Primorsky Krai	660
198	Zolotinka	Sakha Republic	577
199	Artyk	Sakha Republic	483
200	Atka	Magadan Oblast	415
201	Zvezdochka	Sakha Republic	354
202	Talaya	Magadan Oblast	299
203	Nizhneyansk	Sakha Republic	279
204	Ese-Khayya	Sakha Republic	199
205	Burkhala	Magadan Oblast	171
206	Mys Shmidta	Chukotka Autonomous Okrug	166
207	Yugoryonok	Sakha Republic	136
208	Allakh-Yun	Sakha Republic	96
209	Nagorny	Sakha Republic	68
