= Administrative divisions of Magadan Oblast =

Administrative districts of Russian federal subject

Magadan Oblast Russia
- Administrative center: Magadan

Administrative structure (as of 2013)
- Districts: 8
- Cities/towns: 2
- Urban-type settlements: 28
- Selsovets: 29

Municipal structure (as of 2002)
- Rural settlements: 89 (inhabited); 37 (uninhabited)

Map of Magadan Oblast (with numbered)

Magadan Oblast is a federal subject of Russia.

== Administrative and municipal divisions ==
Map

Division	Structure		OKATO	OKTMO	Urban-type settlement/ district-level town*	Rural (selsovet)
Division	Administrative	Municipal	OKATO	OKTMO	Urban-type settlement/ district-level town*	Rural (selsovet)
Magadan (Магадан)	city	urban okrug	44 401	44 701	Sokol (Сокол); Uptar (Уптар)	
Olsky (Ольский)	district	urban okrug	44 201	44 702	Arman (Армань); Ola (Ола)	7
Omsukchansky (Омсукчанский)	district	urban okrug	44 204	44 704	Dukat (Дукат); Galimy (Галимый); Omsukchan (Омсукчан)	2
Severo-Evensky (Северо-Эвенский)	district	urban okrug	44 207	44 707	Evensk (Эвенск)	5
Srednekansky (Среднеканский)	district	urban okrug	44 210	44 710	Seymchan (Сеймчан)	4
Susumansky (Сусуманский)	district	urban okrug	44 213	44 713	Susuman (Сусуман) town*; Belichan (Беличан); Bolshevik (Большевик); Kadykchan (Кадыкчан); Kholodny (Холодный); Myaundzha (Мяунджа); Shiroky (Широкий)	1
Tenkinsky (Тенькинский)	district	urban okrug	44 216	44 716	Ust-Omchug (Усть-Омчуг)	6
Khasynsky (Хасынский)	district	urban okrug	44 219	44 719	Atka (Атка); Karamken (Карамкен); Palatka (Палатка); Stekolny (Стекольный); Talaya (Талая)	1
Yagodninsky (Ягоднинский)	district	urban okrug	44 222	44 722	Burkhala (Бурхала); Debin (Дебин); Orotukan (Оротукан); Sinegorye (Синегорье); Spornoye (Спорное); Verkhny At-Uryakh (Верхний Ат-Урях); Yagodnoye (Ягодное)	3
