= Kolyma Hydroelectric Station =

Dam in Yagodninsky District, Magadan Oblast, Russia

Kolyma Dam
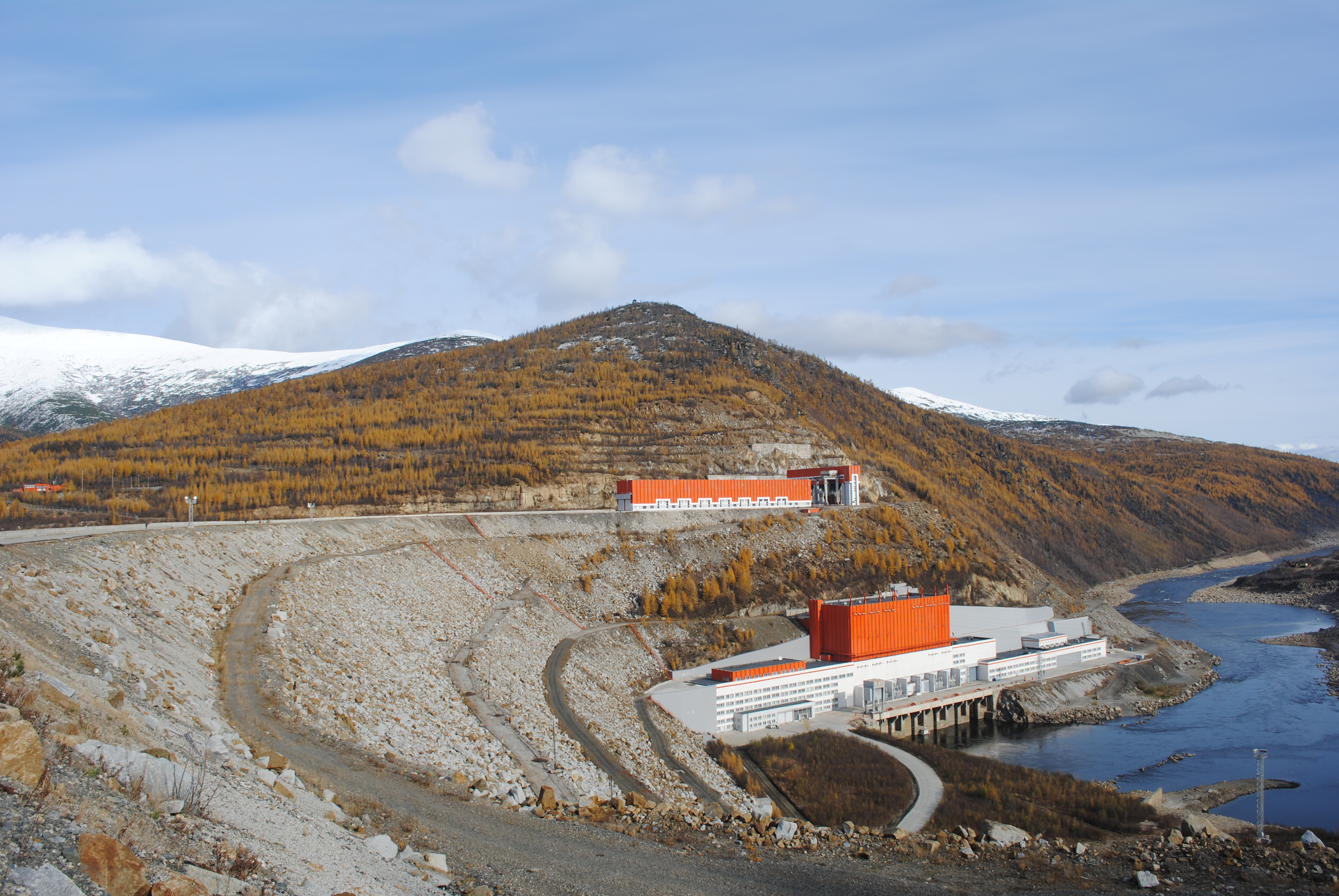

- Location within Russia
- Official name: Kolyma Hydroelectric Station
- Country: Russia
- Location: Sinegorye, Yagodninsky District, Magadan Oblast
- Coordinates: 62°3′19.68″N 150°24′29.83″E
- Purpose: Power
- Status: Operational
- Construction began: 1974
- Opening date: 1982; 44 years ago
- Owner: RusHydro

Dam and spillways
- Type of dam: Embankment, rock-fill
- Impounds: Kolyma River
- Height: 134.5 m (441 ft)
- Length: 683 m (2,241 ft)
- Spillway capacity: 11,300 m^{3}/s (400,000 cu ft/s)

Reservoir
- Total capacity: 15,080,000,000 m^{3} (12,230,000 acre⋅ft)
- Active capacity: 7,240,000,000 m^{3} (5,870,000 acre⋅ft)
- Surface area: 454.6 km^{2} (175.5 mi^{2})

Power Station
- Operator: RusHydro
- Commission date: 1982–1994
- Type: Conventional
- Hydraulic head: 115.2 m (378 ft)
- Turbines: 4 x 180 MW Deriaz-type; 1 x 180 MW Francis-type
- Installed capacity: 900 MW

Kolyma Hydroelectric Station is located on the Kolyma River in the village of Sinegorye, Yagodninsky District, Magadan Oblast Russia. It has an installed power generation capacity of 900 MW. Kolyma HPP is the basis of the energy system of Magadan Oblast; it produces about 95% of the electricity in the region. It is the upper stage of the Kolyma cascade. The lower one (Ust-Srednekan Hydroelectric Plant), with an installed capacity of 570 MW, was completed in 2024.

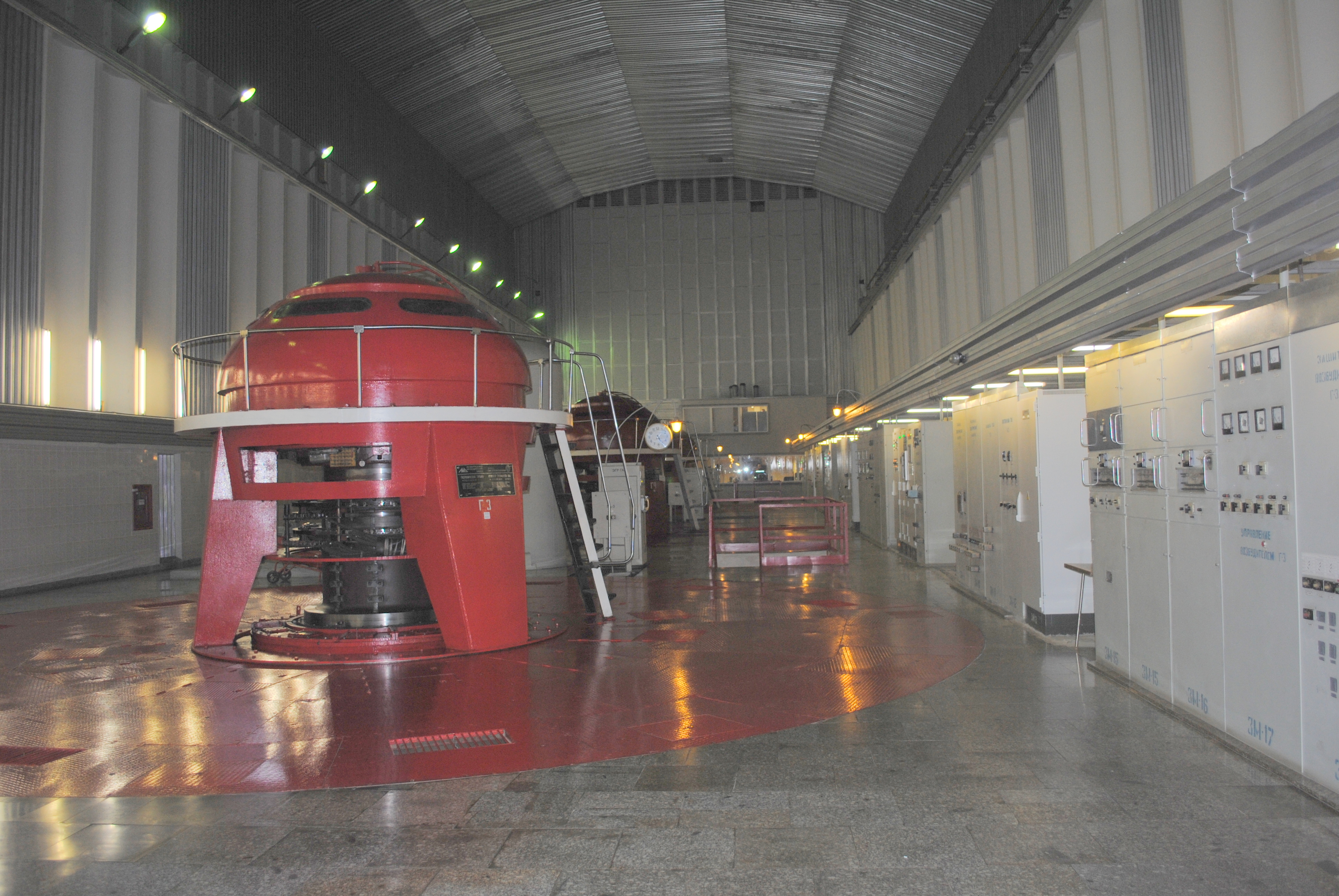
Kolyma Turbine Hall

Construction began in 1974 and the first generator was commissioned in 1982, the last in 1994. The facility was placed into permanent operation in 2007. Construction of the Kolyma HPP was carried out in the harsh climatic conditions in the zone of permafrost. At 134.5 m (441 ft), it is the highest earth filled dam in Russia. It is also the most powerful hydroelectric plant in the country with an underground power station.

Electricity generation of the Kolyma Hydroelectric Station since 2007, million kWh
| Year | 2007 | 2008 | 2009 | 2010 | 2011 | 2012 | 2013 | 2014 |
|---|---|---|---|---|---|---|---|---|
| million kWh | 2016 | 2012 | 1943 | 1973 | 2033 | 2030 | 1924 | 1558 |
| Year | 2015 | 2016 | 2017 | 2018 | 2019 | 2020 | 2021 | 2022 |
| million kWh | 1672 | 1663 | 1748 | 1933 | 2022 | 1942 | 2134 | 2188 |

== Structural design ==
Kolyma Hydroelectric Station is a high-head dam-type power plant. Its main structures include a rock-fill dam, an underground powerhouse with water supply system, a floodgate, and a production and technology complex with an indoor switchgear. The station features an extensive system of permanent and temporary underground facilities, with a total length of 7.2 km and a rock excavation volume of 425,000 m³. The plant has a nameplate capacity of 900 MW, a guaranteed capacity of 224 MW, and a projected average annual electricity output of 3.325 billion kWh.

== Economic significance ==
The Kolyma Hydroelectric Station launch allowed the Arkagalinskaya Thermal Power Plant to be placed on standby and significantly reduced coal consumption at the Magadan Thermal Power Plant, which is shut down outside the heating season and replaced by an electric boiler. Several settlements in the Magadan Region have also transitioned to electric heating.

The reduction in coal use helps prevent the burning of approximately 1 million tons of coal annually. During the construction of the Kolyma Hydroelectric Station, the settlements of Sinegorye and Uptar were also built, along with power transmission lines and reconstructed transport infrastructure.

== See also ==
- Kolyma Reservoir
- Taskan
