= Debin (river) =

Debin Дебин
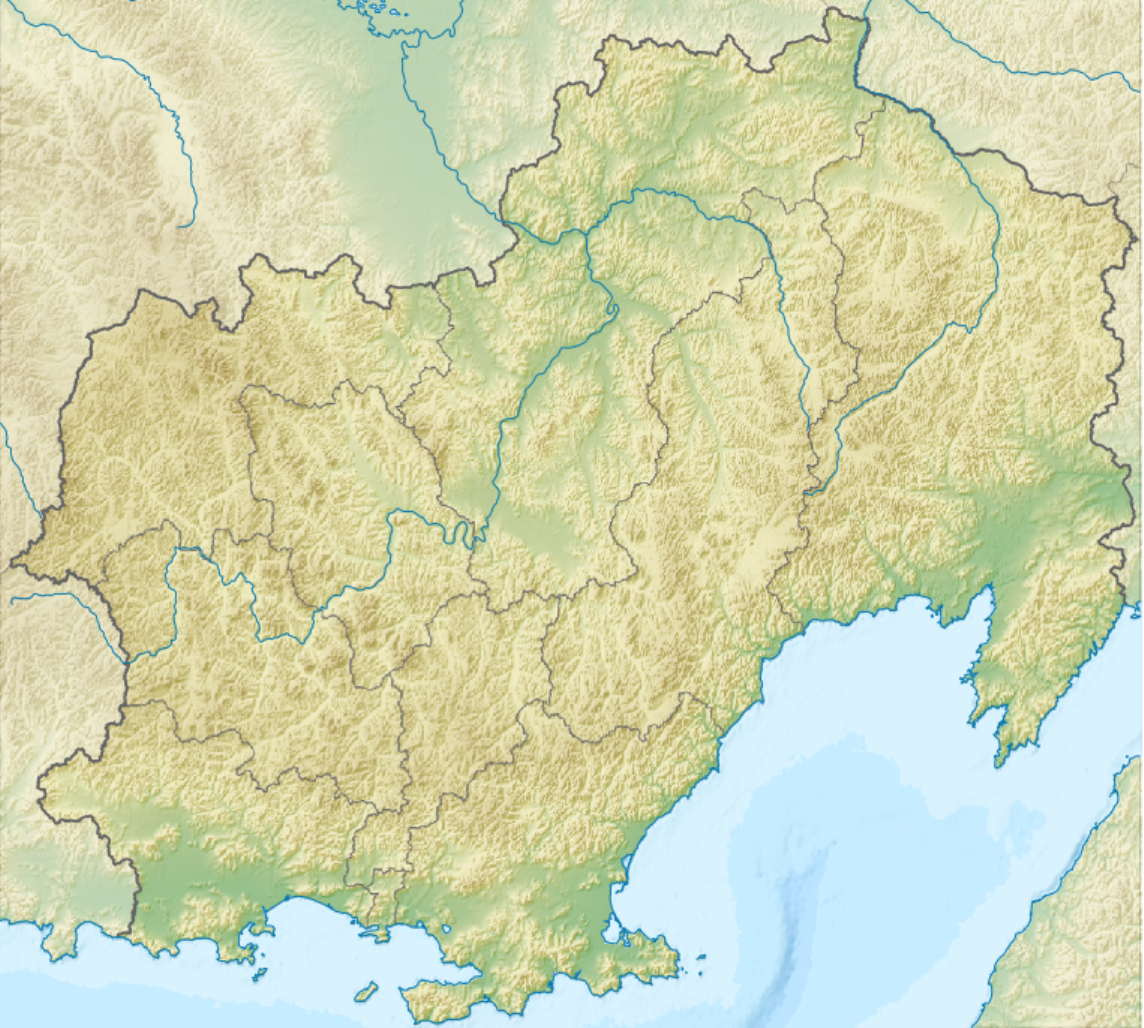
- Mouth location in Magadan Oblast, Russia

Location
- Federal subject: Magadan Oblast, Russia

Physical characteristics
- Source
  - location: Cherge Range
  - coordinates: 63°18′38″N 148°25′54″E
  - elevation: 918 m (3,012 ft)
- Mouth: Kolyma
  - location: Near Debin
  - coordinates: 62°18′06″N 150°47′16″E
  - elevation: 317 m (1,040 ft)
- Length: 248 km (154 mi)
- Basin size: 5,530 km^{2} (2,140 sq mi)

Basin features
- Progression: Kolyma→ East Siberian Sea

The Debin (Russian: Дебин) is a river in the Yagodninsky district of Magadan Oblast, Russia. It is a left hand tributary of the Kolyma. Its length is 248 kilometres (154 mi), counting the length of the Archagyl stream at its head, and it has a drainage basin of 5,530 square kilometres (2,140 mi^{2}).

Yagodnoye village is located on the left bank of the Debin; the R504 Kolyma Highway crosses the river in its middle course and runs on the northern side of the river, roughly parallel to its lower course until it bends northwards near Debin.

The name of the river is based on the Yakut word "daebin" (дьэбин), meaning "rust".

== History ==
Since the 1960s placer gold deposits have been exploited in the Debin river basin. As a result, there has been much environmental degradation in certain places. Some of the settlements involved in mining operations in the river basin have been abandoned. Only the villages of Burkhala, located near the R504 Highway bridge, and Senokosny, near Yagodnoye have survived, albeit with only a residual population.

== Course ==
The Debin has its sources in the eastern slopes of Mount Spornaya, east of the highest point of the Cherge Range at the eastern end of the Chersky Range, where it overlaps with the Upper Kolyma Highlands. There is continuous permafrost in the area. The river heads first in a roughly southeastern direction through a narrow valley. It bends to the east in its lower course, meandering in a floodplain with lakes. Finally the Debin joins the left bank of the Kolyma 5 km (3.1 mi) upstream from Debin. There is an airfield south of the mouth area, with a road connecting it to Debin. Just below the confluence of the Debin, 1,809 km (1,124 mi) from its mouth, the valley of the Kolyma expands into a floodplain where its channel divides into branches.

The Debin is located in a sparsely populated region of severe cold winters; it usually freezes in early October and stays frozen until May. Its longest tributaries are the 55 km (34 mi) long Sukhakhy and the 51 km (32 mi) long Dzhelgala.

== See also ==
- List of rivers of Russia
