= Debin =

Debin Дебин
- Urban-type settlement
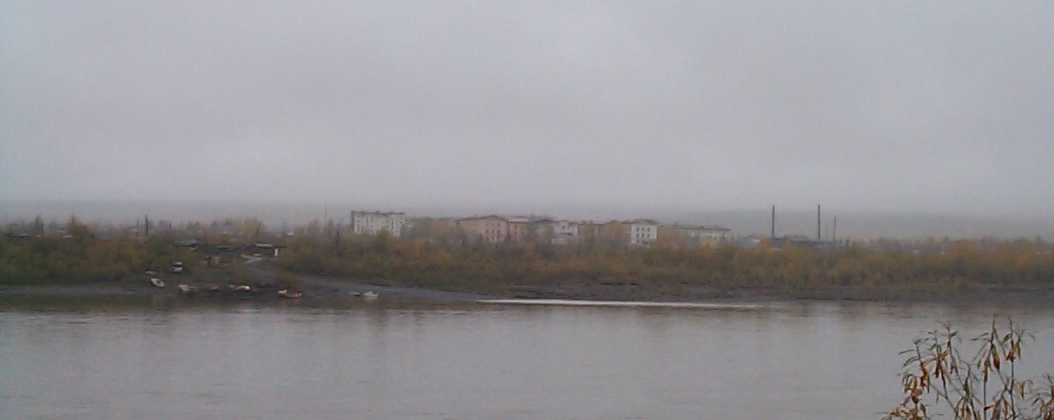
- Debin through the morning mist over the Kolyma River
- Interactive map of Debin
- Location of Debin Debin (Magadan Oblast)
- Coordinates: 62°21′N 150°46′E
- Country: Russia
- Federal subject: Magadan Oblast
- Administrative district: Yagodninsky District
- Founded: 1937

Population (2010 Census)
  - Total: 721
  - Estimate (2025): 435 (−39.7%)
- Time zone: UTC+11 (MSK+8)
- Postal code: 686217
- OKTMO ID: 44722000061

Debin (Russian: Де́бин, IPA: [ˈdʲebʲɪn]) is an urban locality (an urban-type settlement) in Yagodninsky District of Magadan Oblast, Russia. Population: 721 (2010 census); 921 (2002 census); 2,387 (1989 Soviet census).

== Geography ==
40 kilometers (25 mi) upstream is Sinegorye and the Kolyma dam.

== History ==
Debin was founded in 1935 with the creation of a ferry point over the Kolyma, initially under the name Pereprava. In 1937 it was renamed for the Debin River, which joins the Kolyma a few kilometers upstream from the settlement. During the era of the Gulag network, it was the base for one of the larger prison camps administered by Dalstroy in the Kolyma region, centred on using forced labour for gold mining.

From 1946 to 1953, the central hospital for the Northeast camps (Sevvostlag) was located in Debin. In 1990, stakes with numbers of the graves of those who died in the hospital survived. In 1991 a memorial “Sign of Sorrow” was erected.

== Infrastructure ==
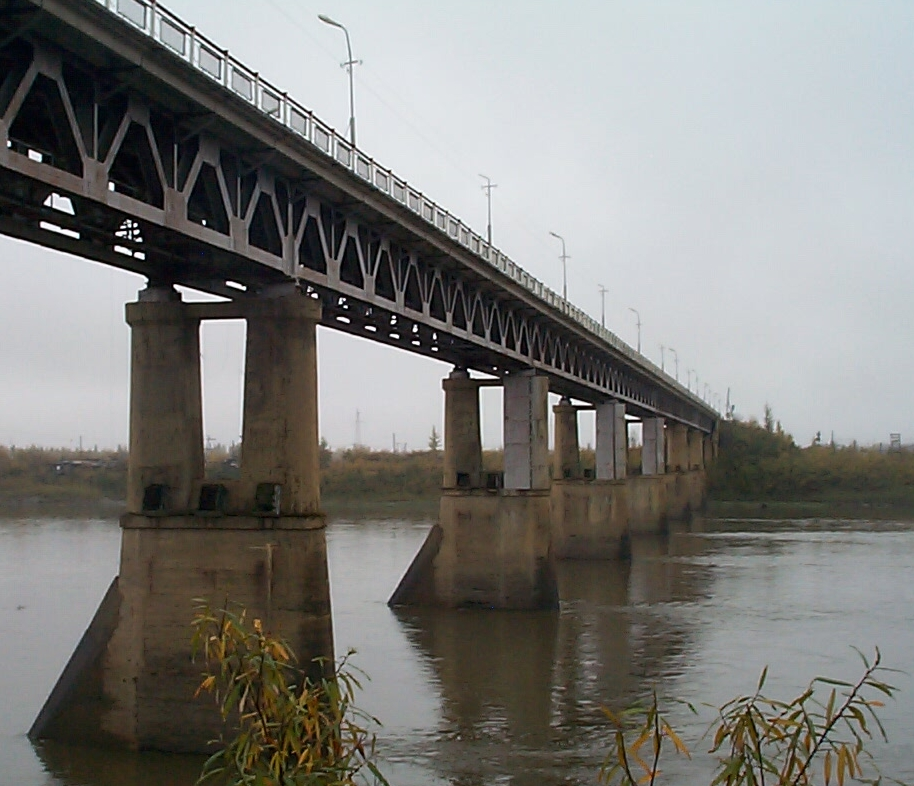
Old bridge over the Kolyma before its dismantling in Debin.

Debin is located on the Kolyma Highway, at the point where it crosses the Kolyma River. From here, roads also lead to Sinegorye and to other smaller localities such as Taskan, Elgen and Verkhny At-Uryakh.
