= Preobrazheniye =

Preobrazheniye (Lit. Transfiguration in Russian) may refer to:

- Preobrazheniye, Primorsky Krai, an urban-type settlement in Primorsky Krai, Russia
- Preobrazheniye, Tver Oblast, a village in Tver Oblast, Russia
- Preobrazheniye Bay, a bay of Sea of Japan in Primorsky Krai
