= Spornoye =

Spornoye Спорное
- Abandoned village
- Location within Magadan Oblast Location within Russia
- Coordinates: 62°20′30″N 151°5′50″E
- Country: Russia
- Federal subject: Magadan Oblast
- District: Yagodninsky District
- Time zone: UTC+11:00
- Postal code: 686214

Spornoye (Russian: Спорное) was a rural locality (a settlement) in the Yagodninsky District of Magadan Oblast, Russia. Population: 8 (2010 census); 921 (2002 census); It was abolished on 8 May 2015.

== Etymology ==
The locality was named Spornoye, meaning "dispute", as it was a subject of dispute between geologists, Ernesta Bertina and Sergej Novikov.
