= Myaundzha =

Myaundzha Мяунджа
- Urban-type settlement
- Interactive map of Myaundzha
- Location of Myaundzha Myaundzha (Magadan Oblast)
- Coordinates: 63°03′N 147°11′E
- Country: Russia
- Federal subject: Magadan Oblast
- Administrative district: Susumansky District
- Founded: 1950
- Urban-type settlement status since: 1957

Population (2010 Census)
  - Total: 1,663
  - Estimate (2025): 985 (−40.8%)
- Time zone: UTC+11 (MSK+8)
- Postal code: 686332
- OKTMO ID: 44713000061

Myaundzha (Russian: Мя́унджа) is an urban locality (an urban-type settlement) in Susumansky District of Magadan Oblast, Russia, located in the Kolyma Mountains, on the right bank of the Myaundzha River (a part of the Ayan-Yuryakh River system), about 430 kilometers (270 mi) north-northwest of Magadan, the administrative center of the oblast. Population: 1,663 (2010 census); 2,131 (2002 census); 5,090 (1989 Soviet census).

== History ==
It was founded in 1950 in conjunction with the construction of the coal-fired Arkagalinskaya thermal power station, which began operation in 1955. Urban-type settlement status was granted to it in 1957.

== Economy and transportation ==
Most of the settlement's population is employed at the power station, which is the second largest source of electricity in the oblast behind the hydroelectric plant on the Kolyma River near Sinegorye.

The M56 Kolyma Highway runs close by, allowing road access to Magadan.
