= Taskan =

Taskan Таскан
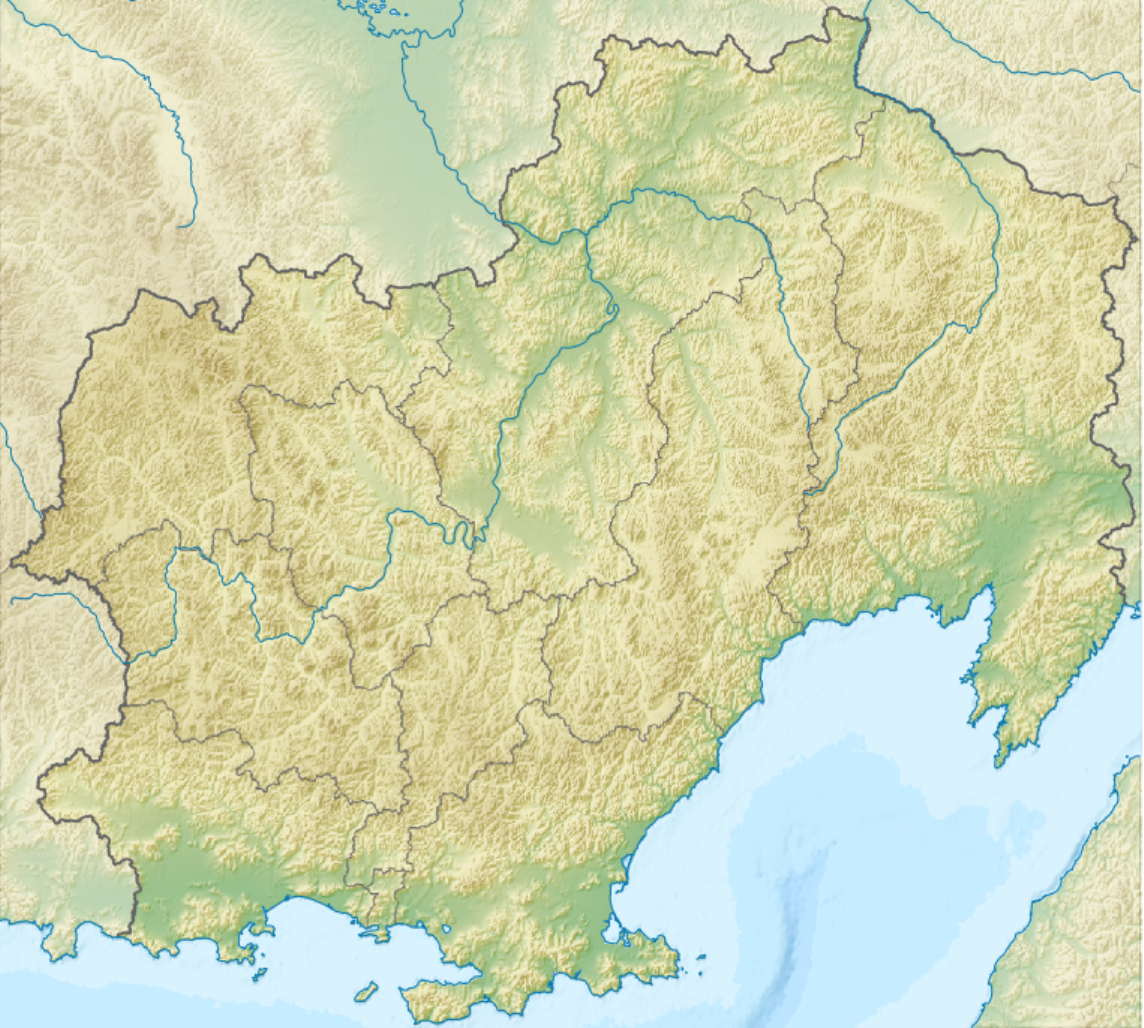
- Mouth location in Magadan Oblast, Russia

Location
- Federal subject: Magadan Oblast, Russia

Physical characteristics
- Source
  - location: Chersky Range
  - elevation: 918 m (3,012 ft)
- Mouth: Kolyma
  - coordinates: 62°40′10″N 150°53′22″E
  - elevation: 301 m (988 ft)
- Length: 232 km (144 mi)
- Basin size: 11,200 km^{2} (4,300 sq mi)

Basin features
- Progression: Kolyma→ East Siberian Sea

The Taskan (Russian: Таскан) is a river in the Susuman and Yagodninsky districts of Magadan Oblast, Russia. It is a left hand tributary of the Kolyma. Its length is 232 kilometres (144 mi), with a drainage basin of 11,200 square kilometres (4,300 mi^{2}). The Taskan was first mapped in the 19th century by explorer Jan Czerski.

Perch, ruffe, gudgeon and burbot are found in the waters of the river.

== Course ==
The Taskan River begins in the southeastern slopes of 1,820 m (5,970 ft) high Mount Shoguchan, at the eastern end of the Chersky Range in an area of ice fields, the largest of which is 16 km^{2} (6.2 sq mi). It heads roughly southeastwards across permafrost terrain covered by tundra vegetation interspersed with sparse taiga. Finally it joins the left bank of the Kolyma between the Kolyma Dam and the Ust-Srednekan Dam, 1,754 km (1,090 mi) from its mouth.

The Taskan is located in a sparsely populated region of severe cold winters. Its main tributaries are the Mylga and the Sudar. The only populated places by the river were the now abandoned villages of Taskan and Elgen, as well as the also abandoned Ust-Taskan settlement located at the confluence with the Kolyma. The river usually freezes in early October and stays frozen until May. The highest water flow is between mid-May to June in average years.

== See also ==
- List of rivers of Russia
