= Khingansk =

Human settlement in Obluchensky District, Jewish Autonomous Oblast, Russia

Coordinates: 49°07′00″N 131°11′00″E

Khingansk is an urban locality (an urban-type settlement) in Obluchensky District of the Jewish Autonomous Oblast, Russia. Population: 2,151 (2010 Census); 2,543 (2002 Census); 3,089 (1989 Soviet census).
