= Taskan (village) =

Taskan Таскан
- Abandoned village
- Location within Magadan Oblast Location within Russia
- Coordinates: 62°59′11″N 150°19′43″E
- Country: Russia
- Federal subject: Magadan Oblast
- District: Yagodninsky District

Population (2021)
  - Total: 0
- Time zone: UTC+11:00
- Postal code: 686257

Taskan (Russian: Таскан) was a rural locality in Yagodninsky District, Magadan Oblast, Russian Far East.

There is a road leading to Yagodnoye to the southwest of Taskan and another to Elgen to the southeast.

== Geography ==
This abandoned settlement is located in the Upper Kolyma Highlands by the confluence of the Mylga and the Taskan, a left tributary of the Kolyma that flows from the Chersky Range.

== History ==
Taskan was established in the 1930s. In the 1940s, there was a food processing factory which employed mostly prisoners. In the 1960s, the first two-story wooden buildings were built, as the economy began to develop. By 1993, the population had risen to about 850 inhabitants and there was a state farm that specialized in animal husbandry and the growing of vegetables. The population fell rapidly after the collapse of the USSR and only a residual population remained. According to the 2010 census only 30 people lived in Taskan. Finally the settlement was abolished in 2019.

Yevgenia Ginzburg (1904 - 1977), a Soviet author, served a term in Taskan as a nurse during her imprisonment in the 1940s under Stalin's regime.

== See also ==
- Journey into the Whirlwind
