= Izvestkovy =

Izvestkovy Известковый
- Settlement
- Location within Altai Republic Location within Russia
- Coordinates: 51°45′N 85°43′E
- Country: Russia
- Region: Altai Republic
- District: Mayminsky District
- Time zone: UTC+7:00

Izvestkovy (Russian: Известковый; Altay: Череттӱ, Çerettü) is a rural locality (a settlement) in Ust-Muninskoye Rural Settlement of Mayminsky District, the Altai Republic, Russia. The population was 46 in 2016. There are five streets.

== Geography ==
Izvestkovy is located on the Katun River, 42 kilometres (26 mi) southwest of Mayma (the district's administrative centre) by road. Ust-Muny is the nearest rural locality.
