= Burkhala =

Burkhala Бурхала
- Urban-type settlement
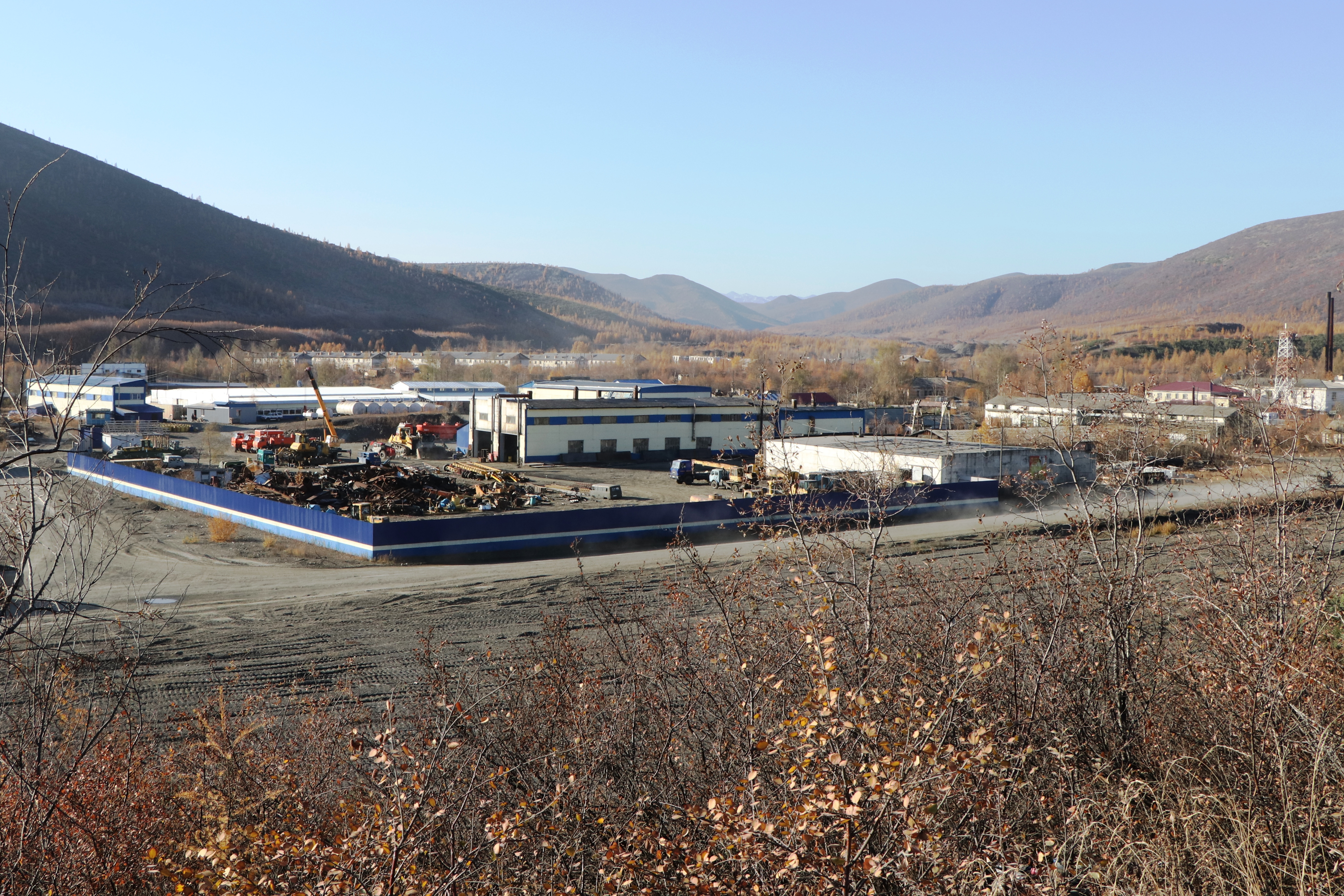
- Interactive map of Burkhala
- Location of Burkhala Burkhala (Magadan Oblast)
- Coordinates: 62.6487°N 149.1151°E
- Country: Russia
- Federal subject: Magadan Oblast
- Administrative district: Yagodninsky District

Population (2010 Census)
  - Total: 272
  - Estimate (2025): 62 (−77.2%)
- Time zone: UTC+11 (MSK+8)
- Postal code: 686242
- OKTMO ID: 44722000056

Burkhala (Russian: Бурхала) is an urban locality (an urban-type settlement) in Yagodninsky District of Magadan Oblast, Russia. Population: 272 (2010 census); 571 (2002 census); 1,827 (1989 Soviet census).

== Geography ==
The village lies in the Upper Kolyma region near the Debin river.
