= Nikolayevka, Jewish Autonomous Oblast =

Urban locality in Jewish Autonomous Oblast, Russia

Coordinates: 48°33′29″N 134°47′01″E

Nikolayevka is an urban locality (an urban-type settlement) in Smidovichsky District of the Jewish Autonomous Oblast, Russia. Population: 7,912 (2010 census); 7,650 (2002 census); 8,188 (1989 Soviet census).
