= Yagodnoye, Magadan Oblast =

Yagodnoye Я́годное
- Urban-type settlement
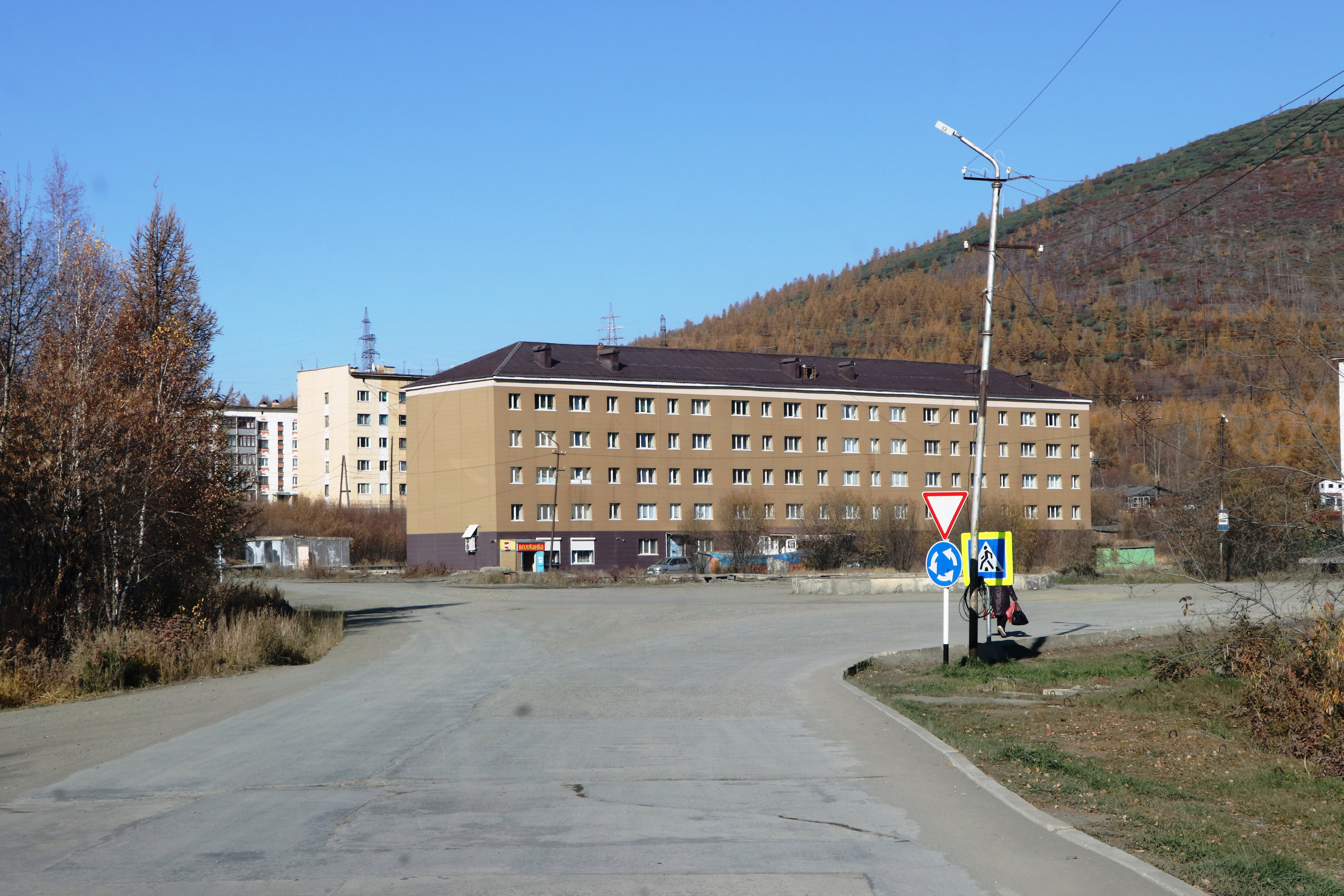

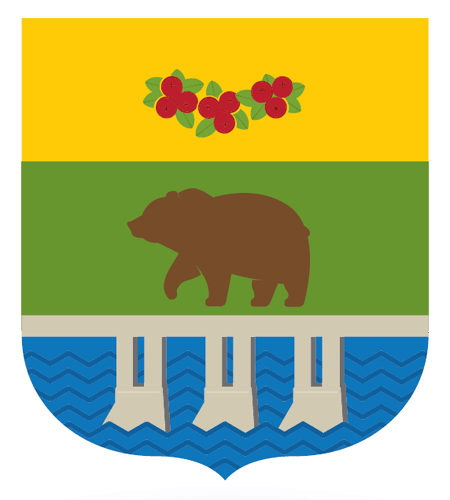
- Flag Coat of arms
- Interactive map of Yagodnoye
- Location of Yagodnoye Yagodnoye (Magadan Oblast)
- Coordinates: 62°31′15″N 149°37′15″E
- Country: Russia
- Federal subject: Magadan Oblast
- Administrative district: Yagodninsky District
- Founded: 1934
- Urban-type settlement status since: 1953

Population (2010 Census)
  - Total: 4,210
  - Estimate (2025): 2,745 (−34.8%)
- Time zone: UTC+11 (MSK+8)
- Postal code: 686230
- OKTMO ID: 44722000051

Yagodnoye (Russian: Я́годное) is an urban-type settlement in Magadan Oblast, Russia. Population: 4,210 (2010 census); 5,050 (2002 census); 11,024 (1989 Soviet census).

== Geography ==
The settlement lies in the south-eastern section of the Chersky Range, on the left bank of the Debin, a tributary of the Kolyma, by the mouth of the stream Yagodny. The oblast capital of Magadan lies approximately 340 km to the south-east in a direct line, although it is over 550 km by road.

== History ==
Yagodnoye was founded in 1934 in connection with the construction of the Kolyma Highway and the development of gold mining in the area. The town's name literally means "place rich in berries" and got its name from the local stream Yagodny (Ягодный).

From 1949 until 1957, the settlement housed the administration of the Sevlag Gulag forced labor camp, which was initially subordinated to Dalstroy. The camp housed up to 15,800 (in 1951) prisoners used in gold mining, road building, and timber felling.

With the creation of Yagodninsky District in 1953, Yagodnoye received urban-type settlement status.

== Economy and infrastructure ==
The main industry in the settlement remains gold mining, although this has declined significantly since the collapse of the Soviet Union. Other industries such as production of food and construction materials also suffered as a result, meaning that a large proportion of the town's population has left since the 1990s.

Magadan can be reached via the Kolyma Highway, with branch roads leading to the former mining settlements of Verkhny At-Uryakh, Taskan, and Elgen.

== Notable residents ==
- Diana Arbenina (*1974), singer from the band Nochniye Snaiperi, spent her childhood in Yagodnoye
- Olga Pershina (*1955 in Yagodnoye), folk and rock musician, author
- Varlam Shalamov (1907–1982), writer and Gulag survivor who spent over 15 years as a prisoner in the Kolyma region. He was tried in Yagodnoye in 1943.
- Yuri Shevchuk (*1957 in Yagodnoye), singer and rock musician
- Igor Vysotsky (*1953 in Yagodnoye), boxer
