= Volochayevka-2 =

Volochayevka-2 Волочаевка-2
- Urban-type settlement
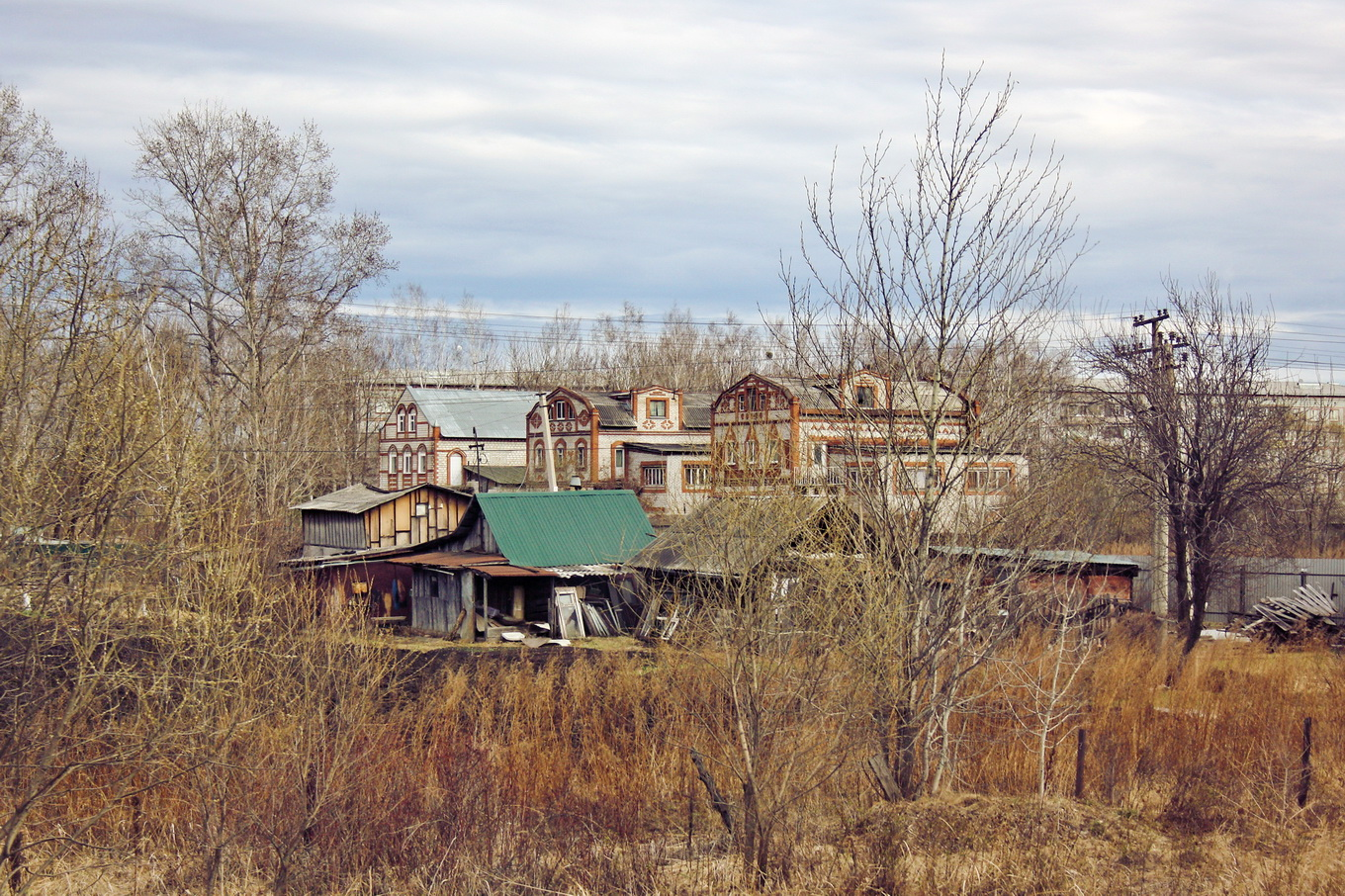

- Location within Jewish Autonomous Oblast Location within Russia
- Coordinates: 48°33′48″N 134°34′42″E
- Country: Russia
- Region: Jewish Autonomous Oblast
- District: Smidovichsky District

Population (2010)
  - Total: 1,937
- Time zone: UTC+10:00

Volochayevka-2 (Russian: Волочаевка-2) is an urban locality (an urban-type settlement) in Smidovichsky District of the Jewish Autonomous Oblast, Russia. Population: 1,937 (2010 census); 2,035 (2002 census); 2,060 (1989 Soviet census).
