= Priamursky =

Priamursky Приамурский
- Urban-type settlement
- Interactive map of Priamursky
- Location of Priamursky
- Coordinates: 48°31′39″N 134°54′47″E
- Country: Russia
- Federal subject: Jewish Autonomous Oblast

Population (2010 Census)
  - Total: 4,047
  - Estimate (2025): 3,110 (−23.2%)
- Time zone: UTC+10 (MSK+7)
- Postal code: 679180
- OKTMO ID: 99630165051

Priamursky is an urban locality (an urban-type settlement) in Smidovichsky District of the Jewish Autonomous Oblast, Russia. Population: 4,047 (2010 census); 3,675 (2002 census); 3,697 (1989 Soviet census).
