= Sokol, Magadan Oblast =

Sokol Со́кол
- Urban-type settlement
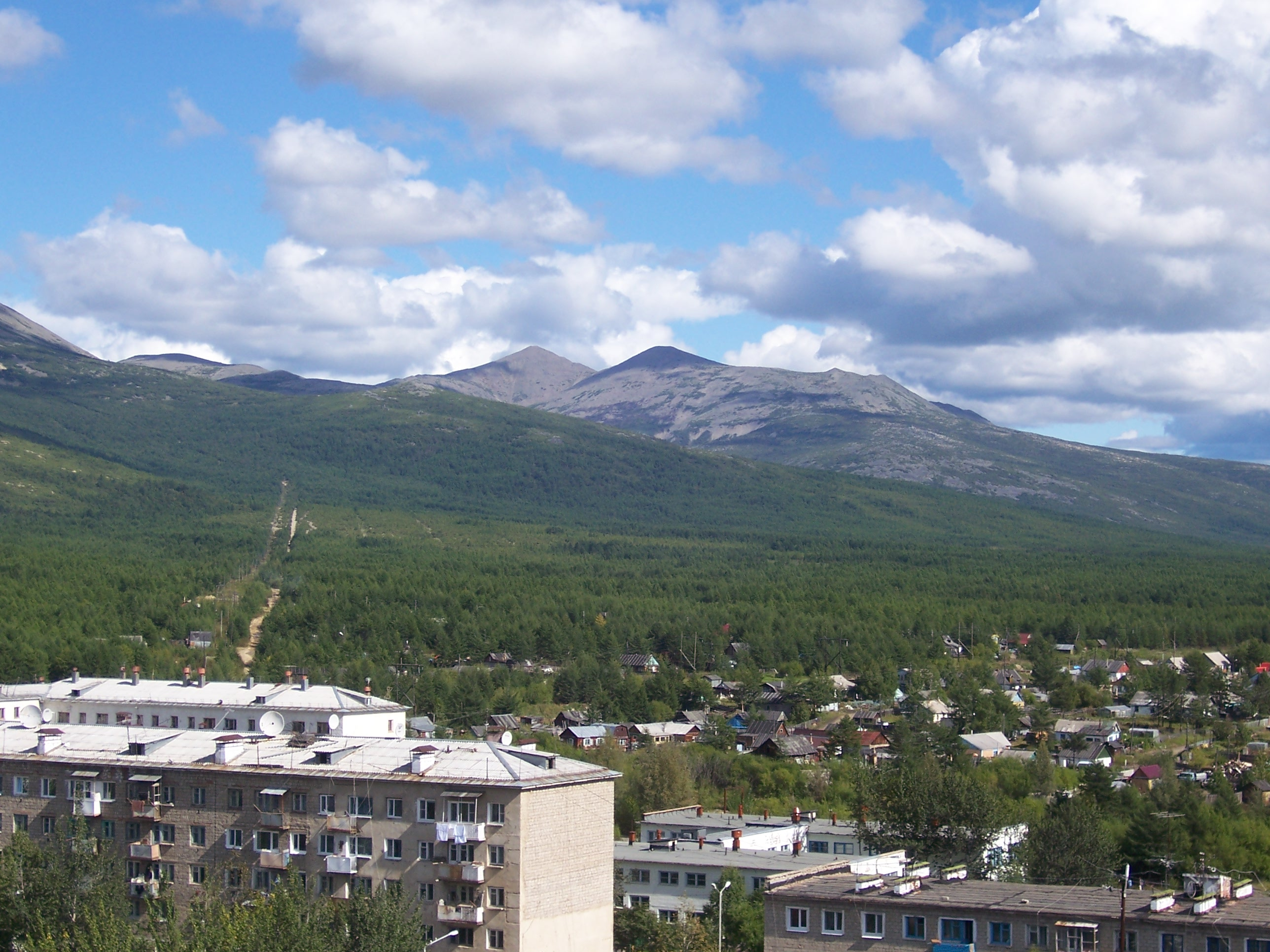

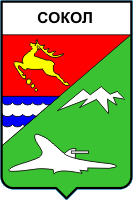
- Coat of arms
- Interactive map of Sokol
- Location of Sokol Sokol (Magadan Oblast)
- Coordinates: 59°55′N 150°45′E
- Country: Russia
- Federal subject: Magadan Oblast
- Administrative district: Magadan Urban Okrug
- Founded: 1962

Population (2010 Census)
  - Total: 4,685
  - Estimate (2025): 4,098 (−12.5%)
- Time zone: UTC+11 (MSK+8)
- Postal code: 685918
- OKTMO ID: 44701000056

Sokol (Russian: Со́кол) is an urban locality (an urban-type settlement) in Magadan Oblast, Russia, located 49 kilometers (30 mi) north of Magadan on the Kolyma Highway (federal highway M56) section connecting Magadan and Ust-Nera, and is also on the proposed rail link connecting the Amur–Yakutsk Mainline with Magadan. Population: 4,685 (2010 census); 4,715 (2002 census); 8,011 (1989 Soviet census).

== History ==
It was founded in 1962 and was granted urban-type settlement status in 1964. It is serving and housing the workers of the Sokol Airport.

== Transportation ==
It is the site of the Sokol Airport.
