= Verkhny At-Uryakh =

Verkhny At-Uryakh Верхний Ат-Урях
- Urban-type settlement
- Interactive map of Verkhny At-Uryakh
- Location of Verkhny At-Uryakh Verkhny At-Uryakh (Magadan Oblast)
- Coordinates: 62.6514°N 150.1039°E
- Country: Russia
- Federal subject: Magadan Oblast
- Administrative district: Yagodninsky District
- Elevation: 1,063 m (3,488 ft)

Population (2010 Census)
  - Total: 0
  - Estimate (2023): 0 )
- Time zone: UTC+11 (MSK+8)
- Postal code: 686250
- OKTMO ID: 44722000076

Verkhny At-Uryakh (Russian: Верхний Ат-Урях) is an urban locality (an urban-type settlement) in Yagodninsky District of Magadan Oblast, Russia. Population: 0 (2010 census); 61 (2002 census); 1,258 (1989 Soviet census).
