= Orotukan =

Orotukan Оротука́н
- Urban-type settlement
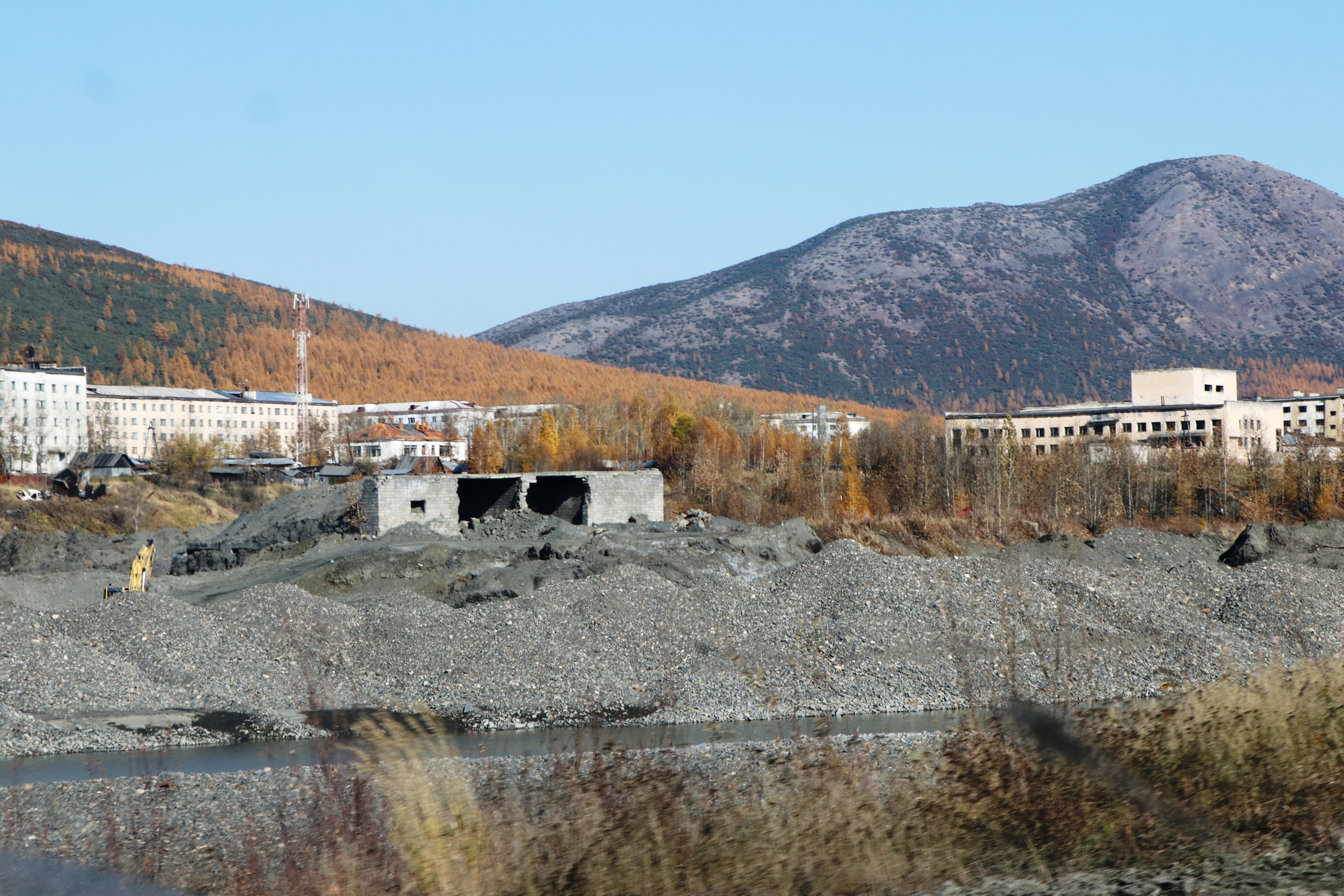
- Orotukan, 2021
- Interactive map of Orotukan
- Location of Orotukan Orotukan (Magadan Oblast)
- Coordinates: 62°15′52″N 151°40′13″E
- Country: Russia
- Federal subject: Magadan Oblast
- Administrative district: Yagodninsky District
- Founded: 1930

Population (2010 Census)
  - Total: 1,531
  - Estimate (2025): 903 (−41%)
- Time zone: UTC+11 (MSK+8)
- Postal code: 686210
- OKTMO ID: 44722000071

Orotukan (Russian: Оротука́н) is an urban locality (an urban-type settlement) in Yagodninsky District of Magadan Oblast, Russia, located in the Kolyma region about 300 kilometers (190 mi) north of Magadan, on the right bank of the Orotukan River (a tributary of the Kolyma). Its population has declined since the fall of the Soviet Union: 1,531 (2010 census); 2,760 (2002 census); 5,638 (1989 Soviet census).

== History ==
In 1931, as geologists found gold reserves in the valleys of the Kolyma region, they built a camp on the river close to present location of Orotukan. Shortly thereafter the construction of the Kolyma Highway (also known as the Road of Bones) began.

The settlement was founded on its present site in the mid-1930s. It received its name from the river, whose name came from the Yakut word өртөөһүн (örtööhün) meaning small burnt meadow or forest area. From 1935, a camp in the regional section of the gulag system operated by Dalstroy was located here.

In the 1940s, a repair work and factory for mining equipment were established. Orotukan was granted urban-type settlement status in 1953.

== Economy ==
During the Soviet era, the settlement was a center for gold mining and exploration.

=== Transportation ===
The settlement lies on the M56 Kolyma Highway, which runs from Magadan through Susuman in the northwestern part of Magadan Oblast and onto Yakutsk, although the road is only completely passable during winter when the rivers en route are frozen. The road distance between Orotukan and Magadan is about 400 kilometers (250 mi), and almost 1,500 kilometers (930 mi) to Yakutsk.

== Climate ==
Orotukan has a severe subarctic climate (Dfc).

== Notable people ==
- Tina Karol (b. 1985), pop singer
- Matvey Korobov (b. 1983), boxer
