= Preobrazheniye, Primorsky Krai =

Preobrazheniye Преображе́ние
- urban-type settlement
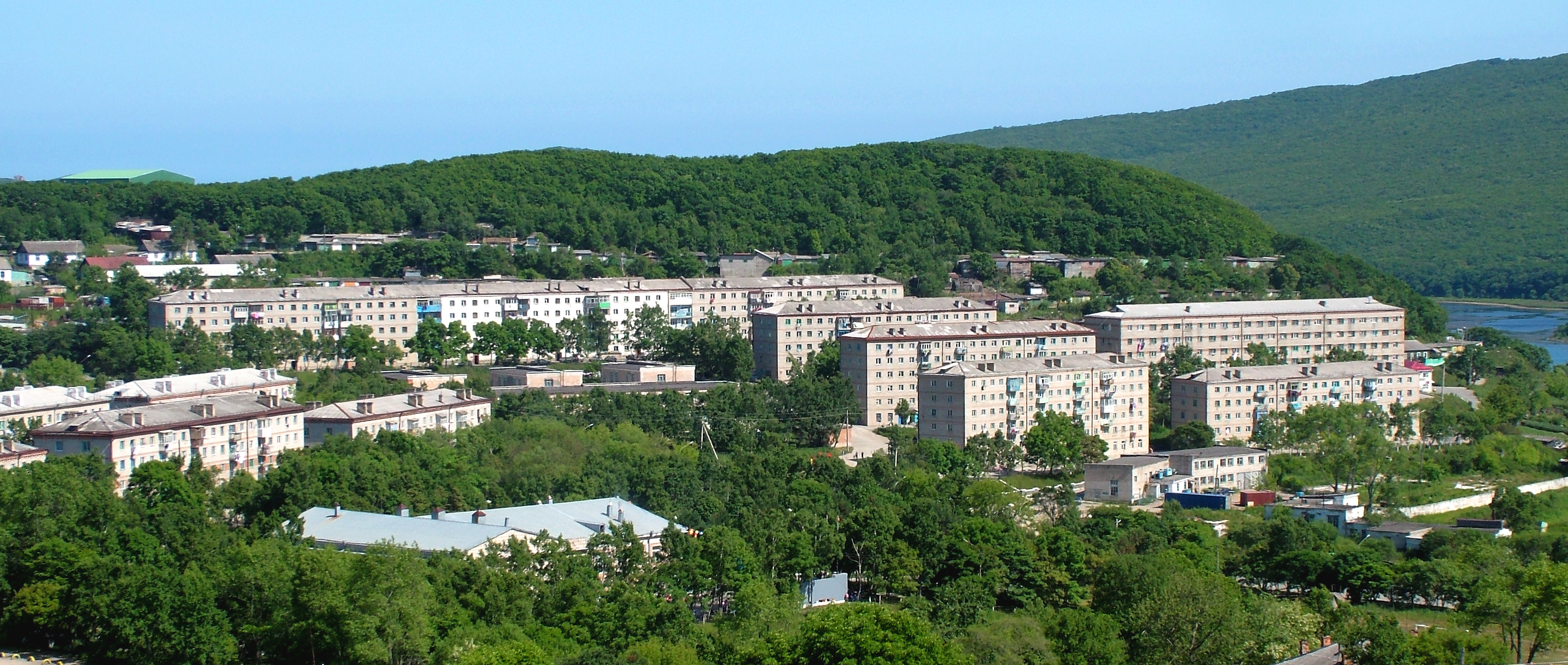

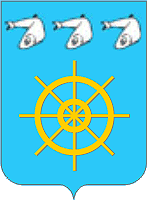
- Coat of arms

- Location within Russia Location within Primorsky Krai
- Coordinates: 42°53′N 133°53′E
- Country: Russia
- District: Lazovsky
- Town: Preobrazhenskoe
- Founded: 19 August 1860

Population (2017)
  - Total: 6,538
- Time zone: UTC+10:00 (VLAT)
- Postcode: 692998
- Website: www.preobrprim.ru

Preobrazheniye (Russian: Преображе́ние) is an urban locality (an urban-type settlement) in Lazovsky District of Primorsky Krai, Russia, located on the Preobrazheniye Bay of the Sea of Japan. Population: 7,184 (2010 census); 9,335 (2002 census); 12,213 (1989 Soviet census).

== History ==
Founded on August 19, 1860 on the day of Transfiguration of Jesus, it was named "Preobrazheniye" (meaning transfiguration in Russian) after the event.

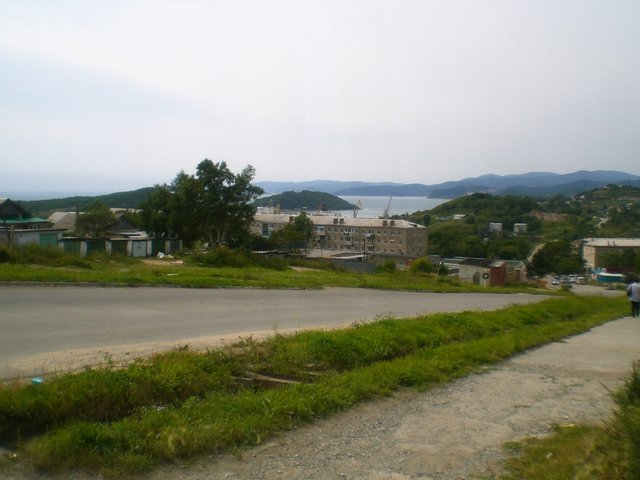
Settlement of the Preobrazheniye, Primorsky Krai. View from the southern hill.

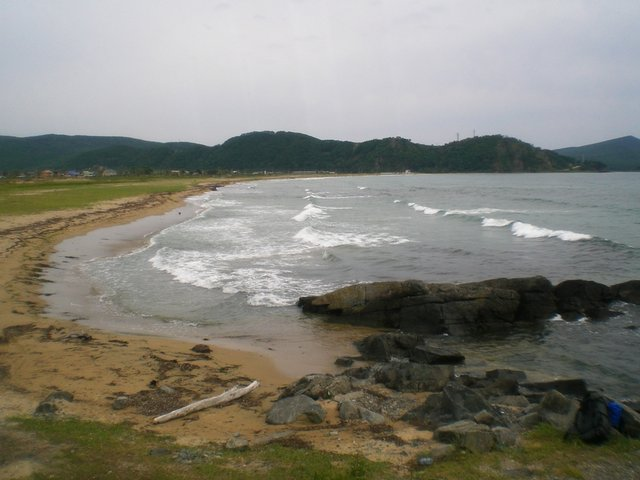
Sokolovskaya Bay.

== Economy ==
The main enterprise of the settlement is Preobrazhenskaya Base of Trawling Fleet (Преображенская база тралового флота).

== Population ==
Population Progression

Year	Pop.	±%
1970	7,768	—
1979	10,571	+36.1%
1989	12,213	+15.5%
2002	9,335	−23.6%
2008	8,681	−7.0%
2009	8,554	−1.5%
2010	7,184	−16.0%

Year	Pop.	±%
2012	7,085	−1.4%
2013	6,992	−1.3%
2014	6,861	−1.9%
2015	6,724	−2.0%
2016	6,617	−1.6%
2017	6,538	−1.2%

Source data

== Climate ==
The climate of Preobrazheniye is monsoon climate, which is moderately warm and humid. Because of the influence of the Primorskoye Current, the winter is warmer than in the continental regions of the region, and the summer is cooler. The warmest months of the year are July, August and September. Spring is long and cool. Autumn, as a rule, comes somewhat slower than in the mainland regions of Russia. The average number of sunshine hours reaches 2,400, with most of them occurring in the winter, while the summer is characterized by a predominance of cloudy weather.

- The average annual air temperature is 5.9 °C
- The record maximum of 34.0 ° С
- The record minimum of -28.5 ° С
- The relative air humidity is 67%, which is less than in Astrakhan (70%), Khabarovsk (72%) and St. Petersburg (78%)
- The average wind speed is 3.3 m/s

Climate data for Preobrazheniye (1981-2010)
Month	Jan	Feb	Mar	Apr	May	Jun	Jul	Aug	Sep	Oct	Nov	Dec	Year
Record high °C	9.9	10.6	19.1	23.6	29.4	31.8	31.0	33.6	30.1	23.6	19.3	11.4	33.6
Daily mean °C	−7.6	−5.3	−0.5	4.8	8.7	12.6	17.1	19.8	16.1	9.5	1.4	−5.2	6.0
Record low °C	−25.5	−25.3	−19.1	−9.1	−1.9	0.5	6.3	9.0	−1.3	−9.4	−20.4	−27.4	−27.4
Average precipitation mm	14	17	29	48	65	83	133	135	114	55	41	23	757
Record high °F	49.8	51.1	66.4	74.5	84.9	89.2	87.8	92.5	86.2	74.5	66.7	52.5	92.5
Daily mean °F	18.3	22.5	31.1	40.6	47.7	54.7	62.8	67.6	61.0	49.1	34.5	22.6	42.8
Record low °F	−13.9	−13.5	−2.4	15.6	28.6	32.9	43.3	48.2	29.7	15.1	−4.7	−17.3	−17.3
Average precipitation inches	0.6	0.7	1.1	1.9	2.6	3.3	5.2	5.3	4.5	2.2	1.6	0.9	29.8
Source 1:
Source 2:

Climate data for Preobrazheniye
Month	Jan	Feb	Mar	Apr	May	Jun	Jul	Aug	Sep	Oct	Nov	Dec	Year
Record high °C	5.9	9.0	13.8	23.6	28.6	34.0	33.9	31.3	28.8	23.6	16.2	10.6	34.0
Mean daily maximum °C	−2.7	−0.2	3.7	9.6	13.3	17.6	20.1	23.5	20.9	14.5	5.3	−1.3	10.3
Daily mean °C	−7.8	−5.3	−0.5	4.6	8.7	12.3	17.0	19.6	15.7	9.3	1.6	−5	5.9
Mean daily minimum °C	−11.1	−8.5	−4.1	1.6	5.7	10.2	14.9	17.1	12.3	5.7	−2.8	−9.9	2.6
Record low °C	−24.1	−28.5	−19.7	−5.3	−0.7	4.0	9.6	9.7	−1.4	−6.1	−16.4	−26	−28.5
Record high °F	42.6	48.2	56.8	74.5	83.5	93.2	93.0	88.3	83.8	74.5	61.2	51.1	93.2
Mean daily maximum °F	27.1	31.6	38.7	49.3	55.9	63.7	68.2	74.3	69.6	58.1	41.5	29.7	50.5
Daily mean °F	18.0	22.5	31.1	40.3	47.7	54.1	62.6	67.3	60.3	48.7	34.9	23	42.6
Mean daily minimum °F	12.0	16.7	24.6	34.9	42.3	50.4	58.8	62.8	54.1	42.3	27.0	14.2	36.7
Record low °F	−11.4	−19.3	−3.5	22.5	30.7	39.2	49.3	49.5	29.5	21.0	2.5	−15	−19.3
Mean monthly sunshine hours	201	197	229	210	223	166	161	194	213	222	183	184	2,383
