= Uptar =

Uptar Уптар
- Urban-type settlement
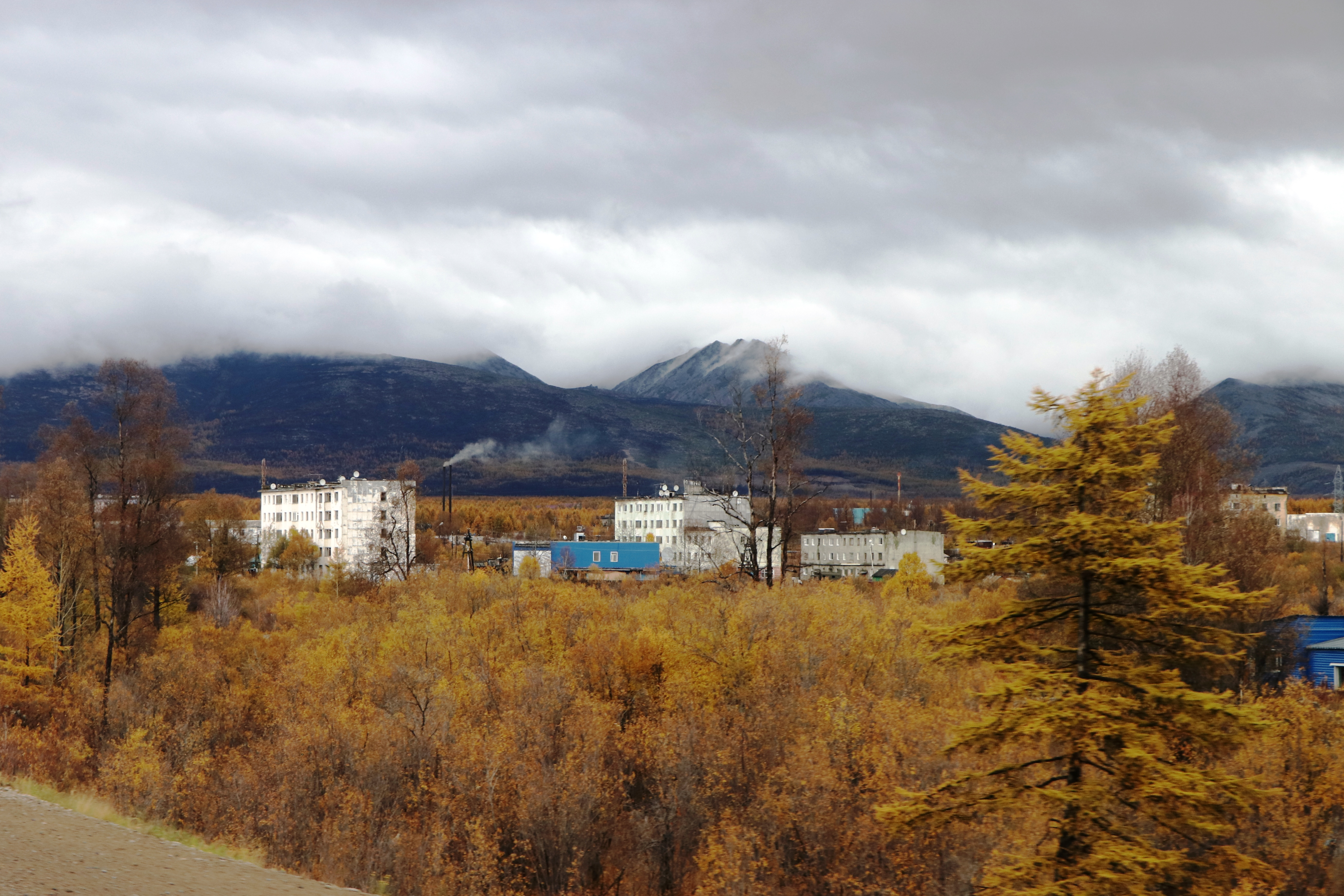

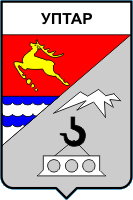
- Coat of arms
- Interactive map of Uptar
- Location of Uptar Uptar (Magadan Oblast)
- Coordinates: 59°53′56″N 150°52′18″E
- Country: Russia
- Federal subject: Magadan Oblast
- Founded: 1932

Population (2010 Census)
  - Total: 1,991
  - Estimate (2024): 1,676 (−15.8%)
- Time zone: UTC+11 (MSK+8)
- Postal code: 685902
- OKTMO ID: 44701000061

Uptar (Russian: Уптар) is an urban locality (an urban-type settlement) under the administrative jurisdiction of the Town of Magadan in Magadan Oblast, Russia. Population: 1,991 (2010 census); 2,311 (2002 census);
