= R504 Kolyma Highway =

Road in eastern Russia

Coordinates: 59°35′18″N 150°49′54″E

Federal Highway R504
- Федеральная автомобильная дорога Р504
- Kolyma Highway
- The Kolyma Highway and others in the region. The Kolyma Highway is shown in red.
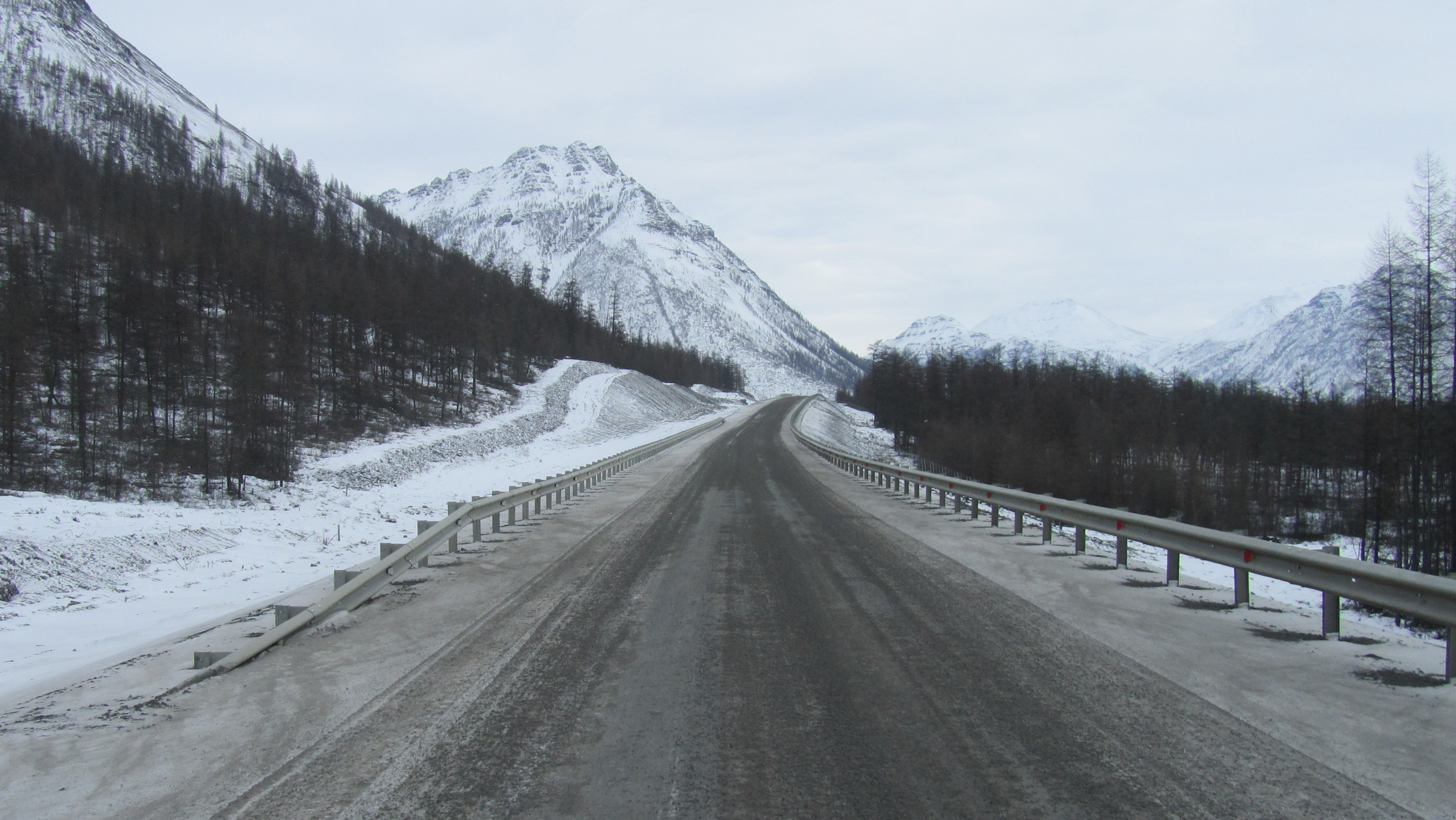

Route information
- Length: 2,031 km (1,262 mi)

Major junctions
- West end: A 360 A360 Lena Highway at Nizhny Bestyakh
- East end: Magadan

Location
- Country: Russia

Highway system
- Russian Federal Highways
← R 503	→ R 600

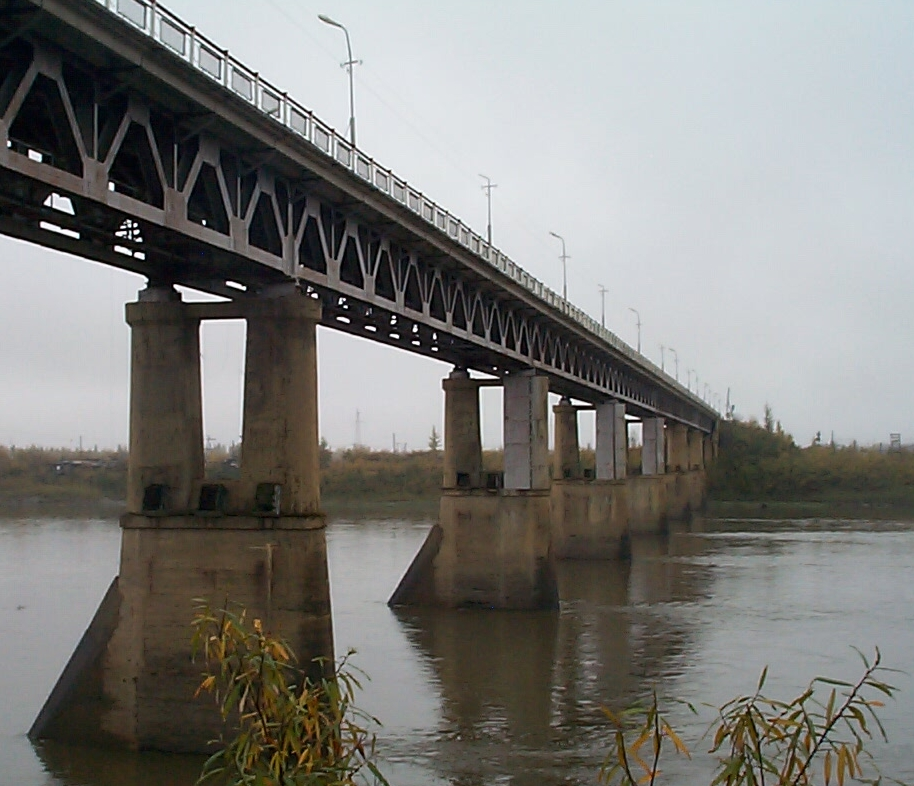
Kolyma River Bridge at Debin

The R504 Kolyma Highway (Russian: Федеральная автомобильная дорога «Колыма», Federal'naya Avtomobil'naya Doroga «Kolyma», "Federal Automobile Highway 'Kolyma'"), part of the M56 route, is a road through the Russian Far East. It connects Magadan with the town of Nizhny Bestyakh, located on the eastern bank of the Lena River, opposite of Yakutsk. At Nizhny Bestyakh the Kolyma Highway connects to the Lena Highway.

The Kolyma Highway has been colloquially called the Road of Bones (Russian: Дорога Костей Doróga Kostéy). Locally, the road is known as the Kolyma Route (Russian: Колымская трасса Kolýmskaya trássa).

== History ==
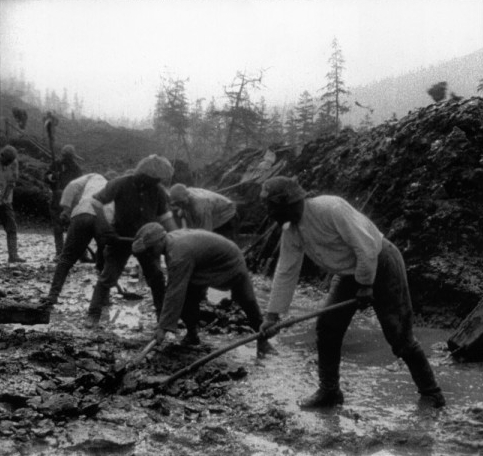
Road construction

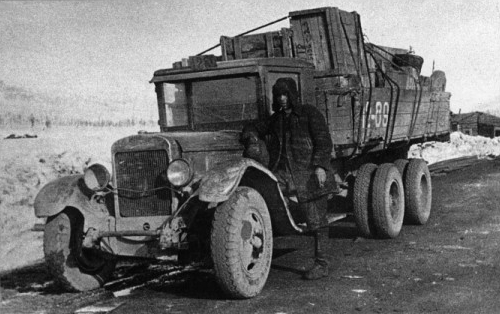
A ZIS-6 Lorry in 1938

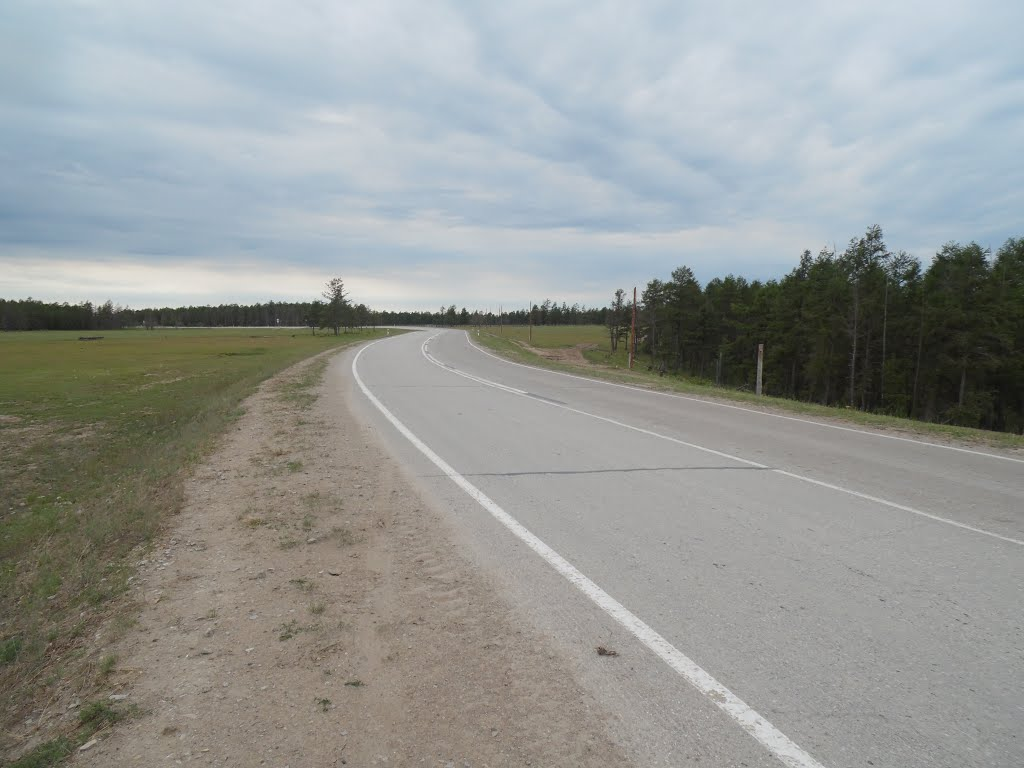
The Kolyma is paved 159 km. from Yakutsk (Nizhny Bestyakh) to Churapcha.

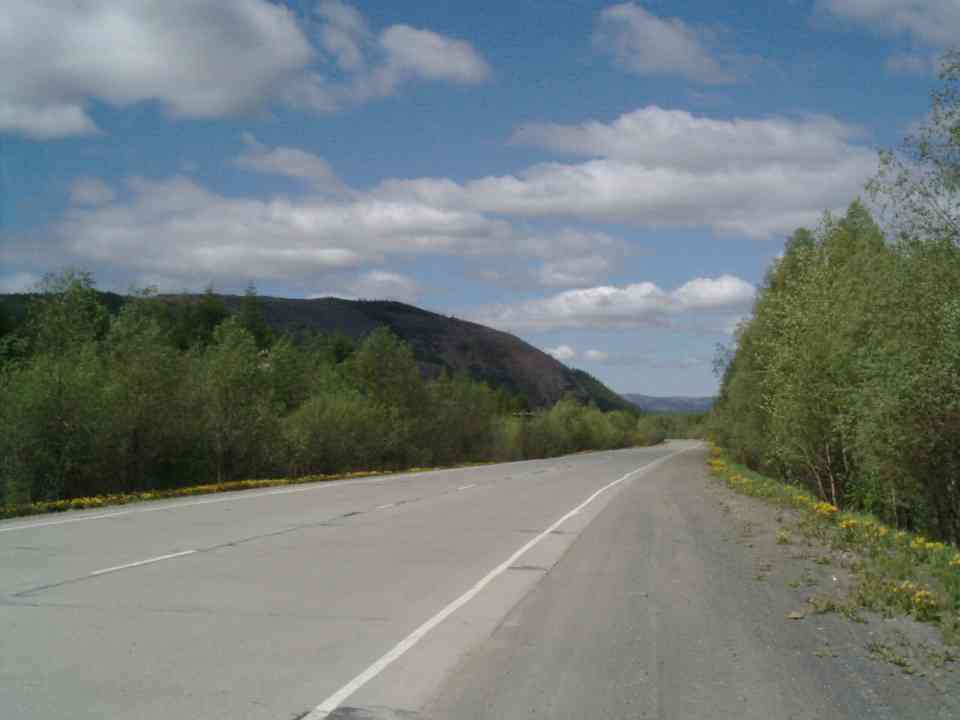
The road today near Magadan. Paving extends over the 159 km nearest to Magadan; elsewhere the road mainly comprises gravel.

The Dalstroy construction directorate built the Kolyma Highway during the Soviet Union's Stalinist era. Inmates of the Sevvostlag labour camp started the first stretch in 1932, and construction continued with the use of gulag labor until 1953.

It has been widely claimed that an estimated 250,000–1,000,000 imprisoned laborers who died while constructing it were laid beneath or around the road, although documented sources have yet to confirm this with evidence of remains. As the road is built on permafrost, the popular rumor spread through western and dissident accounts is that interment into the fabric of the road was deemed more practical than digging new holes to bury the bodies of the dead.

Records indicate 10,251 people died in the Kolyma region prison system in 1938 from various official causes, mainly disease. The CIA's initial 1950s estimate of 3 million victims is stated to be flawed in Martin Bollinger's book on Kolyma prison labor. Norman Polmar's review of that book refers to 130,000 deaths.

== Present ==
In 2008, the road was granted Federal Road status and is now a frequently maintained all-weather gravel road.

When the road was upgraded, the route was changed to bypass the section from Kyubeme to Kadykchan via Tomtor, and instead pass from Kyubeme to Kadykchan via a more northern route through the town of Ust-Nera. The old 420 km section via Tomtor was largely unmaintained; the 200 km section between Tomtor and Kadykchan was completely abandoned. This section is known as the Old Summer Road, and has fallen into disrepair, with washed-out bridges and sections of road reclaimed by streams in summer. During winter, frozen rivers may assist river crossings. Old Summer Road remains one of the great challenges for adventuring motorcyclists and 4WDers.

The area is extremely cold during the winter. The town of Oymyakon, approximately 100 km from the highway, is believed to be the coldest inhabited place on earth. The average low temperature in Oymyakon in January is −58°F. In 2020, a teenage motorist froze to death by following Google Maps directions to use the shorter but abandoned section of the road via Tomtor, on which his car broke down, and his surviving travel mate lost most of his limbs due to frostbite.

== Route ==
Distance	Place	Remark
0 km	Nizhny Bestyakh / Yakutsk	on the Lena River
159 km (100 mi)	Churapcha	end of paving. Will reach Ytyk-Kyuyol in 2025.
350 km (220 mi)	Krest-Khaldzhay	road, northeast, summer ferry across the Aldan River. Bridge planned for 2029.
380 km (240 mi)	Khandyga	on the Aldan River
	alternative: Summer Hydrofoil from Yakutsk down the Lena and up the Aldan, 530 km (330 mi), 10 hours	
	over Suntar-Khayata mountains, 1,200 m (3,940 ft) pass, Vostochnaya River	
700 km (430 mi)	Kyubeme	
940 km (580 mi)	(New route) Ust-Nera	on the Indigirka River, east: several mining towns, Artyk town, headwaters of the Nera River, 1,452 m (4,760 ft) pass
	alternative: (Old Summer Road route) 155 km (100 mi) northeast to Tomtor, 250 km (160 mi) road northeast (may not be passable except when frozen), into Magadan Oblast	
1,240 km (770 mi)	Kadykchan	(nearby are coal mines and the old Myaundzha uranium processing centre)
1,330 km (830 mi)	Susuman	
1,500 km (930 mi)	Debin	with the Kolyma River bridge
1,680 km (1,040 mi)	Orotukan	road turns southeast and south 300 km (190 mi) of largely unpopulated taiga
1,759 km (1,090 mi)	Gerba	road 44H-3 to Omsukchan forks off; beginning of Anadyr Highway
1,830 km (1,140 mi)	Atka	enters lowlands
1,926 km (1,200 mi)	Yablonevyy	pavement recommences
1,950 km (1,210 mi)	Palatka	
1,980 km (1,230 mi)	Sokol	
2,030 km (1,260 mi)	Magadan	

There is also a scenic shortcut from Magadan to Susuman via Ust-Omchug called the Tenkinskaya Trassa, which receives a lot less heavy traffic than the main section of the M56 between Magadan and Susuman.

Distances: Yakutsk to Khandyga 380 km (240 mi), on to Kyubeme 320 km (200 mi), to Kadykchan (via Tomtor) 420 km (260 mi), Kadykchan to Susuman 90 km (60 mi), Susuman to Magadan 630 km (390 mi). From Kyubeme to Kadykchan north via Ust-Nera (the new, maintained section) is about 650 km (400 mi).

As of 2026, the Old Summer Road east of Tomtor is not passable anymore in the summer, as a section of the bridge over the Indigirka River has been swept away by floods.

== Road to Chukotka ==
The Anadyr Highway project from the Kolyma Highway to Anadyr in Chukotka passes Omsukchan, Omolon, and Ilirney with branch roads to Bilibino and Egvekinot, involving construction of 1,800 kilometres (1,100 mi) of road. The construction of the first 50 kilometers of the road started in 2012.

== See also ==
- Gulag
- Amur Cart Road
