= Yagodninsky District =

Yagodninsky District Ягоднинский район (Russian)
- District
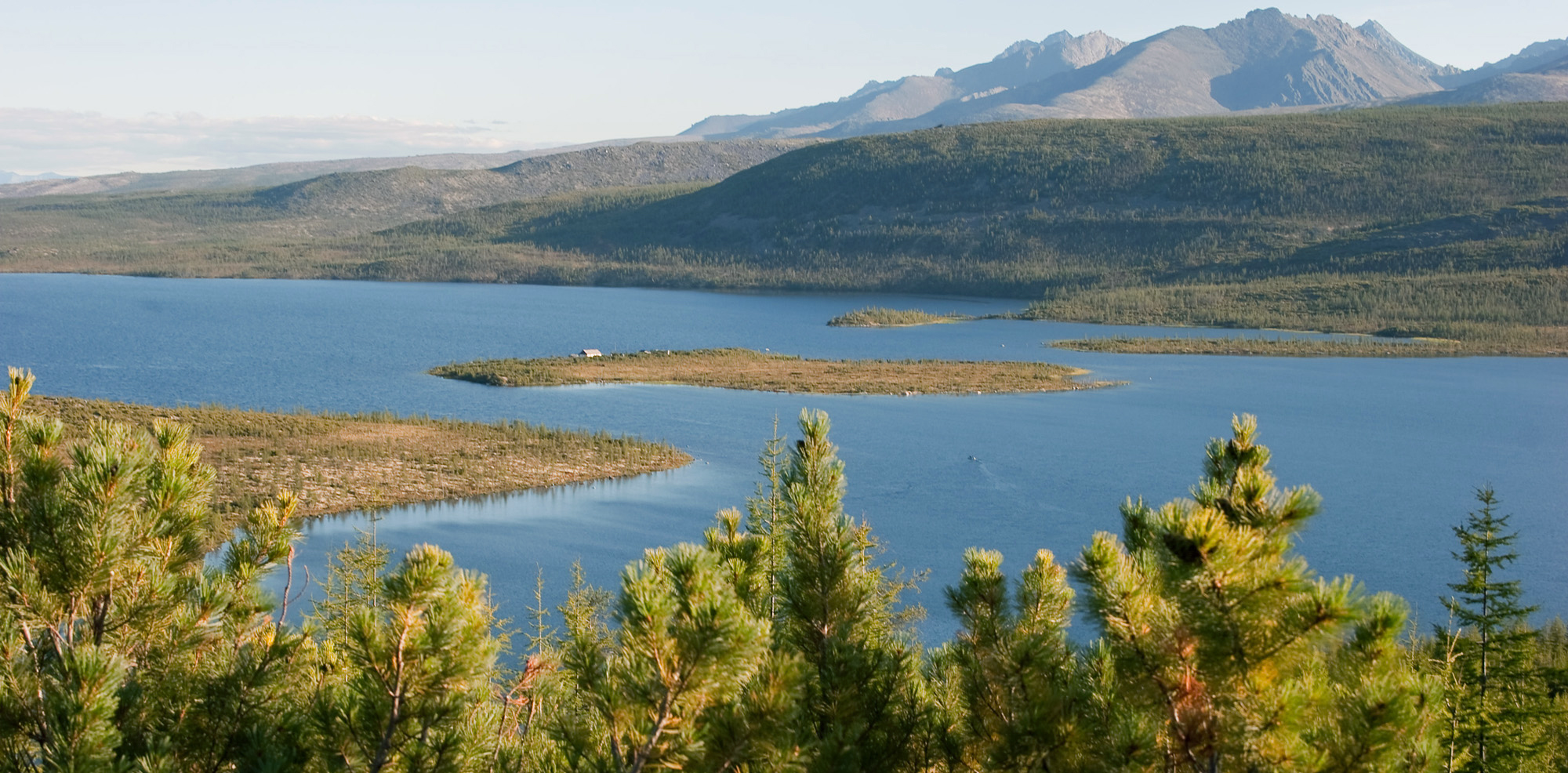
- Jack London Lake, Yagodninsky District

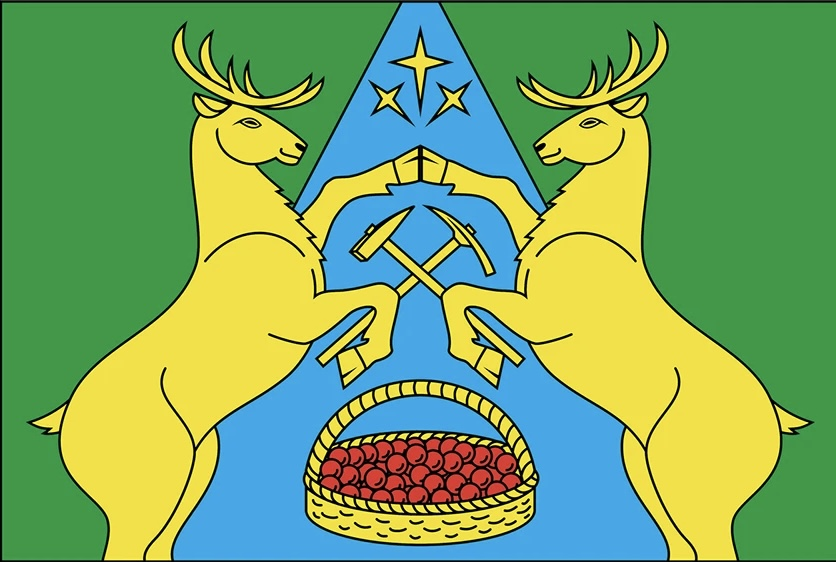
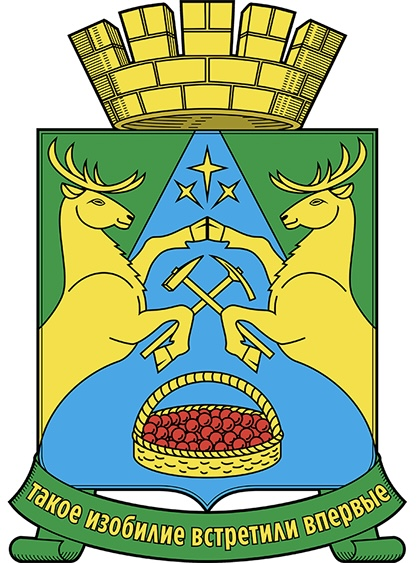
- Flag Coat of arms
- Location of Yagodninsky District in Magadan Oblast
- Coordinates: 62°40′N 151°20′E
- Country: Russia
- Federal subject: Magadan Oblast
- Established: 1953
- Administrative center: Yagodnoye

Area
  - Total: 29,500 km^{2} (11,400 sq mi)

Population (2010 Census)
  - Total: 9,839
  - Estimate (1 January 2017): 7,848
  - Density: 0.334/km^{2} (0.864/sq mi)
  - Urban: 97.2%
  - Rural: 2.8%

Administrative structure
  - Inhabited localities: 6 urban-type settlements, 11 rural localities

Municipal structure
  - Municipally incorporated as: Yagodninsky Municipal District
  - Municipal divisions: 5 urban settlements, 1 rural settlements
- Time zone: UTC+11 (MSK+8)
- OKTMO ID: 44722000
- Website: http://yagodnoeadm.ru/

Yagodninsky District (Russian: Я́годнинский райо́н) is an administrative and municipal district (raion), one of the eight in Magadan Oblast, Russia. It is located in the western central part of the oblast. The area of the district is 29,500 square kilometers (11,400 sq mi). Its administrative center is the urban locality (an urban-type settlement) of Yagodnoye. Population: 9,839 (2010 census); 15,833 (2002 Census); 50,174 (1989 Soviet census). The population of Yagodnoye accounts for 42.8% of the district's total population.

== Geography ==
The district borders with Susumansky District in the north, Srednekansky District in the east, Khasynsky District in the south, and with Tenkinsky District in the west. There are a number of abandoned villages in the district, such as Taskan, Elgen and Ust-Taskan.

The most important rivers of the district are the Kolyma, Debin, Orotukan, Taskan, Bakhapcha and Kongo.

== See also ==
- Kolyma Reservoir
