= Stekolny =

Stekolny (masculine), Stekolnaya (feminine), or Stekolnoye (neuter) may refer to:

- Stekolny, Magadan Oblast, an urban-type settlement in Magadan Oblast, Russia
- Stekolny, Republic of Tatarstan, a settlement in the Republic of Tatarstan, Russia
