= Stekolny, Magadan Oblast =

Stekolny Стекольный
- Urban-type settlement
- Interactive map of Stekolny
- Location of Stekolny Stekolny (Magadan Oblast)
- Coordinates: 60.0429°N 150.7434°E
- Country: Russia
- Federal subject: Magadan Oblast
- Administrative district: Khasynsky District
- Founded: 1941

Population (2010 Census)
  - Total: 2,023
  - Estimate (2025): 2,201 (+8.8%)
- Time zone: UTC+11 (MSK+8)
- Postal code: 686134
- OKTMO ID: 44719000065

Stekolny (Russian: Стекольный) is an urban locality (an urban-type settlement) in Khasynsky District of Magadan Oblast, Russia. Population: 2,023 (2010 census); 2,260 (2002 census); 4,843 (1989 Soviet census).

== Geography ==
The settlement is located 10 km (6.2 mi) to the southwest of Palatka, by the bank of river Kadykchan, close to its confluence with the Khasyn.
