= Butugychag =

Tin, gold and uranium mine in North-Eastern Russia

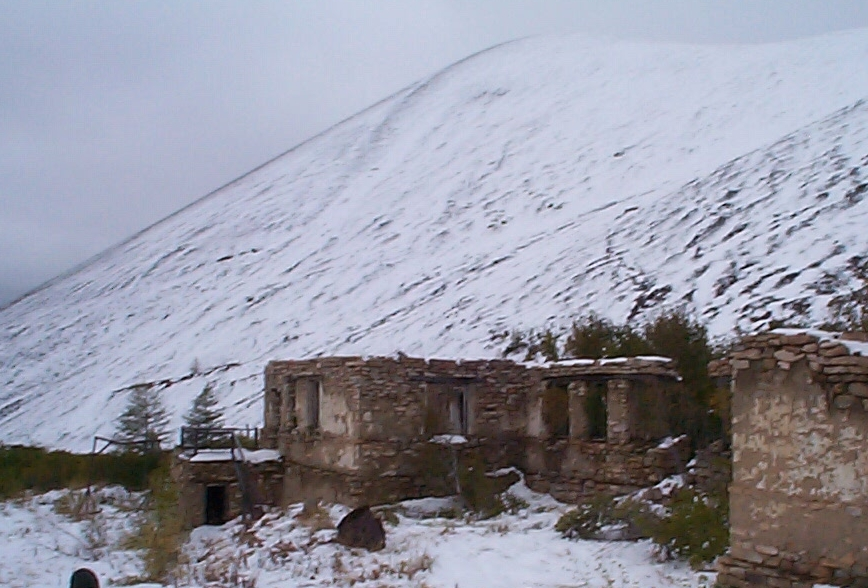
- Remains of the Butugychag tin mine.

- Location in Magadan Oblast

Location
- Location: Kolyma Mountains, Tenkin District, Magadan Oblast, Russia; 61°19′00″N 149°11′20″E

Production
- Products: tin, gold and uranium

History
- Opened: 1937
- Closed: 1956

Owner
- Company: Tenlag, a branch of Dalstroy

Butugychag (Russian: Бутугычаг) was a tin, gold and uranium mine and a former forced labour camp in the Kolyma region of North-Eastern Russia, present-day Magadan Oblast.

== Forced Labor Camp ==
The Butugychag Corrective Labor Camp (Russian: исправительно-трудовой лагерь, Бутугычаг, romanized: ispravitel'no-trudovoy lager', Butugychag) was part of the bigger Berlag, a subdivision of GULAG. The camp existed during 1945–1955 . The camp is mostly known for its deadly uranium extraction. It is mentioned by some Russian historians such as Anatoly Zhigulin. It is one of a small number of camps where prisoners mined uranium, the truth of which has only recently been recovered.

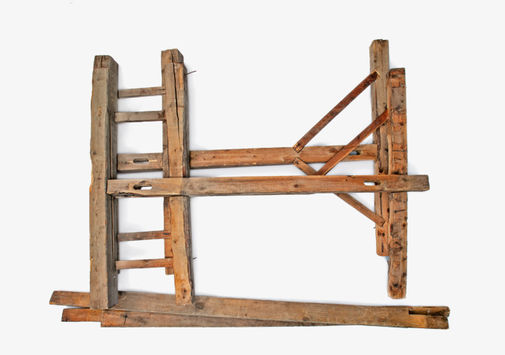
Part of a prisoner's bunk

The camp's main activity was the mining of various types of ore, including tin, gold, and uranium. The camp also contained a top secret research-medical facility where a series of experiments were conducted on camp inmates. Witnesses of the camp state that the camp took the life of some 380,000 people in the 10 years of its existence, despite a maximum capacity of 31,500 only having been reached in 1952. Uranium mining was conducted manually without any protective gear, resulting in severe occupational risks to prisoners. The average miner's life span was less than a year, and radiation levels in the area are still elevated. The administration of the Tenkinsky District installed warning signs around the area as a precaution against trespassers.

=== Cemetery ===
As of 2017 in surroundings of the camp a local improvised cemetery with around 250 graves of prisoners can be found.

== Legend ==
In local folklore, the area is known as Death Valley. This name was given to the area by the nomadic tribes that domesticated and raised deer in the area. As they travelled along the Detrin River, they stumbled upon a huge field filled with human skulls and bones. Soon after, their deer became ill with a mysterious disease; the first symptom was loss of fur on their legs, followed by lack of energy and refusal to walk. This name was passed on to Beria's camps of the 14th department of GULAG.

The settlement has only recently come to light, and is not even listed among the abandoned camps as though it never existed. The remains of the camp can still be found about 55 km (34 mi) north of Ust-Omchug near the Tenkin highway. There are two abandoned settlements in the area located near each other (10 kilometres): Butugychag was the camp itself where prisoners were kept, and Lower Butugychag, which housed the servicemen of the local electric substation. In 1955 when the camp was shut down, Lower Butugychag was abandoned and its population was moved to Ust-Omchug.

Located nearby (8 kilometres) is an abandoned chicken farm, which was left uncompleted and under construction due to the high concentration of radiation.

All the roads to the area have deteriorated, making it difficult to find the settlement and, thus, to reach it. The only practical way to get to the area is by a cross-country vehicle or by air transportation.

== Gallery ==
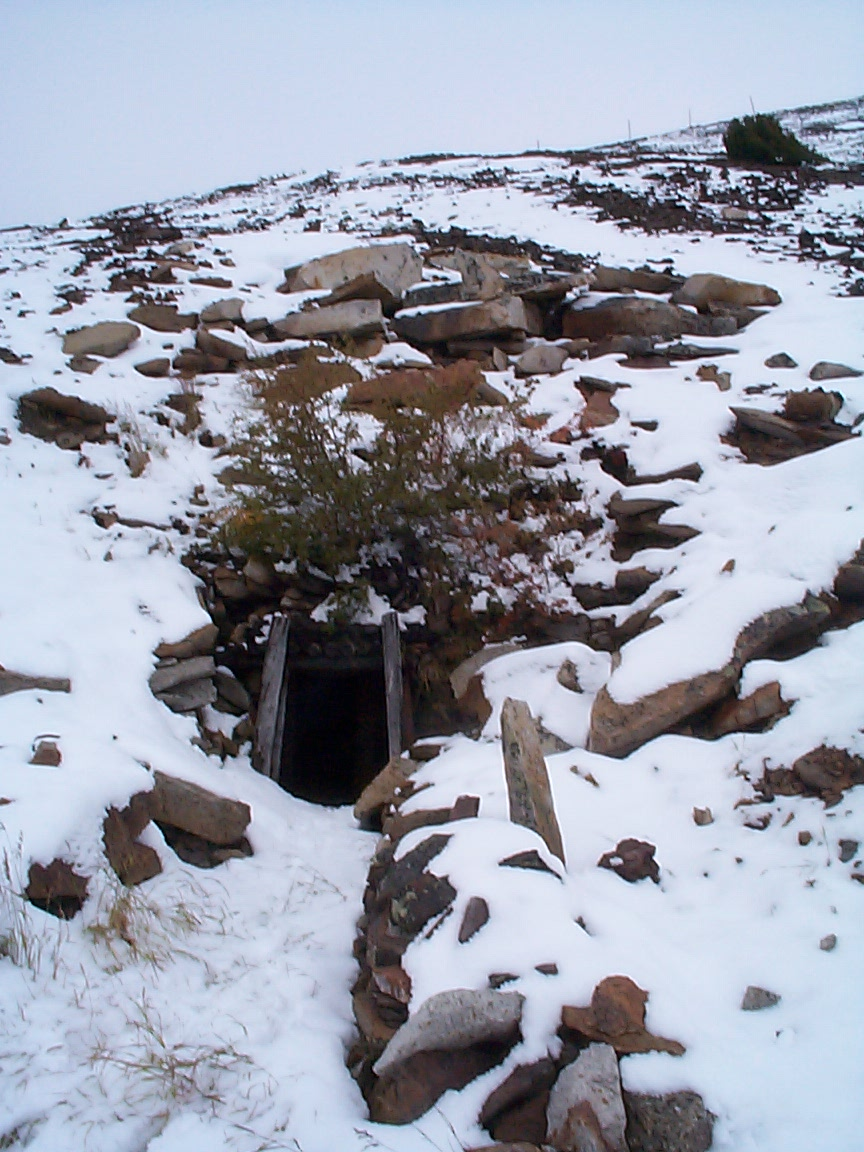
A mine adit in the hillside

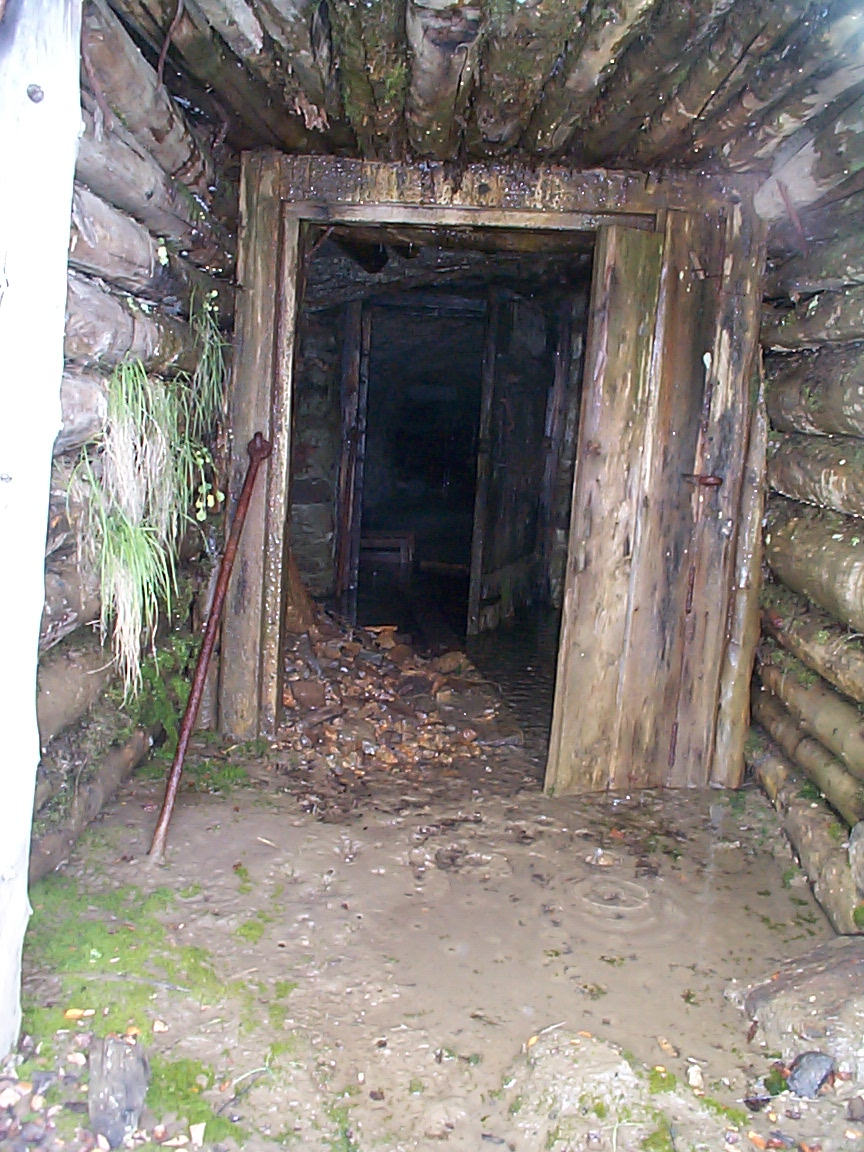
Doors on adit. Bar locks the doors from the outside.

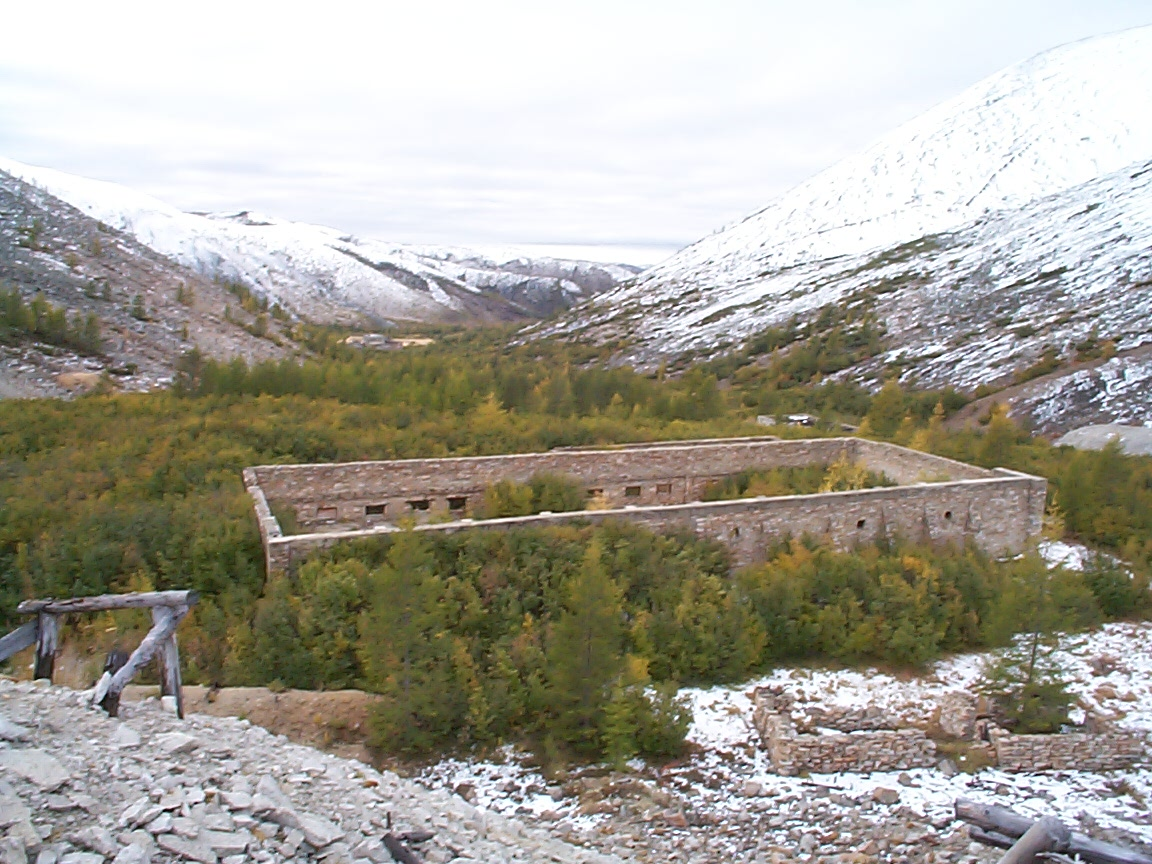
Remains of metallurgical mill

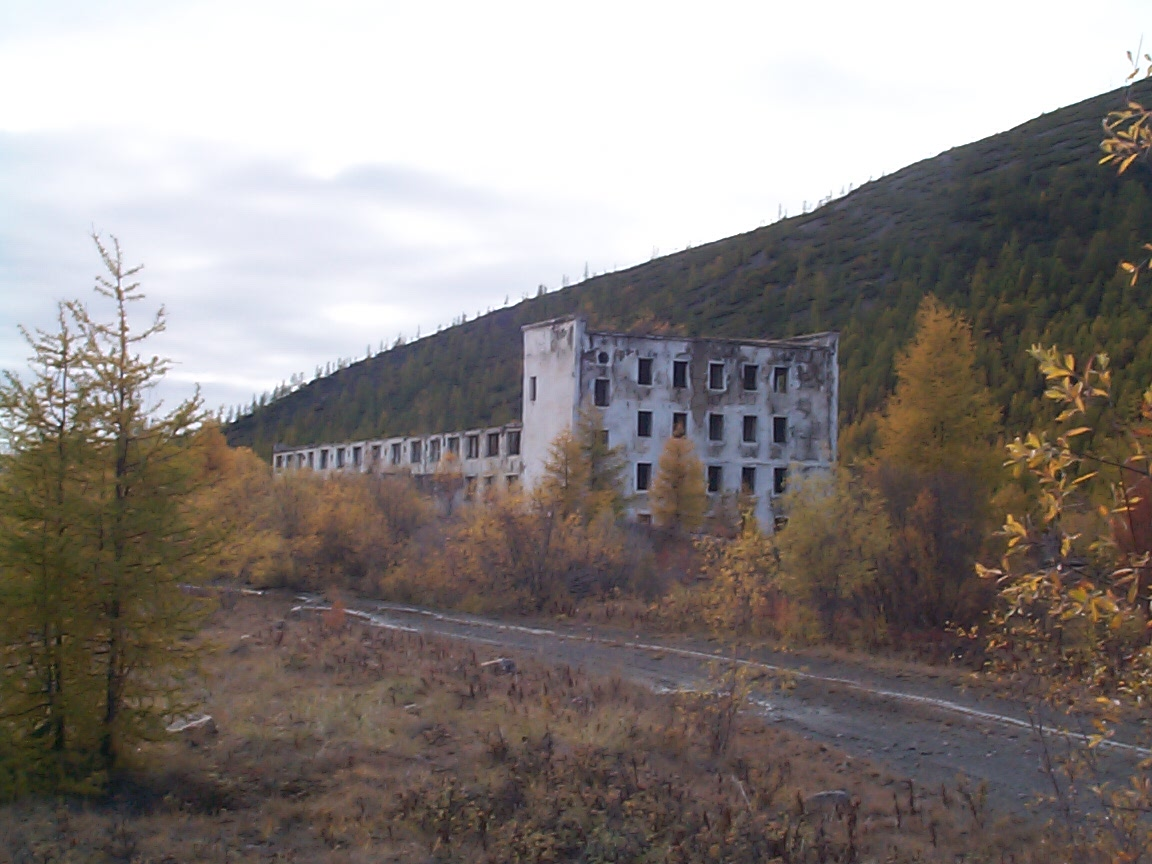
Administration block

== See also ==
- Kolyma
