= Arman, Russia =

Arman Армань
- Settlement
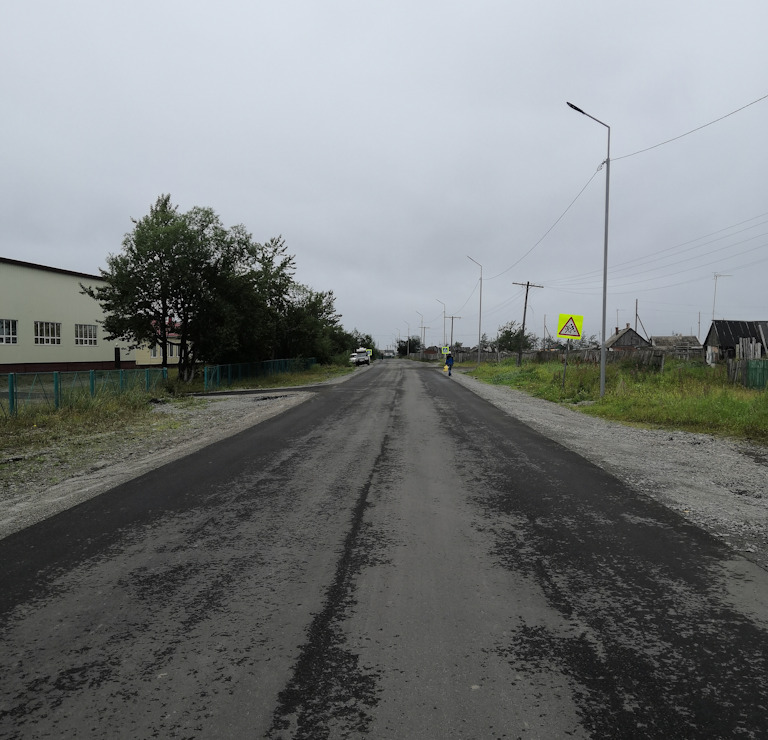
- Mayakovskogo street with the school on the leftside.

- Location within Magadan Oblast Location within Russia
- Coordinates: 59°40′15″N 150°7′45″E
- Country: Russia
- Region: Magadan Oblast
- District: Olsky District
- Time zone: UTC+11:00

Arman (Russian: Армань) is a rural locality (a settlement) in Olsky District of Magadan Oblast, Russia. Population: 1,071 (2010 census); 1,521 (2002 census); 2,643 (1989 Soviet census).

== Geography ==
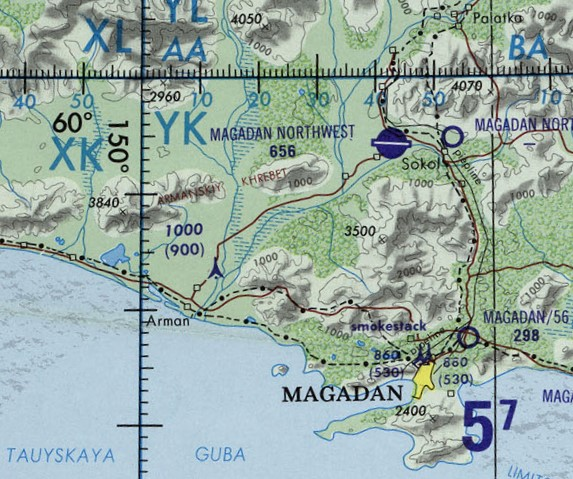
Map section of the Taui Bay

Arman is located near the Taui Bay, west of the mouth of the Arman.

== History ==
An Evenian settlement in the place of today's place was mentioned in Russian documents of the late 17th century. The name of the place and river is of Even origin and means, among other things, "spring".

During the Soviet period, a fishing, hunting and agricultural cooperative was established there, which was converted into one of the most important collective farms in the region in 1932. In 1965, Arman received urban-type settlement status, but has been a rural locality again since 2013.
