= Tenkinsky District =

Tenkinsky District Тенькинский район (Russian)
- District
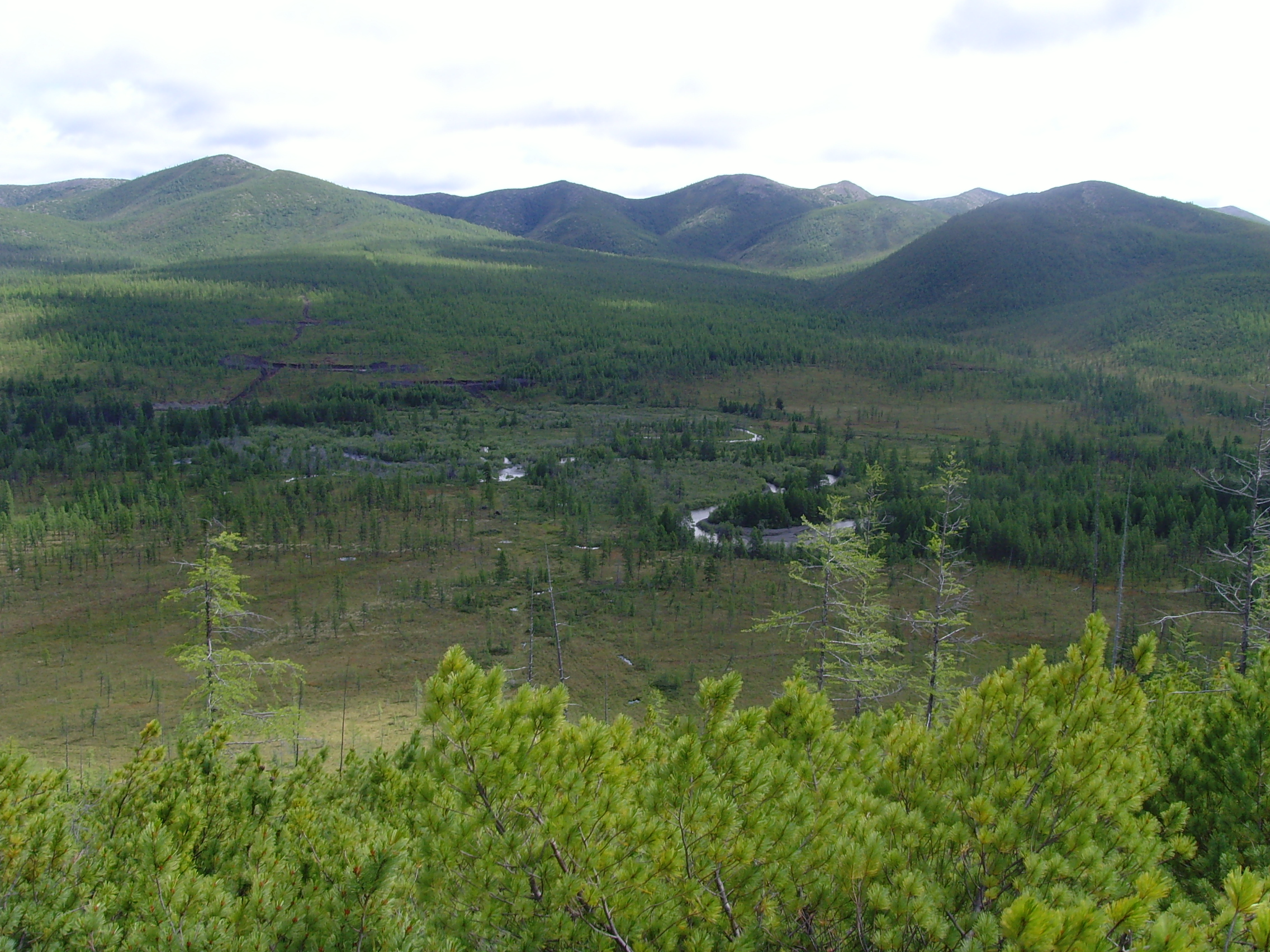
- Intrigan River valley in Tenkinsky District

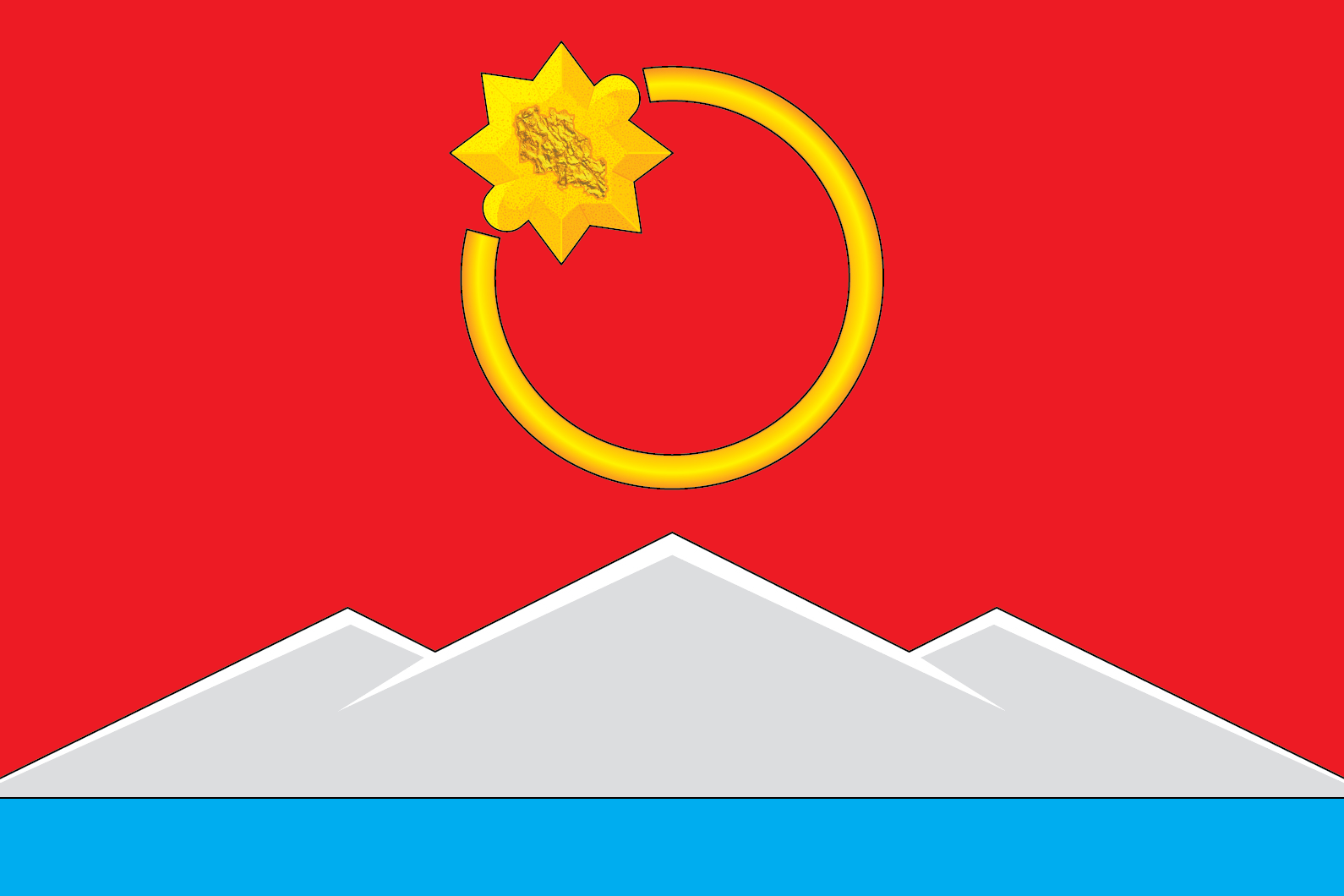
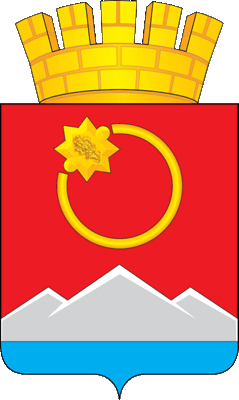
- Flag Coat of arms
- Location of Tenkinsky District in Magadan Oblast
- Coordinates: 61°04′N 149°02′E
- Country: Russia
- Federal subject: Magadan Oblast
- Established: December 2, 1953
- Administrative center: Ust-Omchug

Area
  - Total: 35,578.19 km^{2} (13,736.82 sq mi)

Population (2010 Census)
  - Total: 5,422
  - Estimate (January 2017): 4,272
  - Density: 0.1524/km^{2} (0.3947/sq mi)
  - Urban: 72.2%
  - Rural: 27.8%

Administrative structure
  - Inhabited localities: 1 urban-type settlements, 10 rural localities

Municipal structure
  - Municipally incorporated as: Tenkinsky Urban Okrug
- Time zone: UTC+11 (MSK+8)
- OKTMO ID: 44616000
- Website: http://admtenka.ru

Tenkinsky District (Russian: Теньки́нский райо́н) is an administrative district (raion), one of the eight in Magadan Oblast, Russia. As a municipal division, it is incorporated as Tenkinsky Urban Okrug. Its administrative center is the urban locality (an urban-type settlement) of Ust-Omchug. As of the 2010 Census, the total population of the district was 5,422, with the population of Ust-Omchug accounting for 72.2% of that number.

Historical population
Year	Pop.	±%
1959	24,540	—
1970	23,949	−2.4%
1979	26,690	+11.4%
1989	25,962	−2.7%
2002	8,109	−68.8%
2010	5,422	−33.1%
2021	3,216	−40.7%
Population size may be affected by changes in administrative divisions. Source: Censuses

== Geography ==
The district is named after the Tenka River and is located in the southwest of Magadan Oblast. The Arman and Bakhapcha have their sources in the district. It borders Susumansky and Yagodninsky Districts in the north, Khasynsky District in the east, Olsky District in the south, and Khabarovsk Krai in the west. The area of the district is 35,578.19 square kilometers (13,736.82 sq mi).

== History ==
The district was established on December 2, 1953.

== Administrative and municipal status ==
Within the framework of administrative divisions, Tenkinsky District is one of the eight in the oblast. The urban locality (an urban-type settlement) of Ust-Omchug serves as its administrative center.

As a municipal division, the district has been incorporated as Tenkinsky Urban Okrug since May 1, 2015. Prior to that date, the district was incorporated as Tenkinsky Municipal District, which was subdivided into one urban settlement and three rural settlements.
