= Talaya =

Talaya Талая
- Urban-type settlement
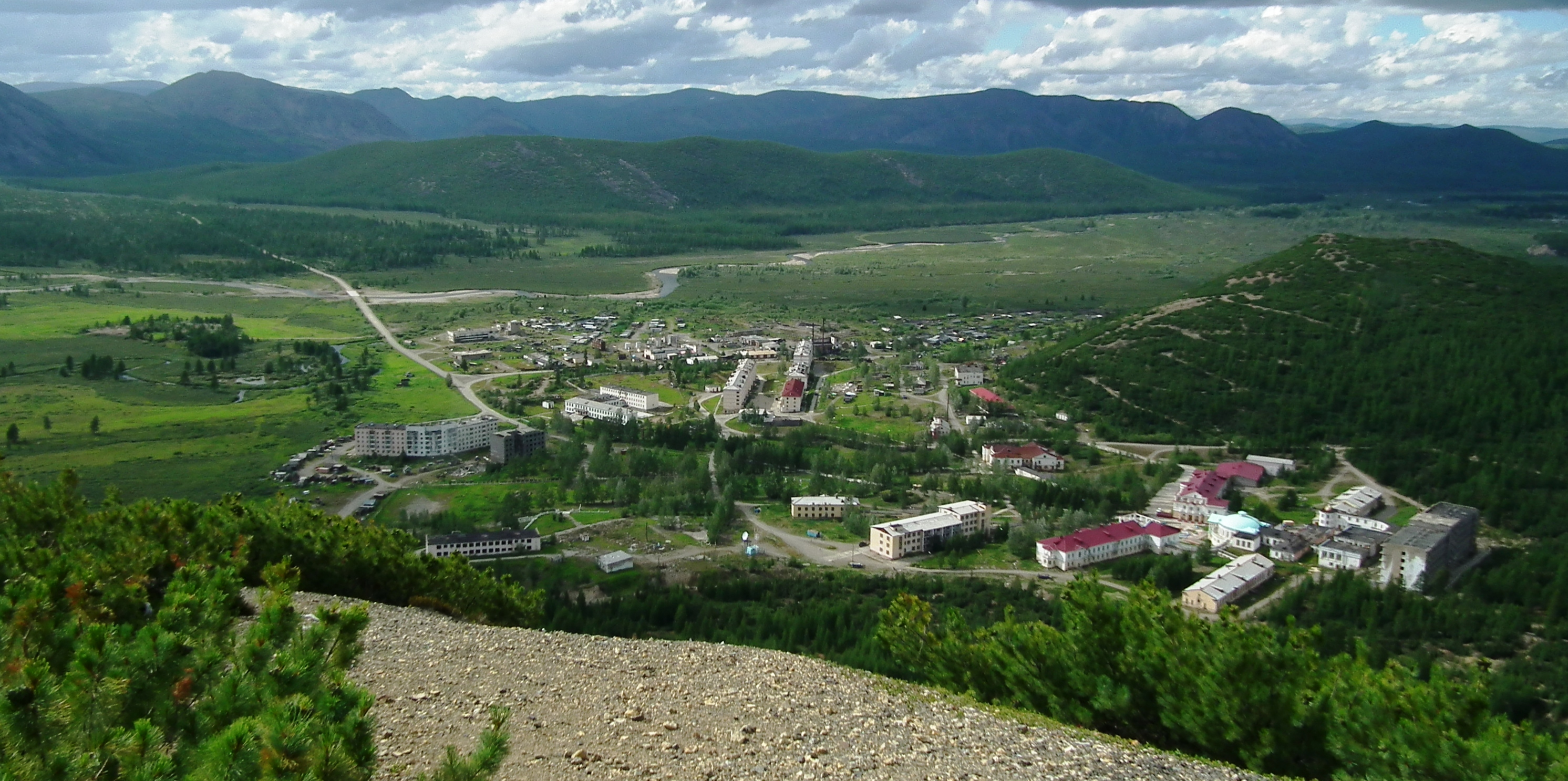
- General view of the settlement
- Interactive map of Talaya
- Location of Talaya Talaya (Magadan Oblast)
- Coordinates: 61.1338°N 152.3919°E
- Country: Russia
- Federal subject: Magadan Oblast
- Administrative district: Khasynsky District
- Founded: 1904

Population (2010 Census)
  - Total: 422
  - Estimate (2021): 364 (−13.7%)
- Time zone: UTC+11 (MSK+8)
- Postal code: 686117
- OKTMO ID: 44719000105

Talaya (Russian: Талая) is an urban locality (an urban-type settlement) in Khasynsky District of Magadan Oblast, Russia. Population: 422 (2010 census); 1,136 (2002 census); 4,412 (1989 Soviet census).

== Geography ==
The town is located on the northeastern slopes of the Maymandzhin Range, by the Talaya river, a 71 kilometres (44 mi) long tributary of the Buyunda, Kolyma basin.
