= Palatka, Magadan Oblast =

Palatka Палатка
- Urban-type settlement
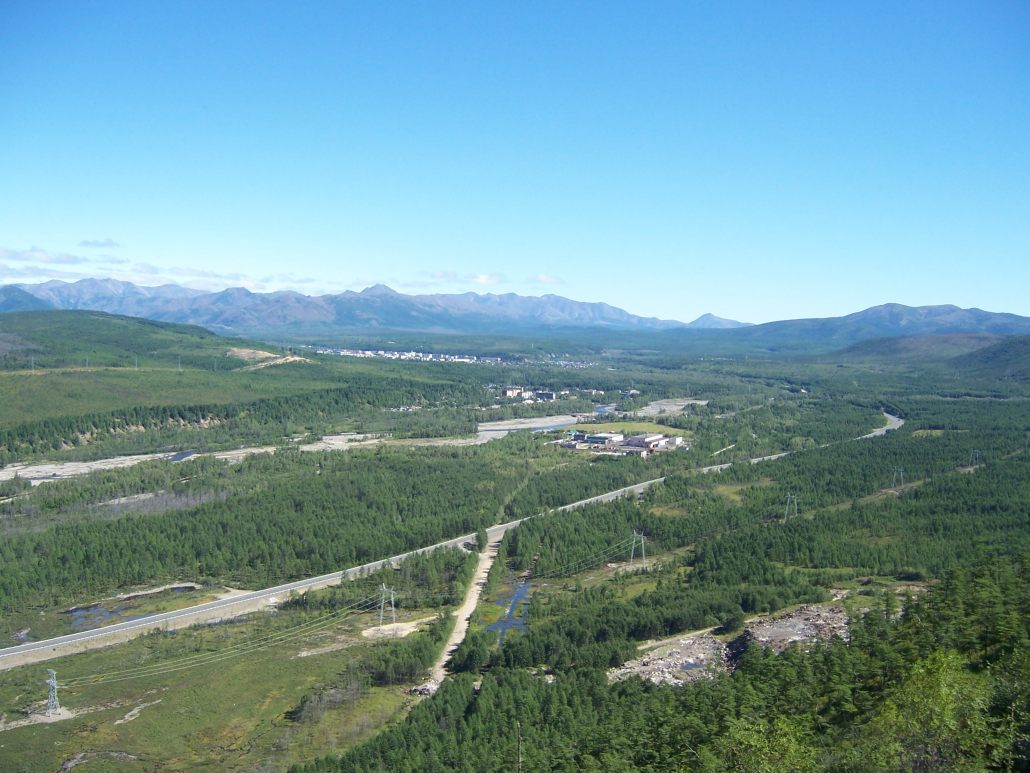
- Interactive map of Palatka
- Location of Palatka Palatka (Magadan Oblast)
- Country: Russia
- Federal subject: Magadan Oblast
- Administrative district: Khasynsky District
- Elevation: 320 m (1,050 ft)

Population (2010 Census)
  - Total: 4,244
  - Estimate (1 January 2017): 3,757 (−11.5%)
- Time zone: UTC+11 (MSK+8)
- Postal code: 686111
- OKTMO ID: 44719000051

Palatka (Russian: Палатка, lit. tent) is an urban locality (an urban-type settlement) and the administrative center of Khasynsky District of Magadan Oblast, Russia, located on the Kolyma Highway, 87 kilometers (54 mi) northwest of Magadan and about 100 kilometers (62 mi) south of Atka. Population: 4,244 (2010 census); 4,888 (2002 census); 10,496 (1989 Soviet census).

== Geography ==
The settlement is located by the bank of the Khasyn, flowing from the Kolyma Mountains.

== History ==
The exact date of foundation of the settlement is unclear, although it began at some point in the early 1930s as the area's gold reserves were explored, and a labor camp of the gulag was built here. The first official mention was in June 1932, when the first bridge was built over the Palatka River. In 1937, there were around 3,000 held at the prison settlement. The name Palatka is identical with the Russian word for 'tent', which has been suggested as the origin of the town's name as during the early period of the settlement's history it existed largely as a collection of tents and semi-permanent structures. It is also suggested that the name may come from the Evenk words Palja Atken, meaning 'stony river'.

In spite of its somewhat chaotic and unplanned nature, by 1939 Palatka was one of the largest settlements on the Kolyma Highway, and in August of that year began the construction of permanent dwellings. A narrow-gauge railway was built from Palatka to the harbor at Magadan, which remained in operation until 1950.

In the 1960s, a sovkhoz based around farming reindeer was opened in the settlement.

In the 1970s, mining activity began in nearby Karamken, and Palatka became a dormitory town for mine workers.

After the dissolution of the Soviet Union, the closure of the reindeer farm left a great number of local people unemployed (mainly Evenks and Orochs), and the mining industry also saw a general downturn with administration moving to other localities such as Susuman.

The settlement maintains sister relations with Palatka in the US state of Florida. The names are only coincidentally identical, with the name of Palatka in Florida being of Native American origin.

Palatka lies on the route of the proposed future rail link between the Amur–Yakutsk Mainline and Magadan.

== Sister city ==
- Palatka, United States
