= Ola (river) =

Ola Ола
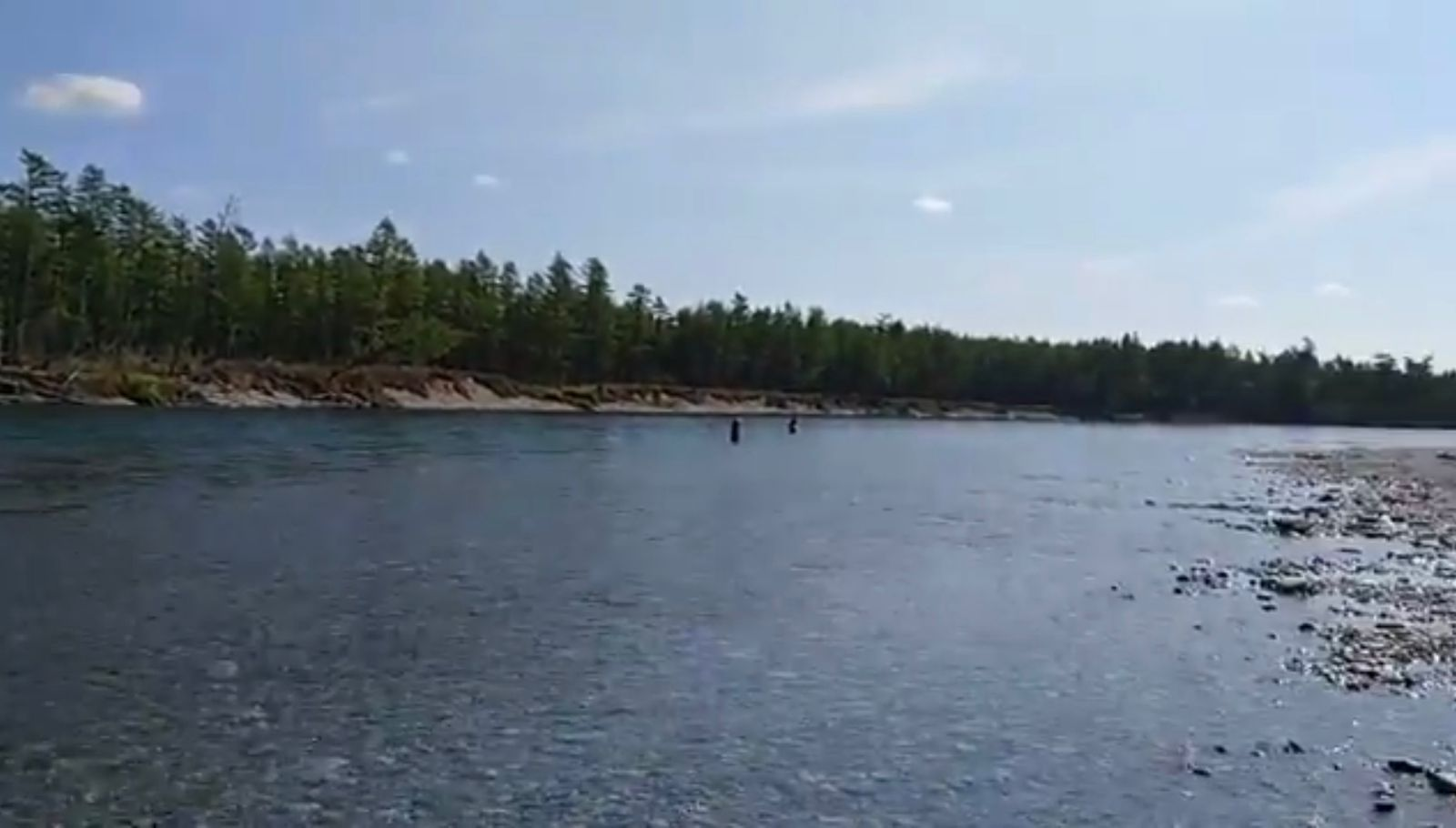

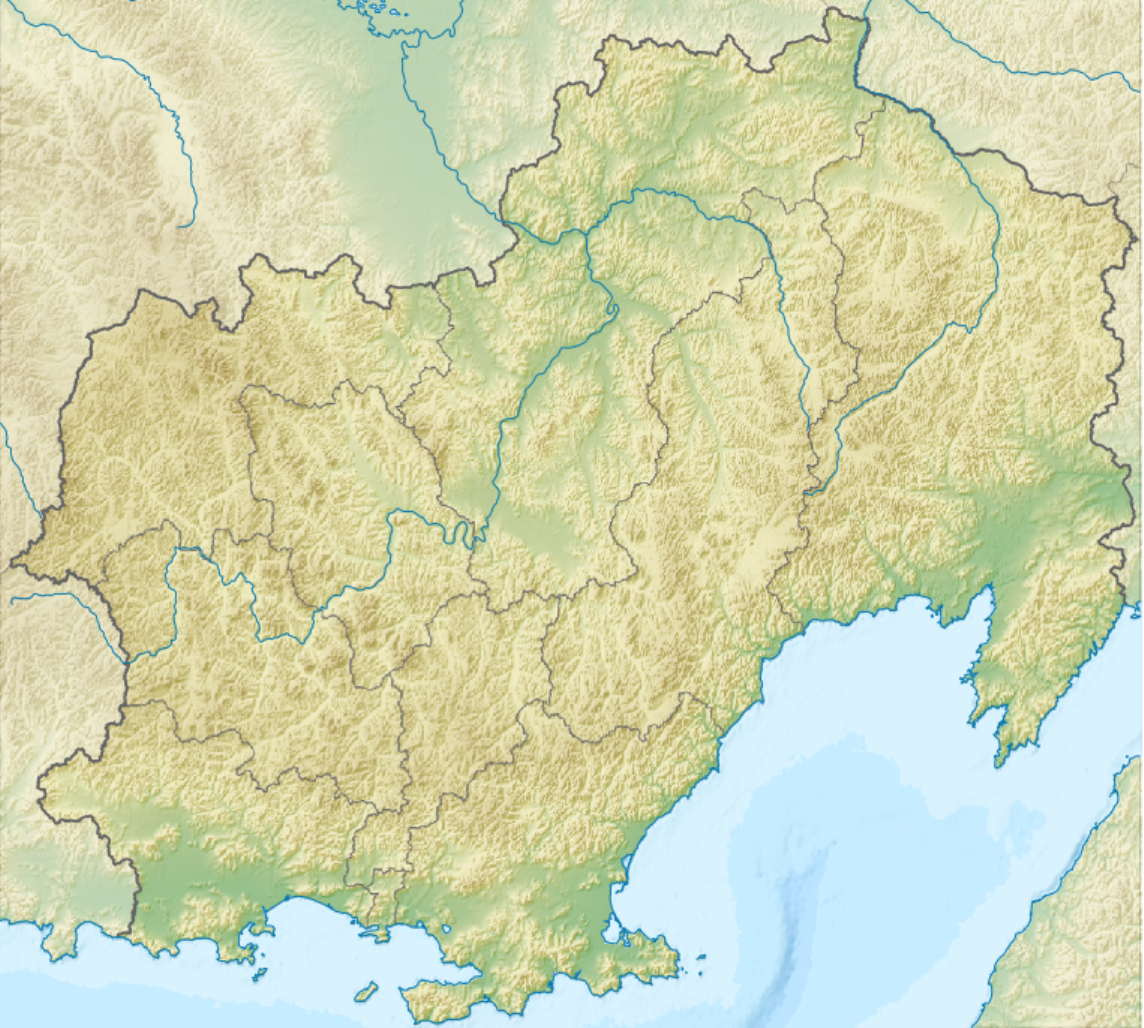
- Mouth location in Magadan Oblast, Russia

Location
- Country: Magadan Oblast, Russia

Physical characteristics
- Source
  - location: Olsky Plateau
  - coordinates: 60°40′12″N 151°17′2″E
  - elevation: 1,160 m (3,810 ft)
- Mouth: Sea of Okhotsk
  - location: Taui Bay
  - coordinates: 59°33′41″N 151°16′1″E
  - elevation: 0 m (0 ft)
- Length: 166 km (103 mi)
- Basin size: 8,570 km^{2} (3,310 sq mi)

The Ola (Russian: Ола) is a river in Magadan Oblast, Russian Far East. It is 166 kilometres (103 mi) long, with a drainage basin of 8,570 square kilometres (3,310 mi^{2}).

The R504 Kolyma Highway crosses the Ola about 40 km (25 mi) north of its mouth.

== Course ==
The river has its source in the Olsky Plateau, at the eastern end of the Upper Kolyma Highlands, 30 km (19 mi) southwest of Atka at an elevation of 1,160 metres (3,810 ft). It flows SSE for about 70 km (43 mi) then it bends and flows SSW across the Ola Lowland, bending again and flowing roughly southwards. Its last stretch is among wetlands between Magadan and Lake Chistoye. Finally it flows in the Taui Bay of the Sea of Okhotsk. Ola, the administrative center of Ola District is located at the mouth of the river.

The main tributary of the Ola is the Lankovaya that joins it in its lower course from the left.

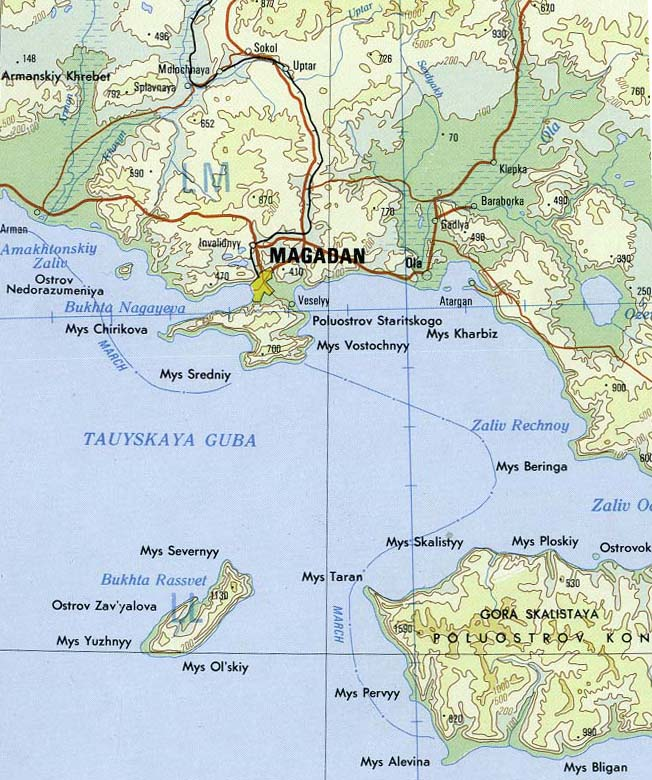
Magadan area map with the last stretch of river Ola in the upper right corner.

== See also ==
- List of rivers of Russia
