= Maymandzhin Range =

Mountain range in Russia

- Майманджинский хребет
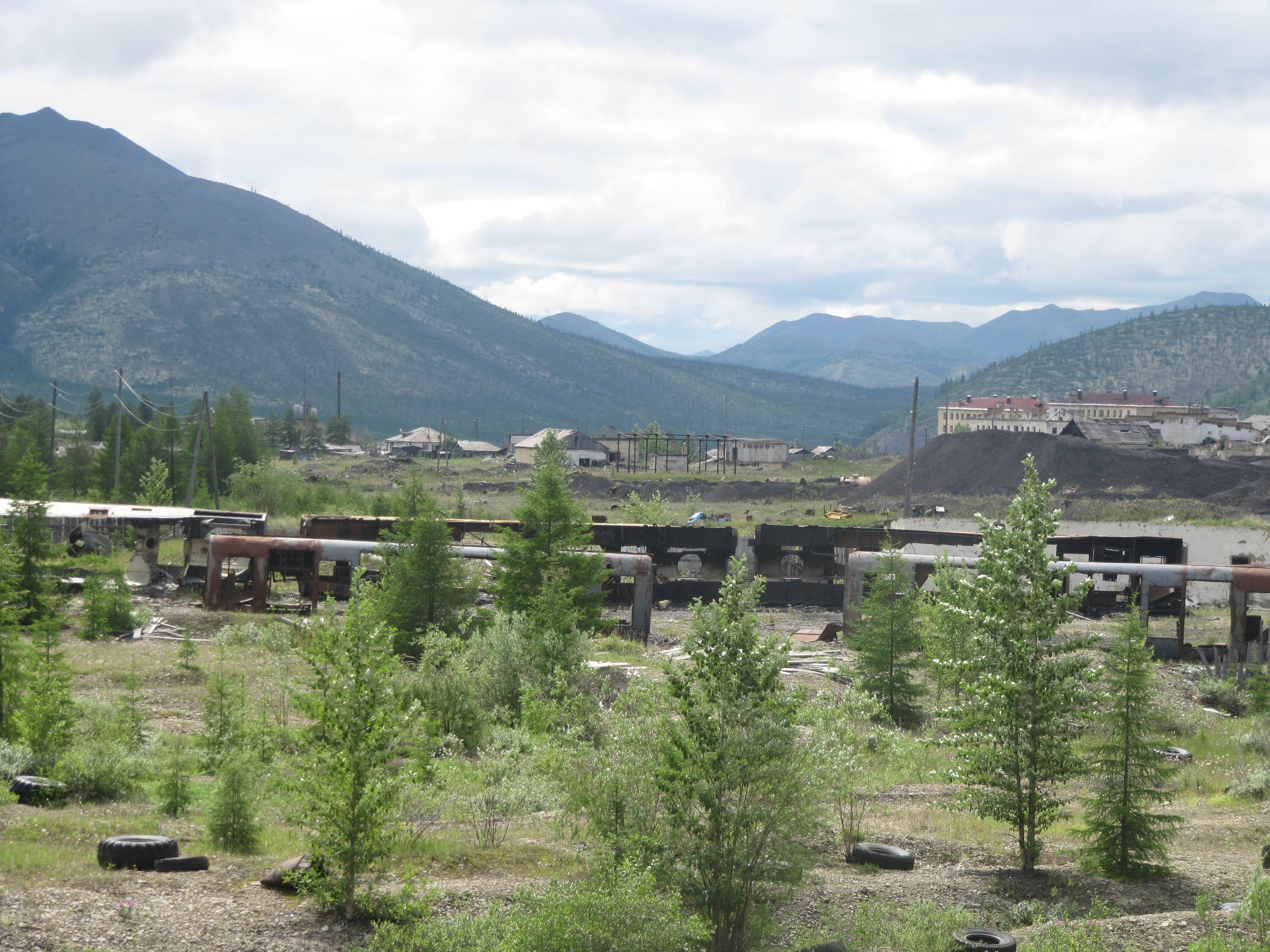
- Southern slopes of the range near Atka

Highest point
- Peak: Unnamed
- Elevation: 1,809 m (5,935 ft)

Dimensions
- Length: 200 km (120 mi) NW/SE
- Width: 40 km (25 mi) NE/SW

Geography
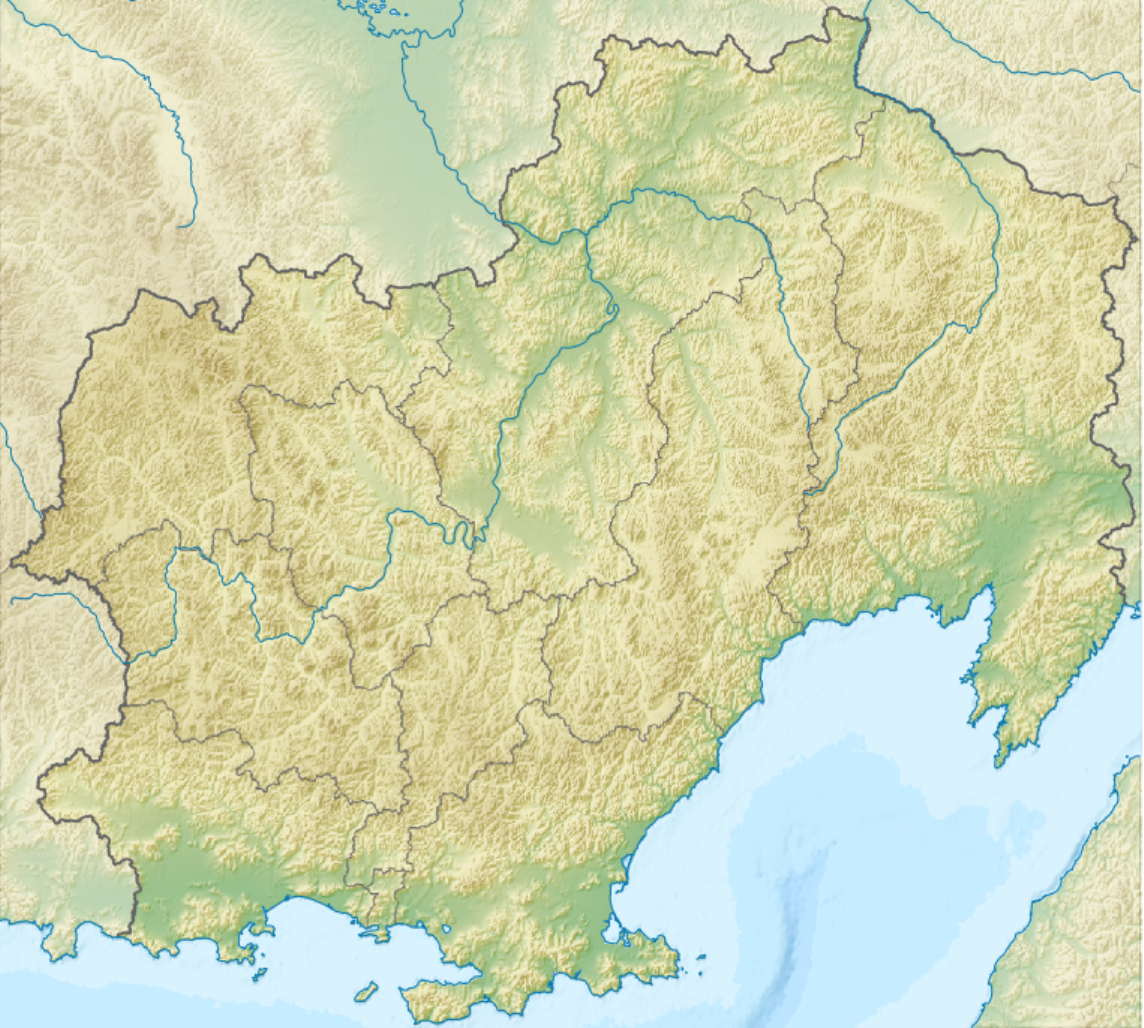
- Location within Magadan Oblast Location within Far Eastern Federal District
- Country: Russia
- Federal subject: Magadan Oblast
- District: Khasynsky District; Olsky District
- Range coordinates: 61°0′N 152°0′E
- Parent range: Kolyma Highlands, East Siberian System

Geology
- Orogeny: Alpine orogeny

Climbing
- Easiest route: From Atka or Talaya

The Maymandzhin Range (Russian: Майманджинский хребет) is a mountain range in Magadan Oblast, Far Eastern Federal District, Russia.

One of the possible routes of the projected Lena-Kamchatka railway line is across the Maymandzhin Range.

== Geography ==
The Maymandzhin Range rises at the western limit of the Kolyma Highlands system. The mountains are of moderate height, the highest summit of the range is a 1,809 metres (5,935 ft) high summit rising in the southern part. Certain sources give a height of 1,800 metres (5,900 ft).

The range is located in the interfluve of the Bakhapcha and Buyunda rivers, both right tributaries of the Kolyma flowing northwards. The Olsky Plateau lies at the southern end. 2,031 metres (6,663 ft) high Mount Khetinskaya (Гора Хетинская) rises to the northwest, beyond the northern end of the range, and to the west lie the Upper Kolyma Highlands.

=== Hydrography ===
The Yama has its sources in the southwestern slopes of the Maymandzhin Range and the Buyunda and Nyavlenga at the southern end, in the Kilgan Massif. The Talaya, a tributary of the Buyunda, and the Nerega, a tributary of the Bakhapcha, have their sources on the northeastern slopes. The Maltan, another tributary of the Bakhapcha, flows northwards, below the western slopes.

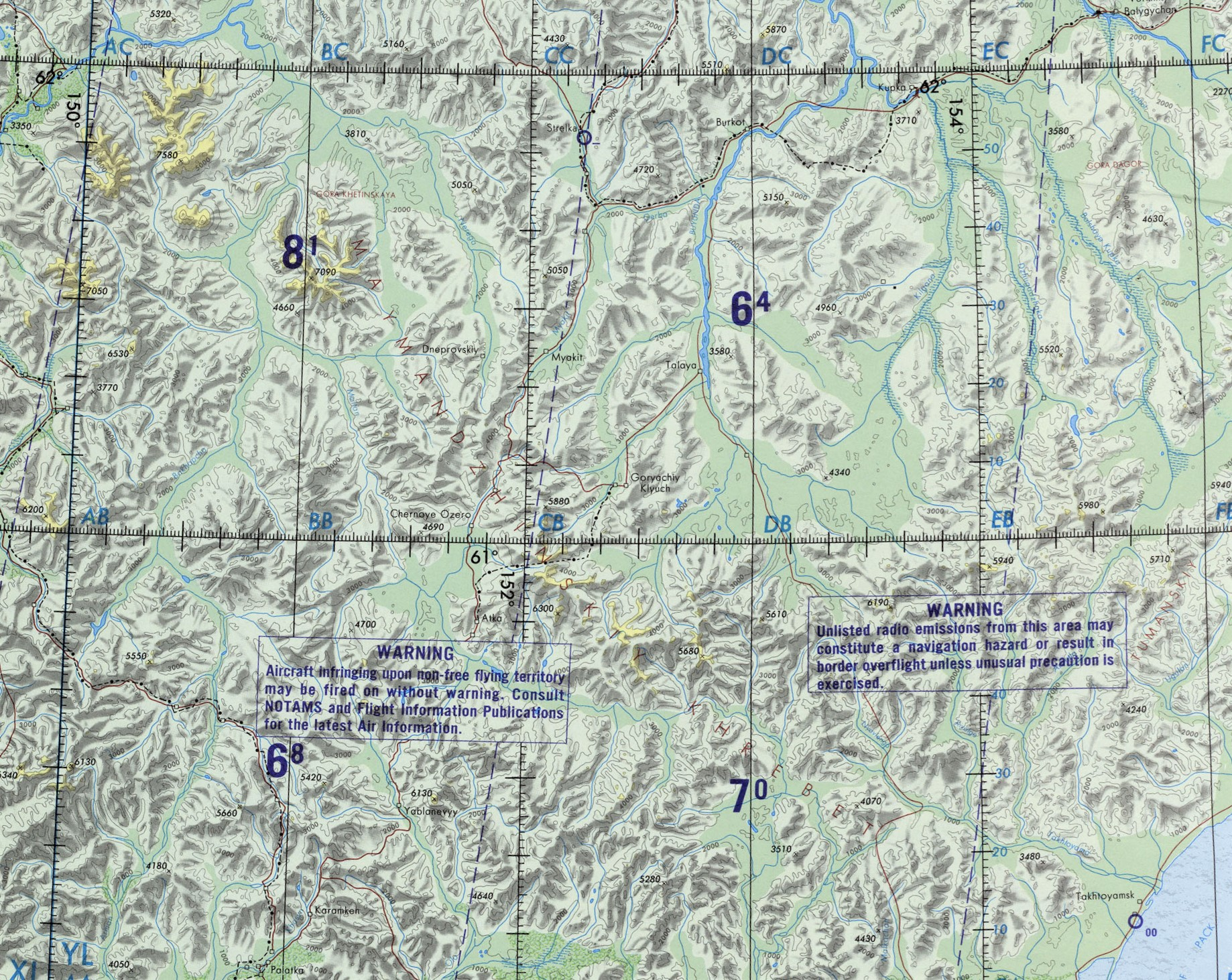
Maymandzhin Range map section.

== See also ==
- List of mountains and hills of Russia
