= Ola, Russia =

Ola О́ла
- Urban-type settlement
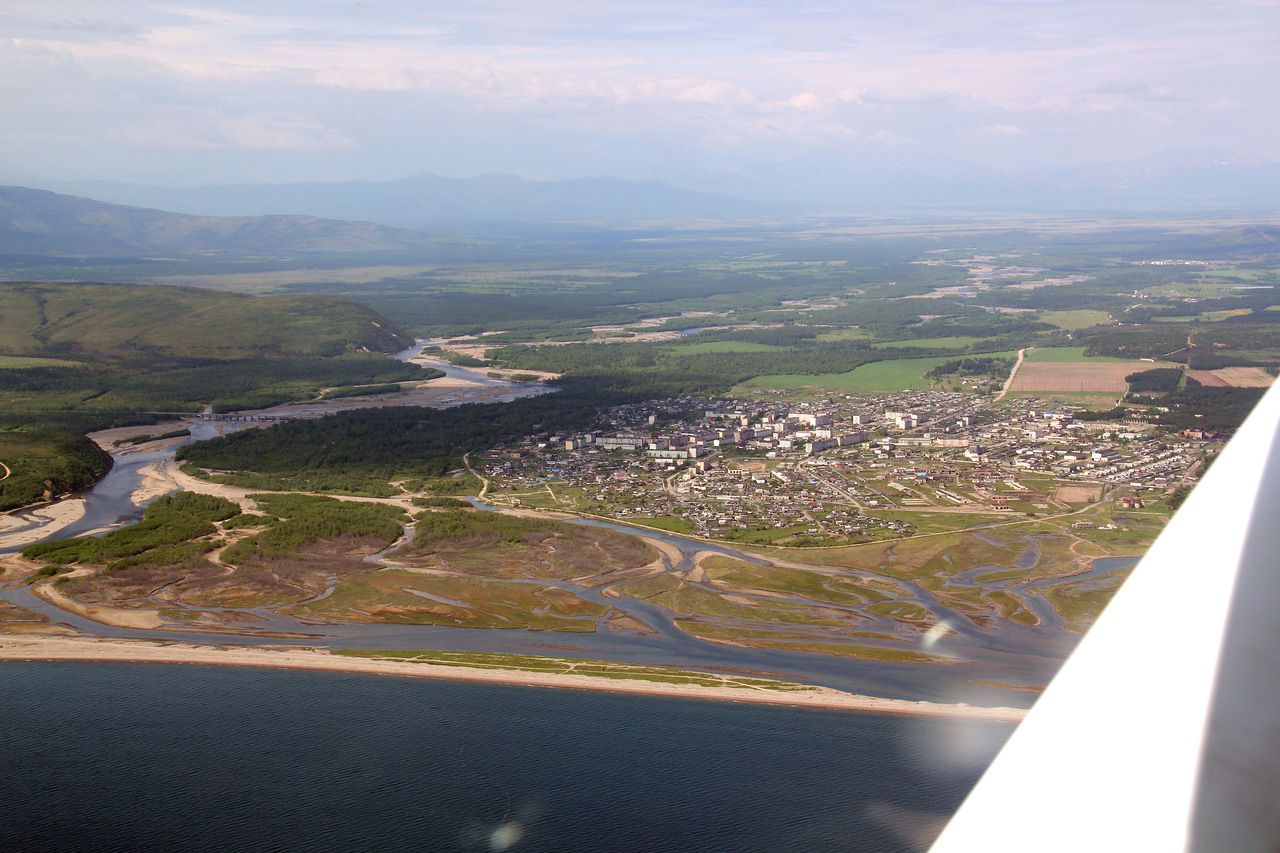

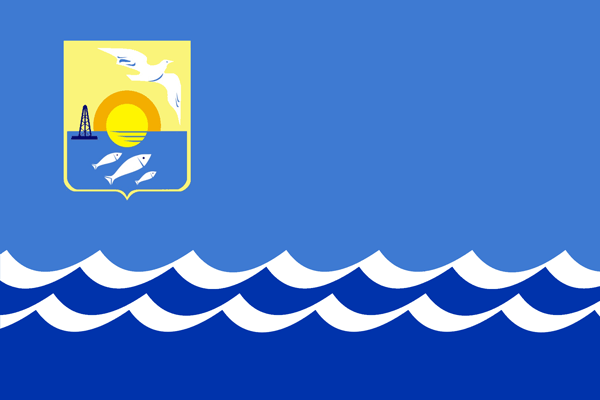
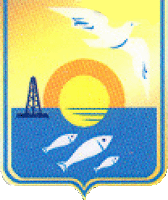
- Flag Coat of arms
- Interactive map of Ola
- Location of Ola Ola (Magadan Oblast)
- Country: Russia
- Federal subject: Magadan Oblast
- Administrative district: Olsky District

Population (2010 Census)
  - Total: 6,215
  - Estimate (1 January 2017): 6,229 (+0.2%)
- Time zone: UTC+11 (MSK+8)
- Postal code: 685910
- OKTMO ID: 44702000051

Ola (Russian: О́ла) is an urban locality (an urban-type settlement) and the administrative center of Olsky District of Magadan Oblast, Russia, located on the Ola River on the shore of the Sea of Okhotsk, 27 kilometers (17 mi) east of Magadan. Population: 6,215 (2010 census); 6,842 (2002 census); 10,122 (1989 Soviet census).
