= Bakhapcha =

Bakhapcha Бахапча
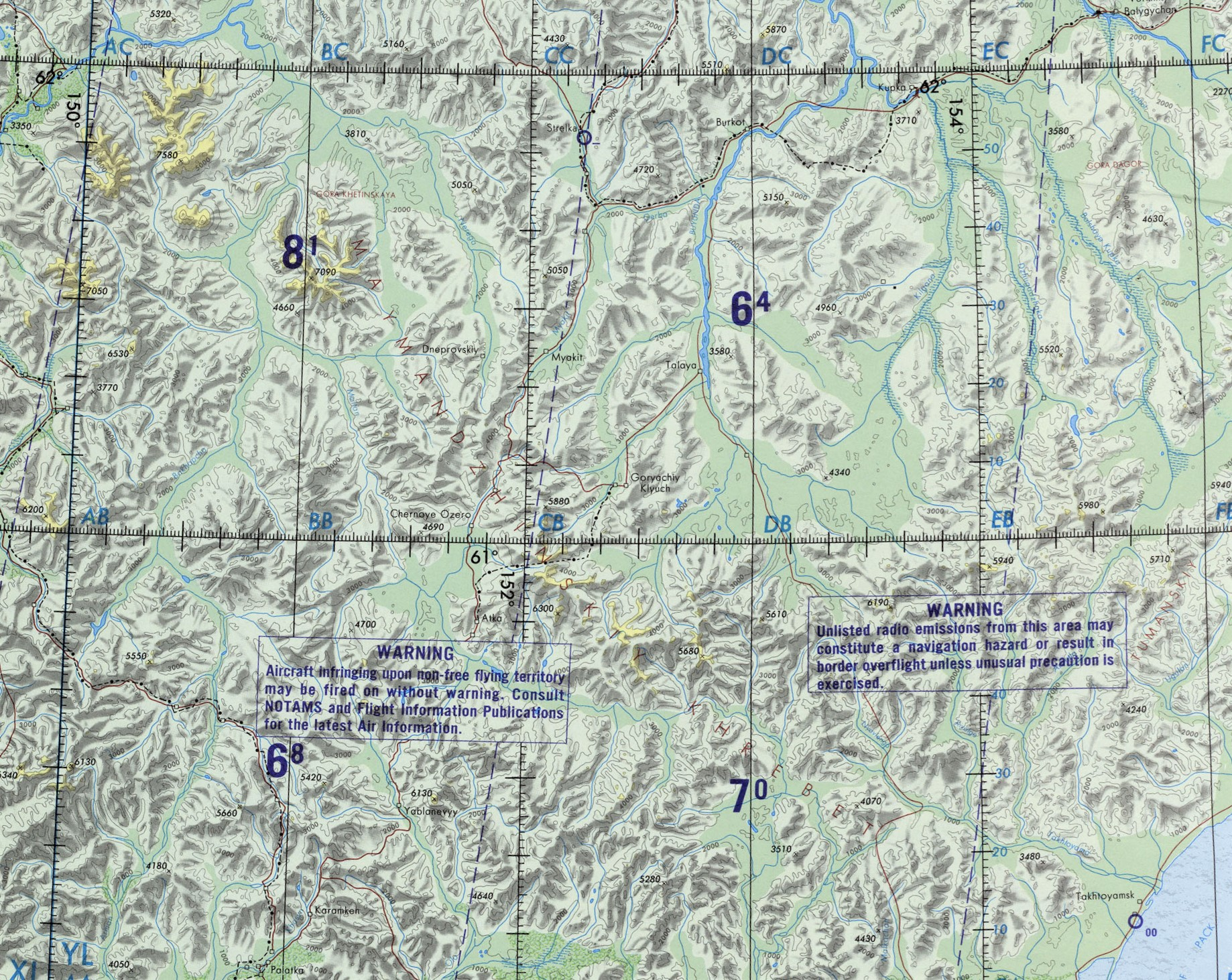

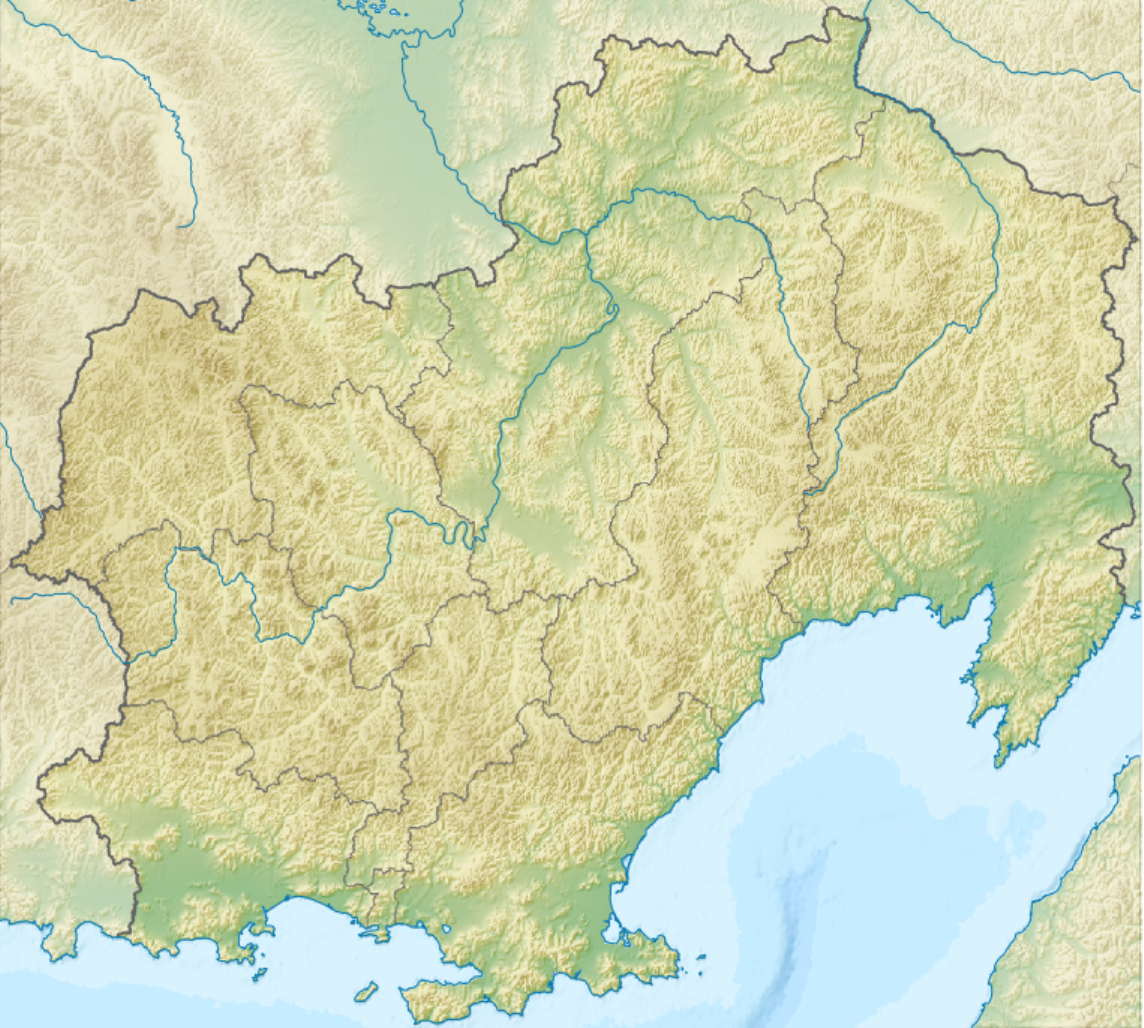
- Mouth location in Magadan Oblast, Russia

Location
- Country: Russia
- Federal subject: Magadan Oblast
- District: Yagodninsky District; Khasynsky District; Tenkinsky District

Physical characteristics
- Source
  - location: Lake Solnechnoye; Kolyma Mountains
  - coordinates: 60°55′04″N 150°30′04″E
  - elevation: 753 m (2,470 ft)
- Mouth: Kolyma
  - coordinates: 62°06′32″N 150°36′03″E
  - elevation: 330 m (1,083 ft)
- Length: 212 km (132 mi)
- Basin size: 13,800 km^{2} (5,300 sq mi)
- Discharge
  - average: 125 m^{3}/s (4,400 cu ft/s)

Basin features
- Progression: Kolyma→ East Siberian Sea

The Bakhapcha (Russian: Бахапча; also "Бохапча") is a river in Magadan Oblast, Russia. It has a length of 212 kilometres (132 mi) and a drainage basin of 13,800 square kilometres (5,300 mi^{2}).

The Bakhapcha is a right tributary of the upper course of the Kolyma. The nearest village is Sinegorye, located to the west of its mouth. The upper course of the river is a protected area.

== Course ==
The source of the Bakhapcha is in lake Solnechnoye, a small lake located west of the Olsky Plateau (Ольское плато), at the western end of the Kolyma Mountains. The Maymandzhin Range rises to the east of the river basin. The river heads across an uninhabited area roughly northwards until its mouth. Flowing across mountainous terrain there are many rapids. In the floodplain of the middle reaches the riverbed branches into sleeves with many islands in between. Further downstream the river is slightly meandering. Finally the Bakhapcha joins the right bank of the Kolyma 1,839 kilometres (1,143 mi) from its mouth, 5 km (3 mi) to the east of Sinegorye.

The river freezes yearly between late October and late May. The main tributaries of the Bakhapcha are the 157 kilometres (98 mi) long Maltan and the 121 kilometres (75 mi) long Nerega from the right.

== See also ==
- List of rivers of Russia
