= Khasyn =

Khasyn Хасын
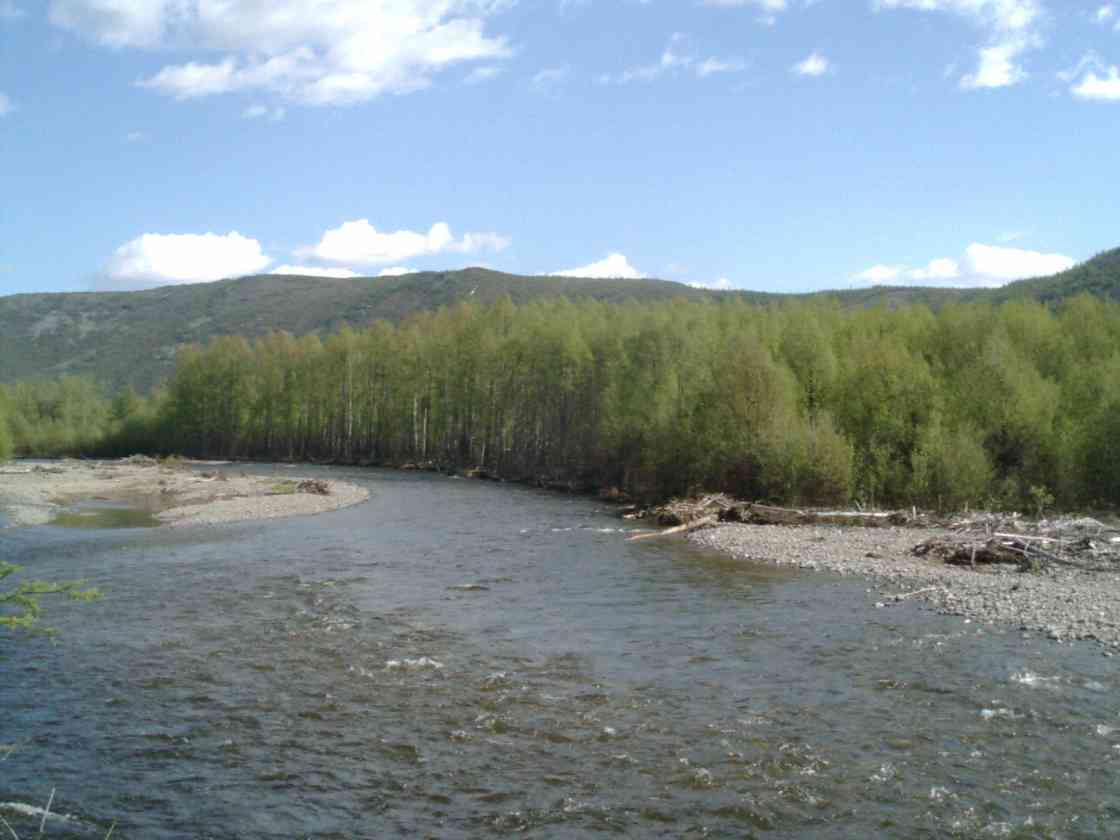
- View of the river

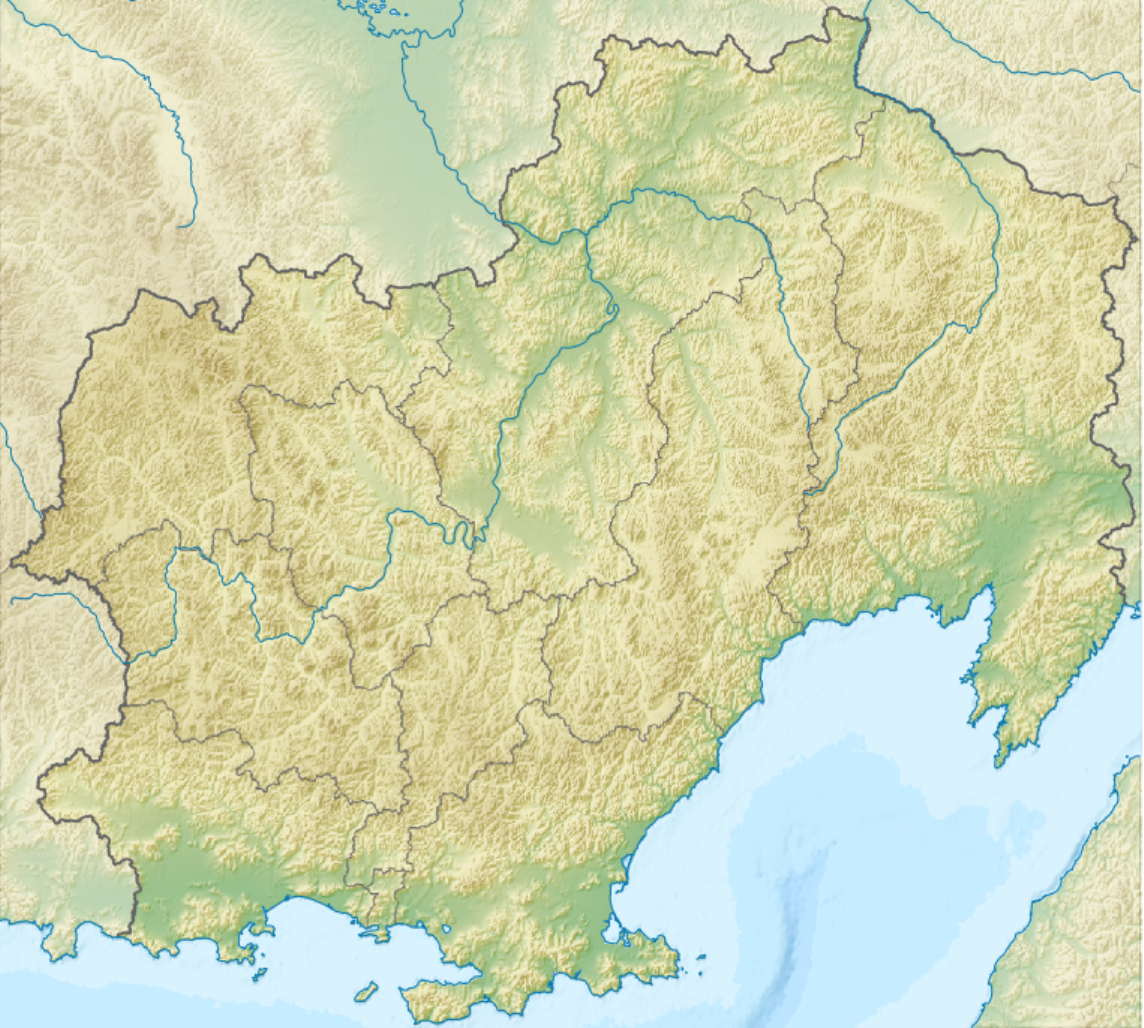
- Mouth location in Magadan Oblast, Russia

Location
- Country: Russia
- Federal subject: Magadan Oblast
- District: Khasynsky District; Olsky District

Physical characteristics
- Source
  - location: Kolyma Mountains
  - coordinates: 60°21′51″N 151°06′55″E
  - elevation: ca 800 m (2,600 ft)
- Mouth: Arman
  - coordinates: 59°41′32″N 150°12′09″E
  - elevation: 10 m (33 ft)
- Length: 115 km (71 mi)
- Basin size: 3,900 km^{2} (1,500 sq mi)
- Discharge
  - average: 8.67 m^{3}/s (306 cu ft/s)

Basin features
- Progression: Arman → Sea of Okhotsk

The Khasyn (Russian: Хасын) is a river in Magadan Oblast, Russian Far East, a tributary of the Arman. It is 115 kilometres (71 mi) long, with a drainage basin of 3,900 square kilometres (1,500 mi^{2}). The R504 Kolyma Highway runs by the riverside along a 40 km (25 mi) long stretch.

The name of the river originated in the Even language word "Khesen", meaning "herd".

== Course ==
The river has its source in the Kolyma Mountains, 15 km (9.3 mi) to the north of Karamken at an elevation of about 800 metres (2,600 ft). It flows initially southwards with many rapids across a mountainous area, bending subsequently to the SSW and holding that direction until its mouth. Finally the Khasyn joins the left bank of the Arman 12 km (7.5 mi) from its mouth in the Sea of Okhotsk.

Besides of the abandoned village of Karamken, the settlements of Palatka, Khasyn, Stekolny and Splavnaya are located by the banks of the river. Magadan's Sokol Airport is located 8 km (5.0 mi) to the east of the river.

The main tributaries of the Khasyn are the 55 km (34 mi) long Nelkandzha (Nyulkandzha) and the 42 km (26 mi) long Chalbyga from the right, as well as the 50 km (31 mi) long Uptar that joins it from the left. The Khasyn is frozen between October and May. The river is not navigable.

== Fauna ==
The river is a spawning ground for salmon, both freshwater and anadromous, such as the coho salmon. Other fish species in the river are grayling and Dolly Varden char.

== See also ==
- List of rivers of Russia
