= Karamken =

Karamken Карамкен
- Abandoned village
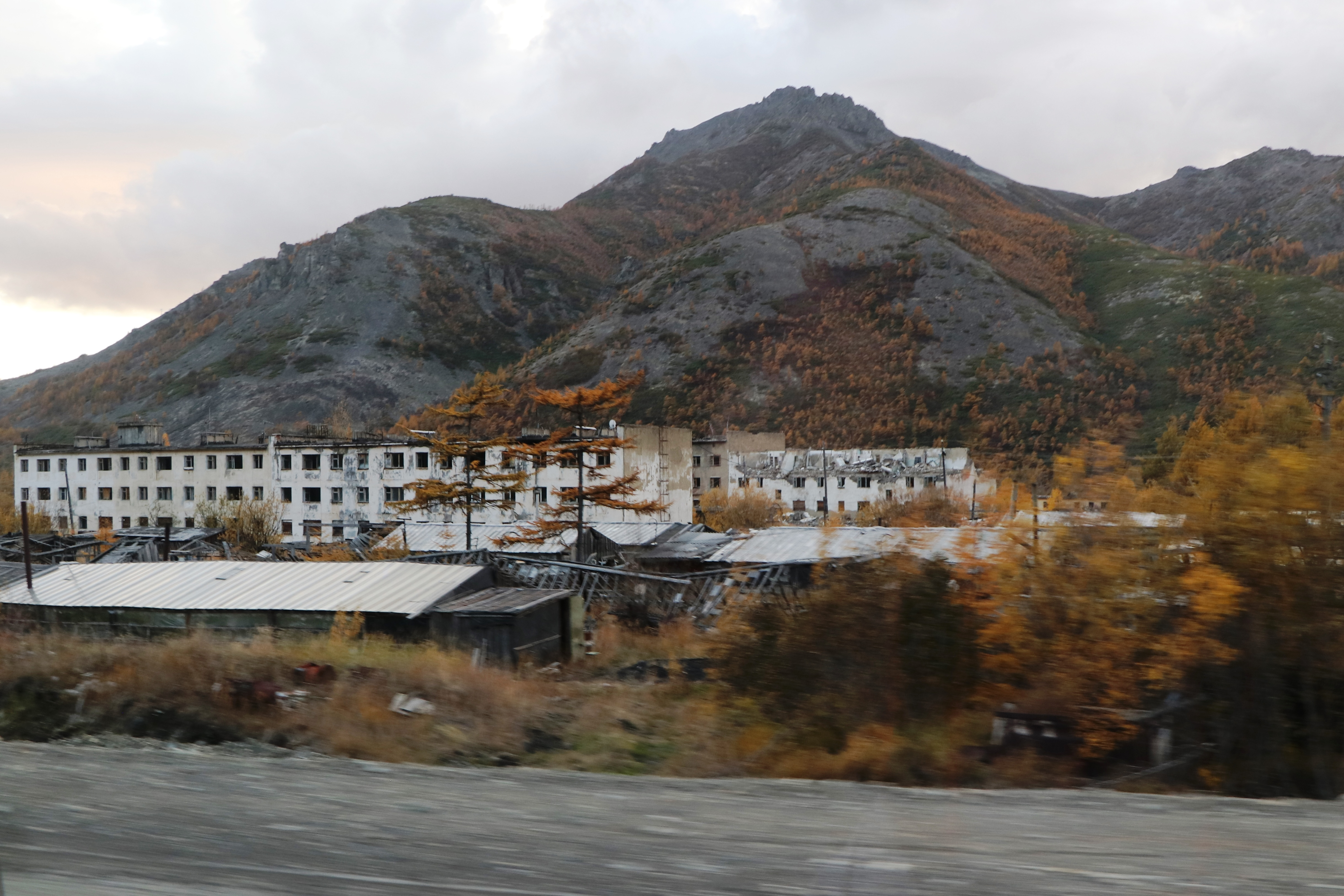
- ruins of Karamken in 2021

- Location within Magadan Oblast Location within Russia
- Coordinates: 60°12′30″N 151°5′45″E
- Country: Russia
- Federal subject: Magadan Oblast
- District: Khasynsky District

Population (2021)
  - Total: 3

Karamken (Russian: Карамкен) was a rural locality (a settlement, formerly urban-type settlement from 1974 to 2012) in the Khasynsky District of Magadan Oblast, Russia.

== Geography ==
This abandoned settlement is located by the bank of the Khasyn, flowing from the Kolyma Mountains.

== History ==
Karamken was established in the 1930s in connection with the construction of the Kolyma Highway.

After a gold and silver ore deposit was discovered nearby in 1964, the construction of an ore enrichment factory began in 1971 above the town. In 1974 Karamken received urban-type settlement status. After the ore deposits were completely exhausted, the company that was building the site was closed in 1995, after which the majority of the residents left the settlement.

Karamken had been a rural settlement again from 2012, after the number of inhabitants calculated from registration data had dropped to 60 at the beginning of 2012. The remaining residents were resettled by 31 July 2014, so the liquidation planned since 2006 was carried out.
