= Ust-Omchug =

Ust-Omchug Усть-Омчуг
- Urban-type settlement
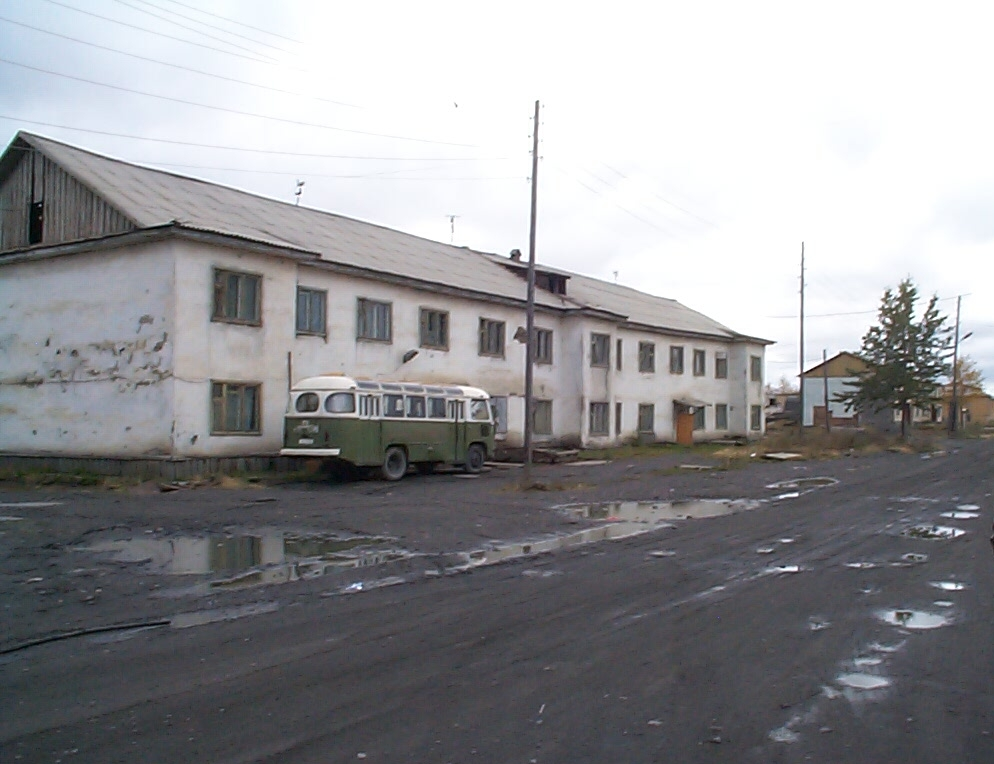
- Ust-Omchug, September 2004
- Interactive map of Ust-Omchug
- Location of Ust-Omchug Ust-Omchug (Magadan Oblast)
- Coordinates: 61°08′03″N 149°37′56″E
- Country: Russia
- Federal subject: Magadan Oblast
- Administrative district: Tenkinsky District

Population (2010 Census)
  - Total: 3,914
  - Estimate (1 January 2017): 3,273 (−16.4%)
- Time zone: UTC+11 (MSK+8)
- Postal code: 686050
- OKTMO ID: 44716000051

Ust-Omchug (Russian: Усть-Омчуг) is an urban locality (an urban-type settlement) and the administrative center of Tenkinsky District of Magadan Oblast, Russia, located at the 271-kilometer (168 mi) mark of the highway to the northwest of Magadan. Population: 3,914 (2010 census); 4,867 (2002 census); 11,343 (1989 Soviet census).

== History ==
Urban-type settlement status was granted to Ust-Omchug in 1953.

Some 56 kilometers (35 mi) north from the settlement there are couple of other abandoned settlements that once were part of the TenLag. They are Butugichag and Lower Butugichag. The settlements were part of the Soviet correctional system of GULAG.

== Economy ==
There is an ore-mining and processing plant, a mining equipment repair shop, a timber industry company, and a poultry farming sovkhoz.

== Climate ==
Ust-Omchug has a very cold subarctic climate (Köppen climate classification Dfc). Winters are prolonged and very cold, with up to eight months of sub-zero maximum daily temperatures, such that the soil remains permanently frozen. Permafrost and tundra cover most of the region. Average temperatures range from −32.6 °C (−26.7 °F) in January to +12.7 °C (54.9 °F) in July.

Climate data for Ust-Omchug
Month	Jan	Feb	Mar	Apr	May	Jun	Jul	Aug	Sep	Oct	Nov	Dec	Year
Daily mean °C (°F)	−32.6 (−26.7)	−31.2 (−24.2)	−24.2 (−11.6)	−13.4 (7.9)	−3.3 (26.1)	8.4 (47.1)	12.7 (54.9)	9.1 (48.4)	1.2 (34.2)	−12.5 (9.5)	−26.2 (−15.2)	−32.4 (−26.3)	−12.0 (10.4)
Average precipitation mm (inches)	15 (0.6)	13 (0.5)	7 (0.3)	13 (0.5)	28 (1.1)	46 (1.8)	67 (2.6)	60 (2.4)	48 (1.9)	38 (1.5)	24 (0.9)	16 (0.6)	375 (14.7)
Average relative humidity (%)	69.4	69.6	74.5	80.7	82.4	69.9	68.0	74.7	80.8	80.2	74.4	69.6	74.5
Source 1: NASA RETScreen Database
Source 2: Climate-data.org

== Gallery ==
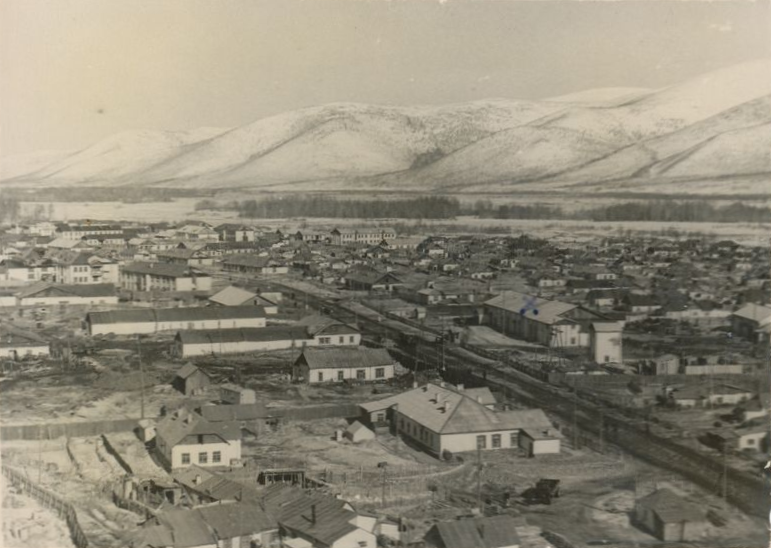
Aerial view in 1958

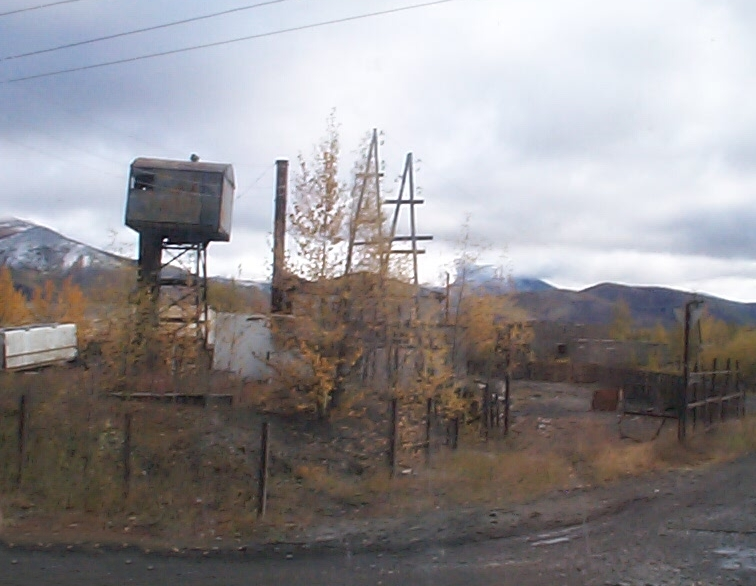
Ruined structures

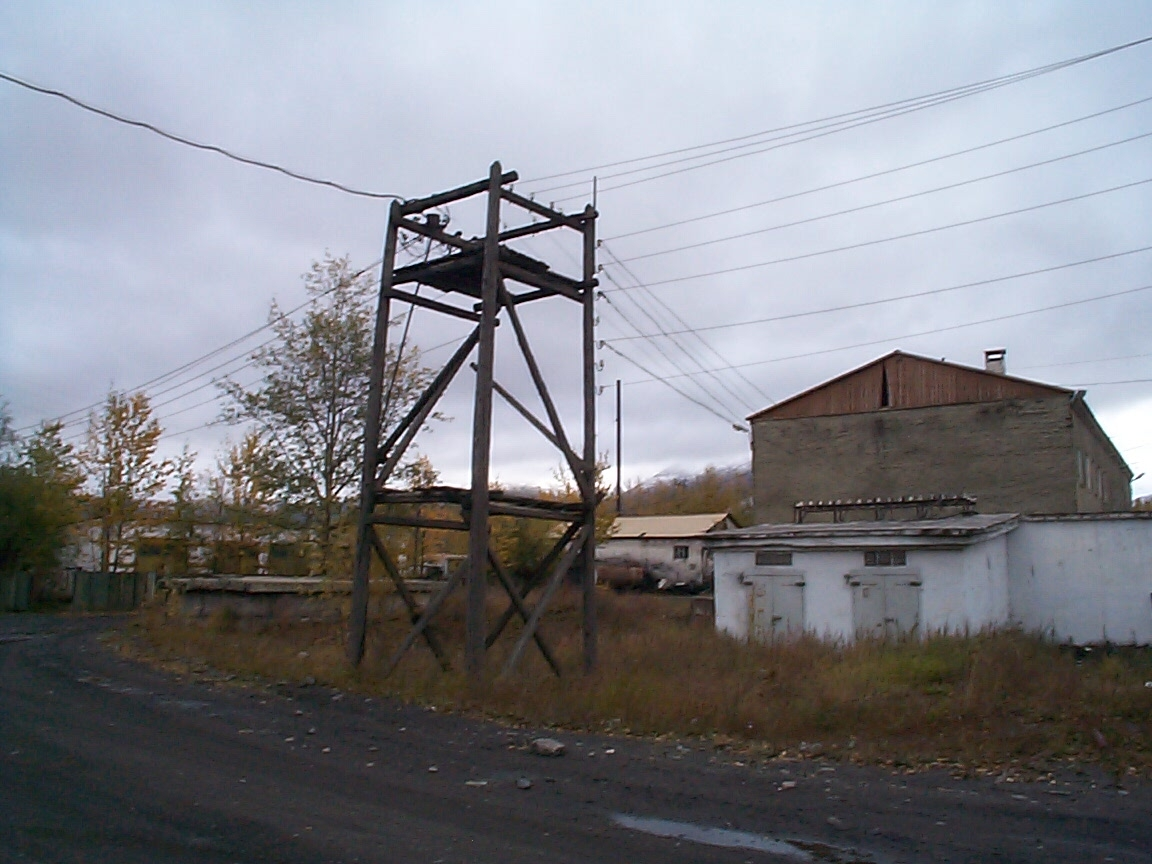
Electricity substation

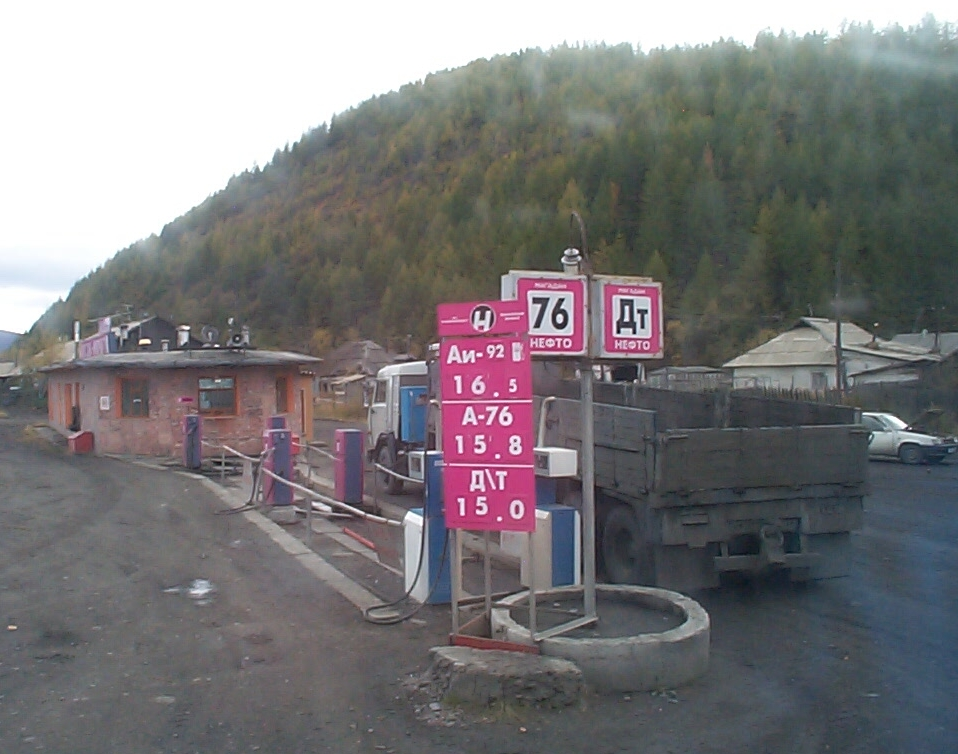
Gas station
