= Maltan =

Maltan Малтан
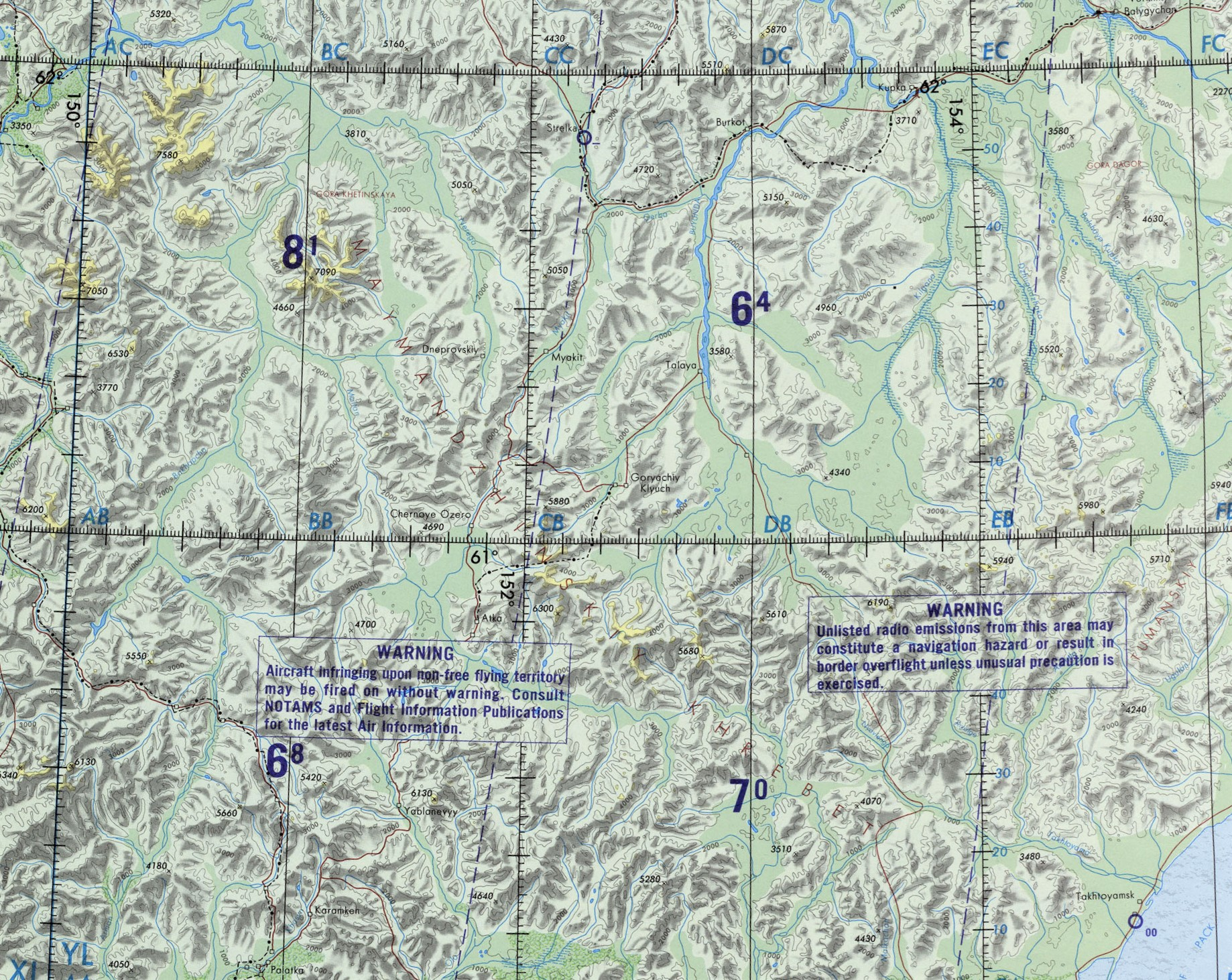

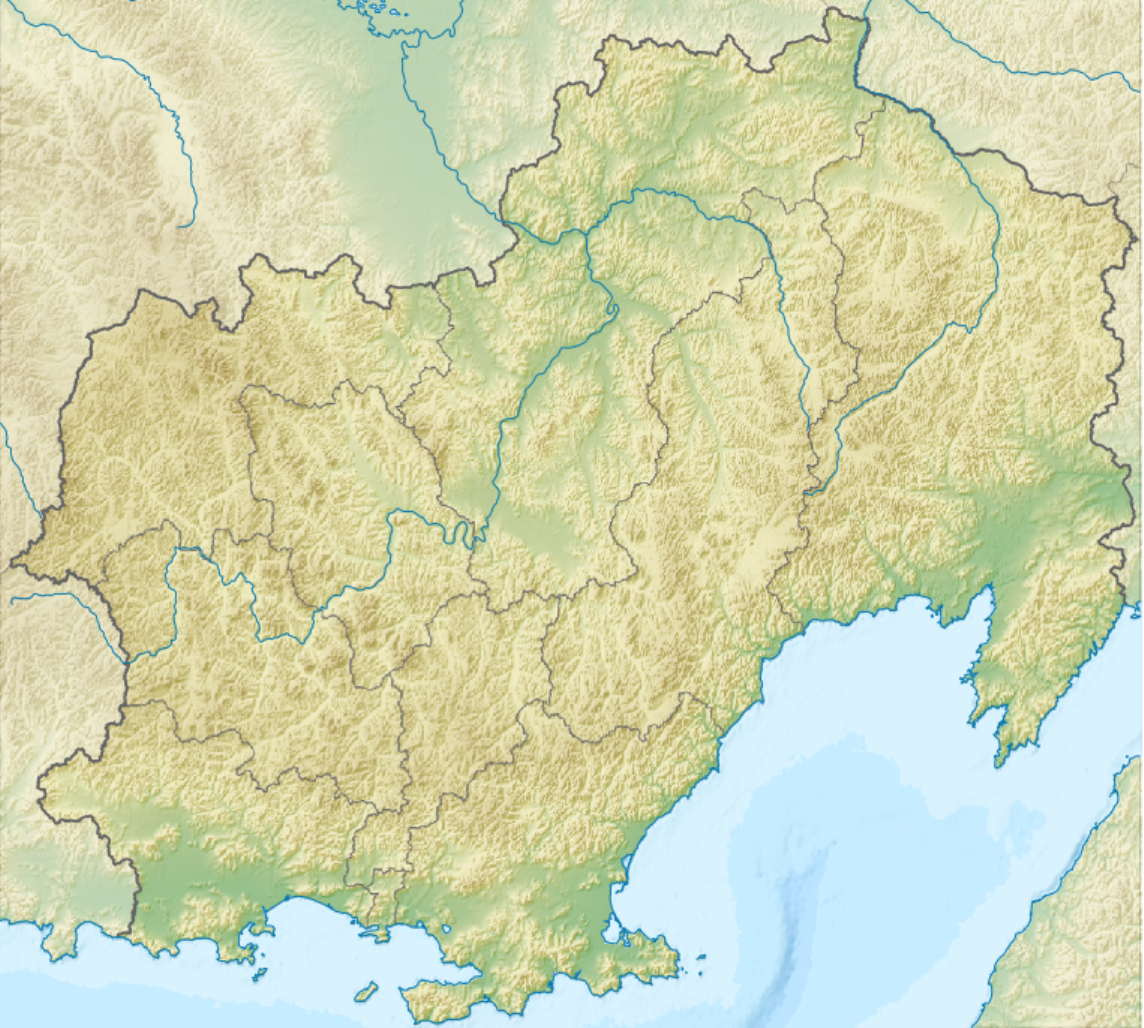
- Mouth location in Magadan Oblast, Russia

Location
- Country: Russia
- Federal subject: Magadan Oblast
- District: Khasynsky District

Physical characteristics
- Source
  - location: Mount Nukh; Kolyma Mountains
  - coordinates: 60°38′01″N 151°33′43″E
- Mouth: Bakhapcha
  - coordinates: 61°26′38″N 150°48′59″E
- Length: 157 km (98 mi)
- Basin size: 4,900 km^{2} (1,900 sq mi)

Basin features
- Progression: Bakhapcha → Kolyma→ East Siberian Sea

The Maltan (Russian: Малтан) is a river in Magadan Oblast, Russia. It has a length of 157 kilometres (98 mi) and a drainage basin of 4,900 square kilometres (1,900 mi^{2}). The Maltan is the longest tributary of the Bakhapcha, of the Kolyma basin.

The river flows across an uninhabited area, the nearest village is Sinegorye, located to the north. The name of the river originated in an Even word for "bend" or "curvature".

== Course ==
The source of the Maltan is in the northern slopes of Mount Nukh (Гора Нух) of the Olsky Plateau area, at the western end of the Kolyma Mountains, close to the R504 Kolyma Highway. It flows near Atka in its upper course, not far from the sources of the Yama. The river heads in a NNW direction along the western slopes of the Maymandzhin Range. Finally it turns to the WNW below the southern slopes of Mount Khetinskaya (Гора Хетинская) and joins the right bank of the Bakhapcha 122 kilometres (76 mi) from its mouth in the Kolyma.

The river freezes yearly between late October and late May.

=== Tributaries ===
The main tributaries of the Maltan are the 31 kilometres (19 mi) long Veyer (Snorovka), the 56 kilometres (35 mi) long Nosegchen (Nasakchan or Nyazakhchan) and the 50 kilometres (31 mi) long Khurendzha (Khirunda) from the left and the 45 kilometres (28 mi) long Asan, the 61 kilometres (38 mi) long Kheta and the 45 kilometres (28 mi) long Basandra from the right.

== See also ==
- List of rivers of Russia
