= Olsky District =

Olsky District Ольский район (Russian)
- District
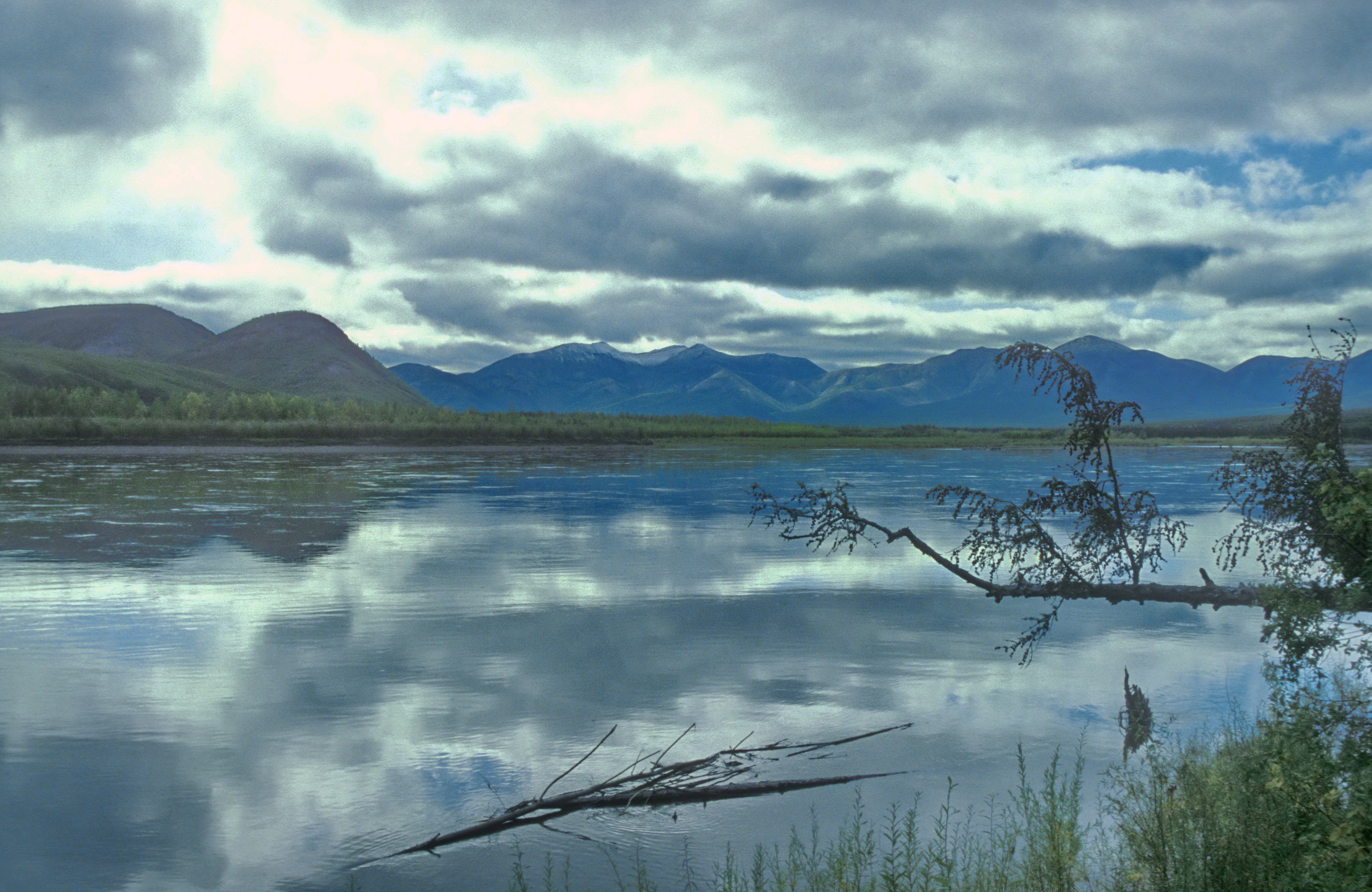
- Kolyma River in Magadan Nature Reserve, Olsky District

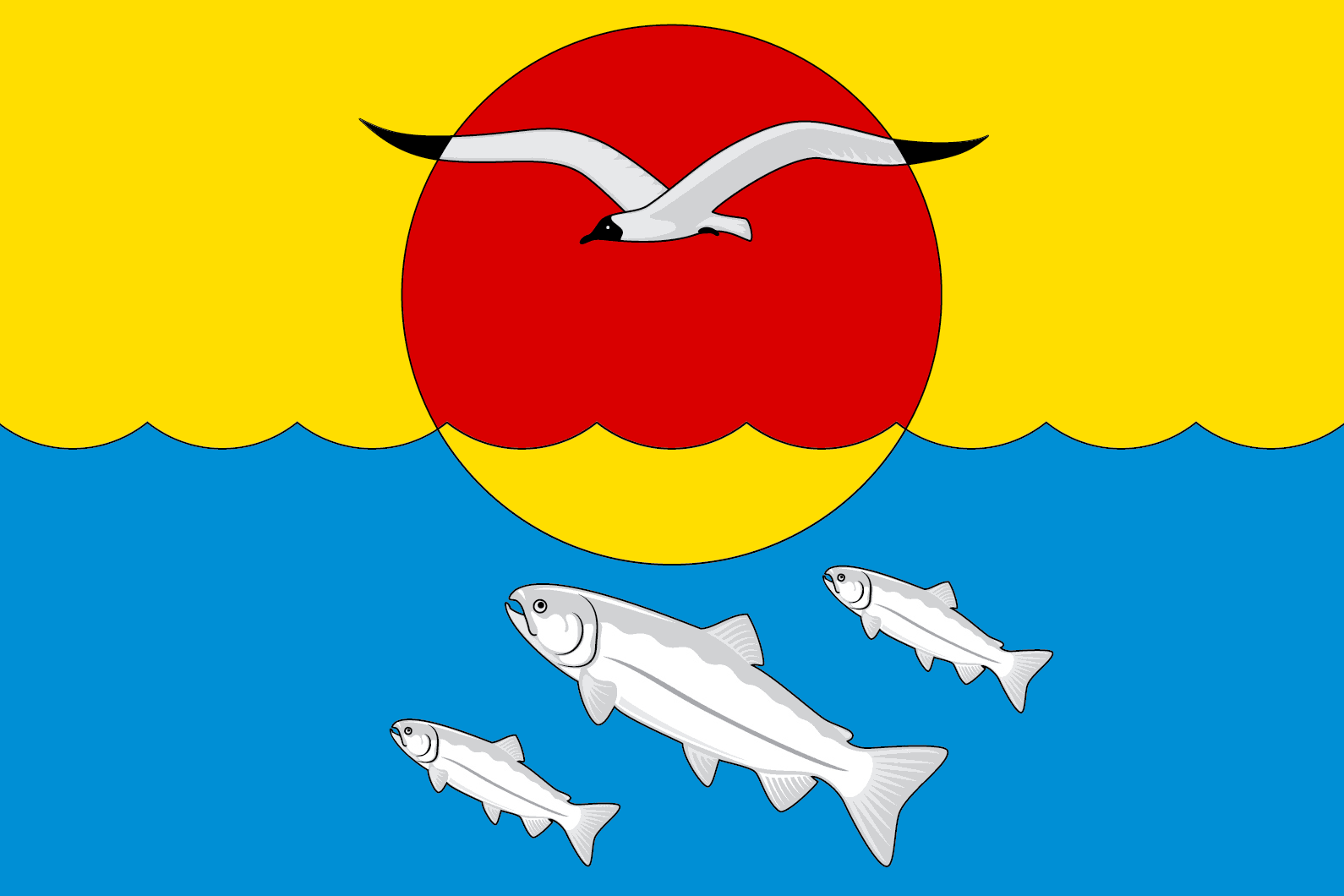
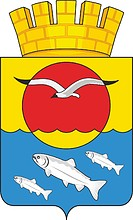
- Flag Coat of arms
- Location of Olsky District in Magadan Oblast
- Coordinates: 59°34′N 151°8′E
- Country: Russia
- Federal subject: Magadan Oblast
- Established: 4 January 1926
- Administrative center: Ola

Area
  - Total: 75,900 km^{2} (29,300 sq mi)

Population (2010 Census)
  - Total: 10,496
  - Estimate (1 January 2017): 9,948
  - Density: 0.138/km^{2} (0.358/sq mi)
  - Urban: 69.4%
  - Rural: 30.6%

Administrative structure
  - Inhabited localities: 1 urban-type settlements, 11 rural localities

Municipal structure
  - Municipally incorporated as: Olsky Municipal District
  - Municipal divisions: 1 urban settlements, 8 rural settlements
- Time zone: UTC+11 (MSK+8)
- OKTMO ID: 44702000
- Website: http://www.olskiyraion.ru

Population of Olsky District
- 2010 Census: 10,496
- 2002 Census: 12,458
- 1989 Census: 22,454
- 1979 Census: 18,804

Olsky District (Russian: О́льский райо́н) is an administrative and municipal district (raion), one of the eight in Magadan Oblast, Russia. It is located in the south of the oblast, consists of two unconnected mainland parts separated by the territories of Khasynsky District and the town of oblast significance of Magadan, and also has jurisdiction over several islands. The area of the district is 75,900 square kilometers (29,300 sq mi). Its administrative center is the urban locality (an urban-type settlement) of Ola. As of the 2010 Census, the total population of the district was 10,496, with the population of Ola accounting for 59.2% of that number.

== Geography ==
The Ola, the Arman (with the Khasyn) and the Yama cross the district from north to south and the Buyunda has its sources in the district. The Olsky Plateau and the Maymandzhin Range are located in the district.
