= Arman (river) =

Arman Армань
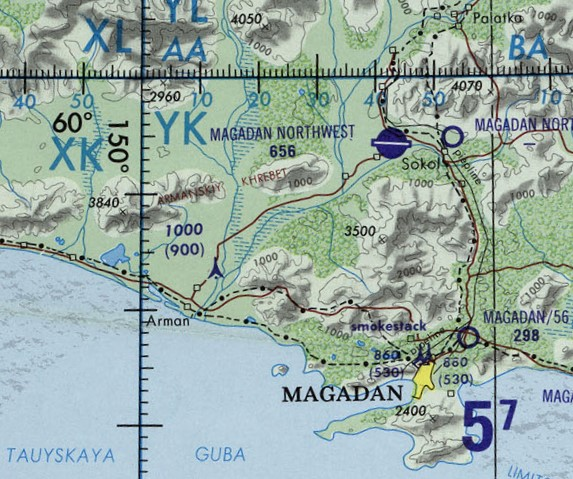
- Lower course of the Arman, Magadan Oblast

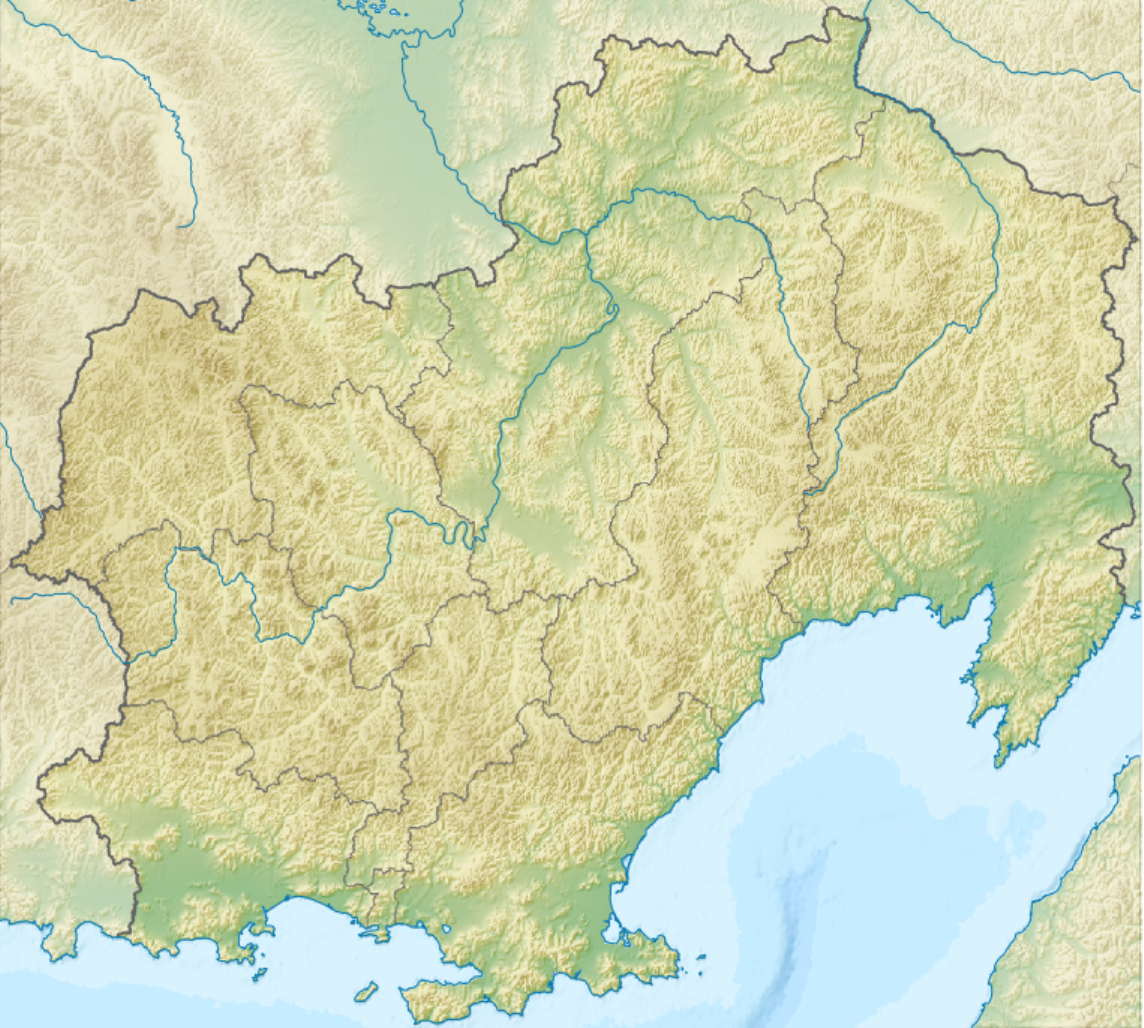
- Mouth location in Magadan Oblast, Russia

Location
- Country: Magadan Oblast, Russia

Physical characteristics
- Source
  - location: Kolyma Mountains
  - coordinates: 60°49′1″N 151°8′20″E
  - elevation: ca 700 m (2,300 ft)
- Mouth: Sea of Okhotsk
  - location: Near Arman, Taui Bay; Sea of Okhotsk
  - coordinates: 59°39′58″N 150°6′50″E
  - elevation: 0 m (0 ft)
- Length: 197 km (122 mi)
- Basin size: 7,770 km^{2} (3,000 sq mi)

The Arman (Russian: Армань; Even: Анманра) is a river in Magadan Oblast, Russian Far East. It is 197 kilometres (122 mi) long, with a drainage basin of 7,770 square kilometres (3,000 mi^{2}).

The name of the Arman originated in the Even language, meaning "spring" or "mashed ice". In the upper course there are stretches where the river is known as Artelnyi (Agchakh) and Akhchan.

== Course ==
The river has its source in the Olsky Plateau of the Upper Kolyma Highlands, 35 km (22 mi) to the west of Atka at an elevation of about 700 metres (2,300 ft). It flows roughly southwards across a mountainous area. In its last stretch is descends to a floodplain with wetlands to the west of Magadan, where it flows across the Arman Range. Further downstream it is joined by the Khasyn from the left. The river ends in a wide lagoon separated from the sea by a landspit. The waters of the Arman enter Taui Bay of the Sea of Okhotsk through a narrow channel at the western end of the spit. Arman village is located on the western side of the mouth of the river.

The main tributary of the Arman is the 115 km (71 mi) long Khasyn that joins it in its lower course from the left. Other tributaries are relatively small. The river is frozen between October and May.

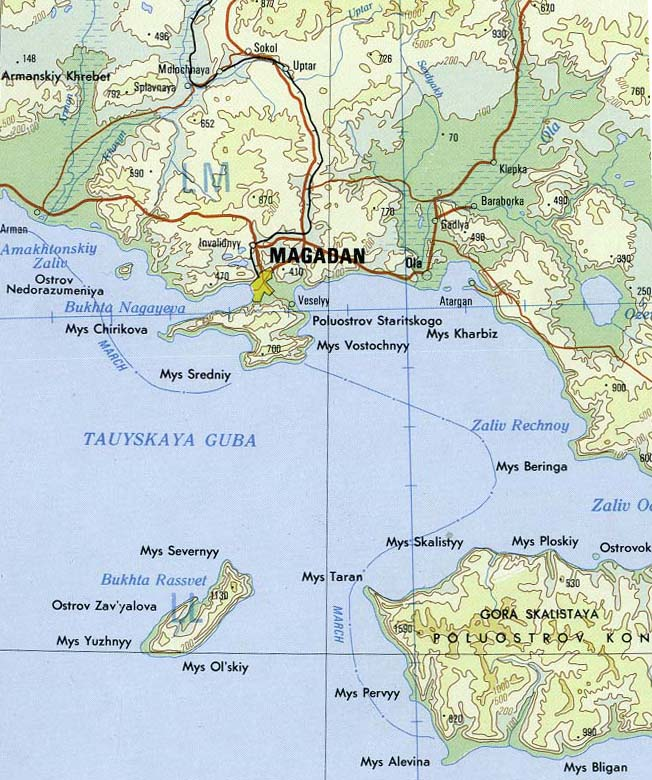
Magadan area map with the last stretch of the Arman in the upper left corner.

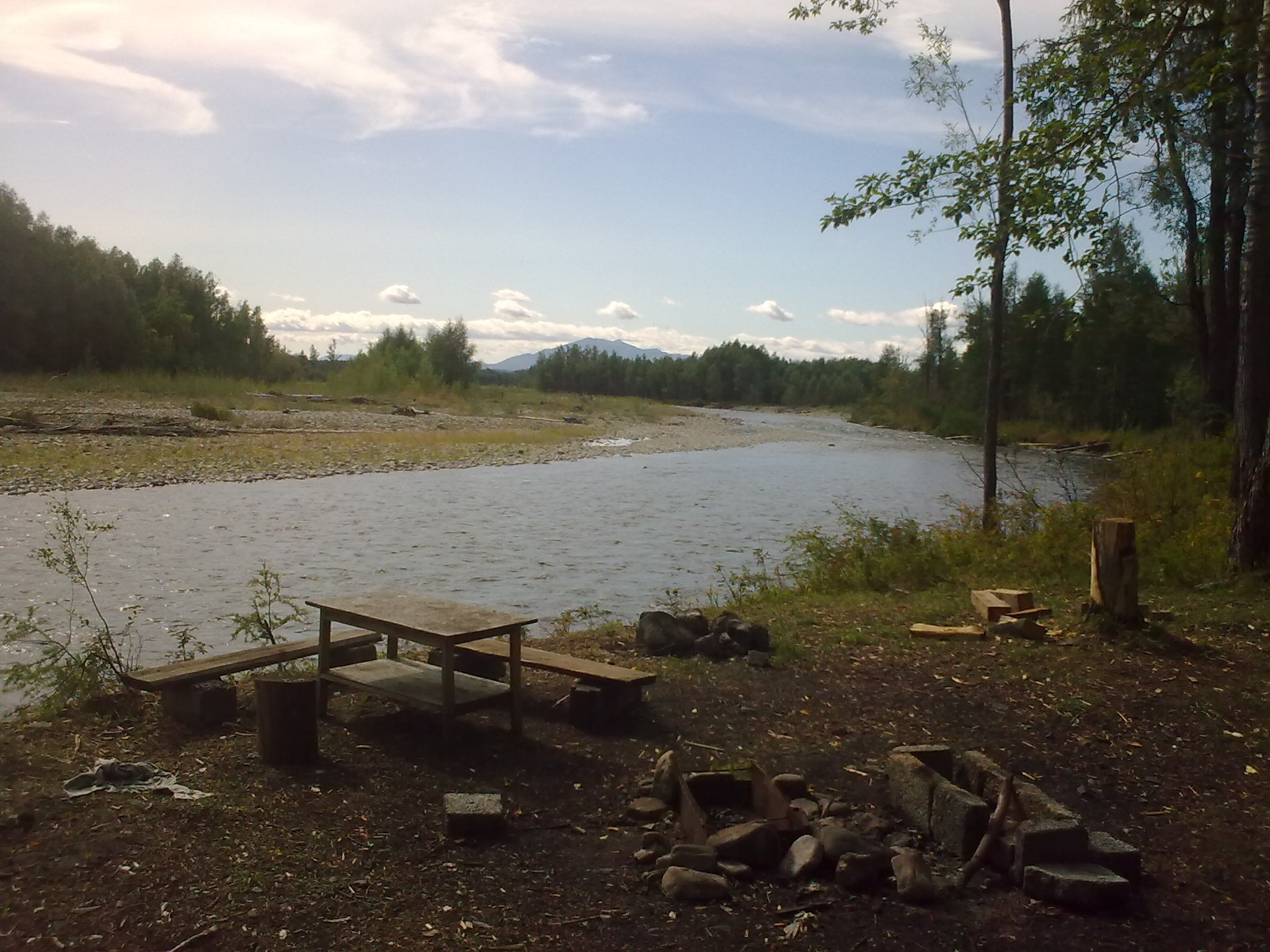
View of the Khasyn, the main tributary of the Arman.

== Fauna ==
The river is a spawning ground for salmon. Other main fish species in the Arman are coho salmon, grayling, Dolly Varden char and kundzha.

== See also ==
- List of rivers of Russia
