= Atka, Russia =

Atka Атка
- Urban-type settlement
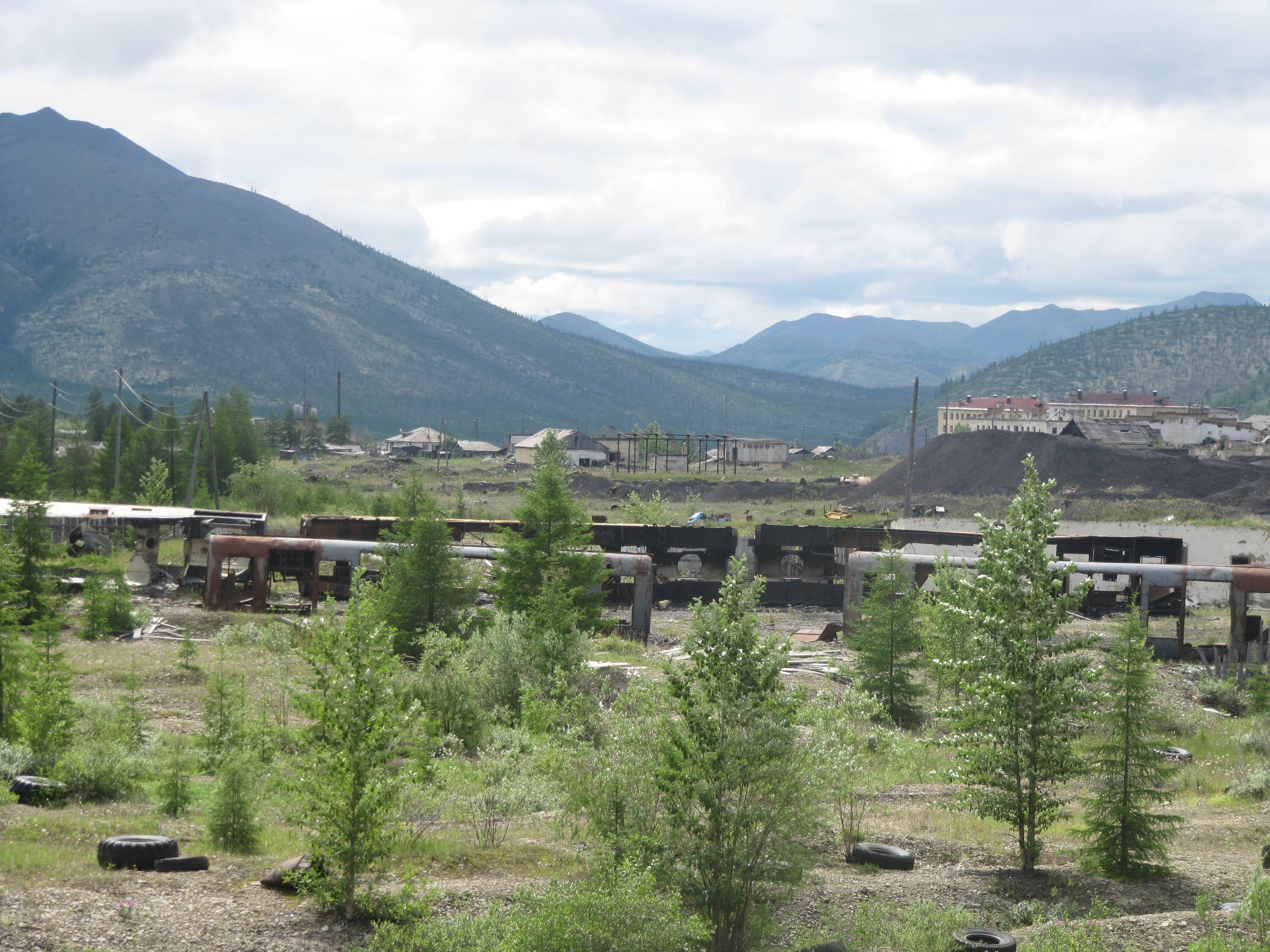
- Atka in 2011
- Interactive map of Atka
- Location of Atka Atka (Magadan Oblast)
- Coordinates: 60°50′10″N 151°47′30″E
- Country: Russia
- Federal subject: Magadan Oblast
- Administrative district: Khasynsky District
- Elevation: 884 m (2,900 ft)

Population (2010 Census)
  - Total: 485
  - Estimate (2025): 6 (−98.8%)
- Time zone: UTC+11 (MSK+8)
- Postal code: 686114
- OKTMO ID: 44719000056

Atka (Russian: Атка) is an urban locality (an urban-type settlement) in Khasynsky District of Magadan Oblast, Russia, located on the Kolyma Highway, 199 kilometers (124 mi) by road north of the oblast's administrative center Magadan. It is located at an elevation of 884 metres (2,900 feet).

== Population ==
The population appears to be steadily decreasing. It is: 485 (2010 census); 604 (2002 census); 2,648 (1989 Soviet census).

== Geography ==
The sources of the Yama are near Atka and the Maltan river flows northwards to the west of the town. The Maymandzhin Range rises above the northern and eastern sides. Atka is on the same longitude as the Sydney, Australia, both lying on the 151st meridian.

== Infrastructure and tourism ==
Some people travelling along the Kolyma Highway from Magadan choose to stop at Atka, as it is generally considered to be an abandoned village and as it is in close proximity (3-4 hours drive, depending on what vehicle you have) to Magadan, and you can stop in the town of Palatka which is between them on the way.

In Atka, there is some infrastructure such as a large hammer and sickle monument which is the first stop at the southern edge of the town, a café with basic food items at the north side of town and there are many buildings in the town including some solid concrete buildings here in fairly good condition and a lot of wooden buildings that are in a relatively worse shape. However, the Magadan fire service sometimes comes out and sets fire to some of these buildings to practice extinguishing them, so it is best to keep away from houses that appear to be burnt.

== History ==
It was granted urban-type settlement status in 1953.

== Climate ==
Atka has a subarctic climate (Köppen climate classification Dfc), with cool, humid summers and severe to extreme winters.

Climate data for Atka
Month	Jan	Feb	Mar	Apr	May	Jun	Jul	Aug	Sep	Oct	Nov	Dec	Year
Record high °C (°F)	−4.0 (24.8)	0.0 (32.0)	3.0 (37.4)	7.5 (45.5)	21.1 (70.0)	29.0 (84.2)	31.1 (88.0)	29.4 (84.9)	22.2 (72.0)	10.5 (50.9)	0.0 (32.0)	0.0 (32.0)	31.1 (88.0)
Mean daily maximum °C (°F)	−26.9 (−16.4)	−23.7 (−10.7)	−17.2 (1.0)	−7.1 (19.2)	4.0 (39.2)	14.8 (58.6)	17.6 (63.7)	14.9 (58.8)	6.8 (44.2)	−6.9 (19.6)	−20.1 (−4.2)	−26.0 (−14.8)	−5.8 (21.5)
Daily mean °C (°F)	−30.6 (−23.1)	−28.2 (−18.8)	−23.2 (−9.8)	−13.2 (8.2)	−0.2 (31.6)	9.0 (48.2)	12.0 (53.6)	9.2 (48.6)	1.7 (35.1)	−12.2 (10.0)	−24.7 (−12.5)	−30.1 (−22.2)	−10.9 (12.4)
Mean daily minimum °C (°F)	−34.3 (−29.7)	−32.8 (−27.0)	−29.1 (−20.4)	−19.3 (−2.7)	−6.0 (21.2)	1.7 (35.1)	5.1 (41.2)	2.7 (36.9)	−3.9 (25.0)	−17.5 (0.5)	−29.4 (−20.9)	−34.2 (−29.6)	−16.4 (2.5)
Record low °C (°F)	−53.9 (−65.0)	−53.9 (−65.0)	−51.1 (−60.0)	−37.8 (−36.0)	−28.9 (−20.0)	−9.6 (14.7)	−6.1 (21.0)	−11.1 (12.0)	−25.0 (−13.0)	−43.9 (−47.0)	−55.0 (−67.0)	−57.8 (−72.0)	−57.8 (−72.0)
Average precipitation mm (inches)	21.1 (0.83)	23.3 (0.92)	31.3 (1.23)	71.6 (2.82)	74.4 (2.93)	77.4 (3.05)	97.7 (3.85)	70.5 (2.78)	88.6 (3.49)	59.8 (2.35)	41.3 (1.63)	24.9 (0.98)	681.9 (26.86)
Source: climatebase.ru
