= Khasynsky District =

Khasynsky District Хасынский район (Russian)
- District
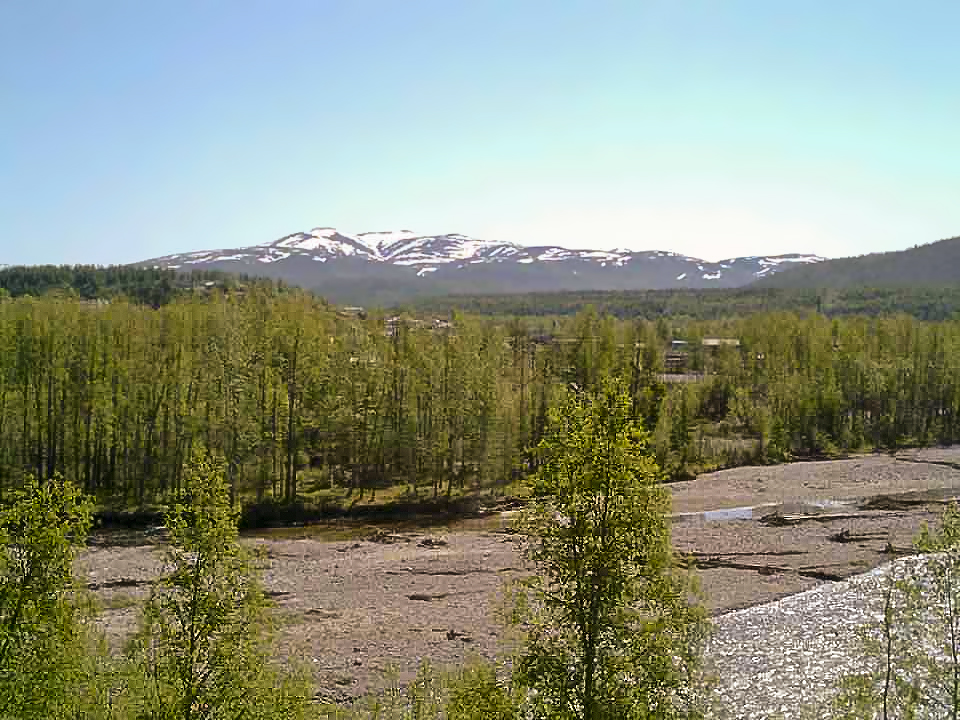
- View of Khasynsky District near Palatka

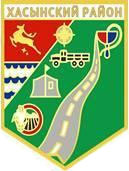
- Coat of arms
- Location of Khasynsky District in Magadan Oblast
- Coordinates: 60°05′N 150°55′E
- Country: Russia
- Federal subject: Magadan Oblast
- Established: December 30, 1966
- Administrative center: Palatka

Area
  - Total: 19,252.44 km^{2} (7,433.41 sq mi)

Population (2010 Census)
  - Total: 8,141
  - Estimate (January 2017): 6,675
  - Density: 0.4229/km^{2} (1.095/sq mi)
  - Urban: 92.2%
  - Rural: 7.8%

Administrative structure
  - Inhabited localities: 4 urban-type settlements, 8 rural localities

Municipal structure
  - Municipally incorporated as: Khasynsky Urban Okrug
- Time zone: UTC+11 (MSK+8)
- OKTMO ID: 44719000
- Website: http://adm-hasyn.ru

Population of Khasynsky District
- 2010 Census: 8,141
- 2002 Census: 10,465
- 1989 Census: 30,866
- 1979 Census: 26,502

Khasynsky District (Russian: Хасы́нский райо́н) is an administrative district (raion), one of the eight in Magadan Oblast, Russia. As a municipal division, it is incorporated as Khasynsky Urban Okrug. Its administrative center is the urban locality (an urban-type settlement) of Palatka. As of the 2010 Census, the total population of the district was 8,141, with the population of Palatka accounting for 52.1% of that number.

== Geography ==
It is located in the south of the oblast and borders Yagodninsky and Srednekansky Districts in the north, Omsukchansky and Olsky Districts in the east, the territory of the town of oblast significance of Magadan in the south, and Olsky and Tenkinsky Districts in the west. The area of the district is 19,252.44 square kilometers (7,433.41 sq mi). Rivers Buyunda, Bakhapcha and Maltan flow northwards across the district at the western end of the Kolyma Mountains, in the area near the Upper Kolyma Highlands. The Arman, the Khasyn and the Yama flow southwards. The main mountain range in the district is the Maymandzhin Range.

== History ==
The district was established on December 30, 1966 from parts of the territories of the town of Magadan and Yagodninsky and Tenkinsky Districts, and was named after the Khasyn River.

== Administrative and municipal status ==
Within the framework of administrative divisions, Khasynsky District is one of the eight in the oblast. The urban locality (an urban-type settlement) of Palatka serves as its administrative center.

As a municipal division, the district has been incorporated as Khasynsky Urban Okrug since May 1, 2015. Prior to that date, the district was incorporated as Khasynsky Municipal District, which was subdivided into four urban settlements and one rural settlement.
