= Omsukchan Range =

Mountain range in Russia

- Омсукчанский хребет
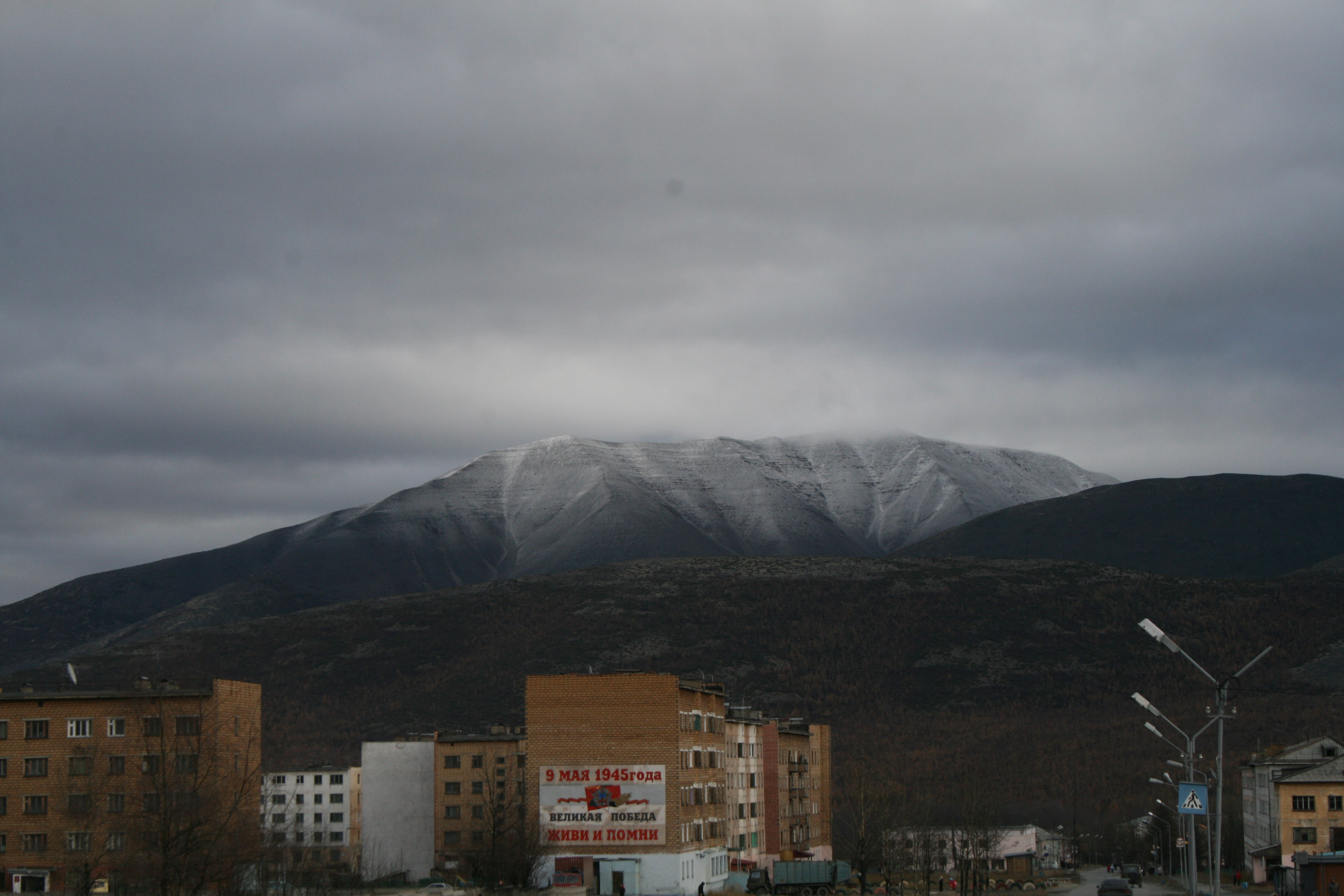
- View of the range above Omsukchan Town

Highest point
- Peak: Gora Nevskaya
- Elevation: 1,962 m (6,437 ft)

Dimensions
- Length: 300 km (190 mi) N/S
- Width: 40 km (25 mi) E/W

Geography
- Location within Far Eastern Federal District
- Country: Russia
- Federal subject: Magadan Oblast
- Range coordinates: 63°0′N 155°15′E
- Parent range: Kolyma Highlands, East Siberian System

Geology
- Orogeny: Alpine orogeny
- Rock ages: Cretaceous and Mesozoic
- Rock types: Sandstone and schist

Climbing
- Easiest route: From Omsukchan

The Omsukchan Range (Russian: Омсукчанский хребет) is a mountain range in the Magadan Oblast, Far Eastern Federal District, Russia. The nearest city is Omsukchan, the capital of Omsukchan District, and the nearest airport Omsukchan Airport.

A branch of the Kolyma Highway, the Omsukchan Highway, passes through the middle section of the ridge, across the Kapranovsky Pass. The mountains have rich deposits of tin, gold and silver. Ken Mountain, a conical peak which is a tourist attraction, is located in the range.

== Geography ==
The Omsukchan Range rises in the southernmost sector of the Kolyma Highlands System. The range runs between the Balygychan River valley in the west and the Sugoy River valley in the east, both right tributaries of the Kolyma. The highest mountain of the range is 1,962 metres (6,437 ft) high Gora Nevskaya, located southwest of Omsukchan Town. This peak is also the highest of the Kolyma Highlands. The highest point in Magadan Oblast, however, is the highest peak of the Okhandya Range.

The range stretches in a roughly north / south direction for over 300 kilometers (190 mi), from the confluence of the Kolyma River and the Sugoy in the north, to the northern end of the Tumansky Range in the south. The right tributaries of the Balygychan River, such as the Kirchan, Dzhagin, Bulur and Nyagain, as well as all the left tributaries of the Sugoy, such as the Marat and the Volna, have their sources in the range.

The relief of the northern section of the range is characterized by smooth slopes and rounded tops. The highest peaks are found in the south, where the shape of the range becomes clearly alpine with sharp and craggy peaks and ridges, as well as steep scree slopes.

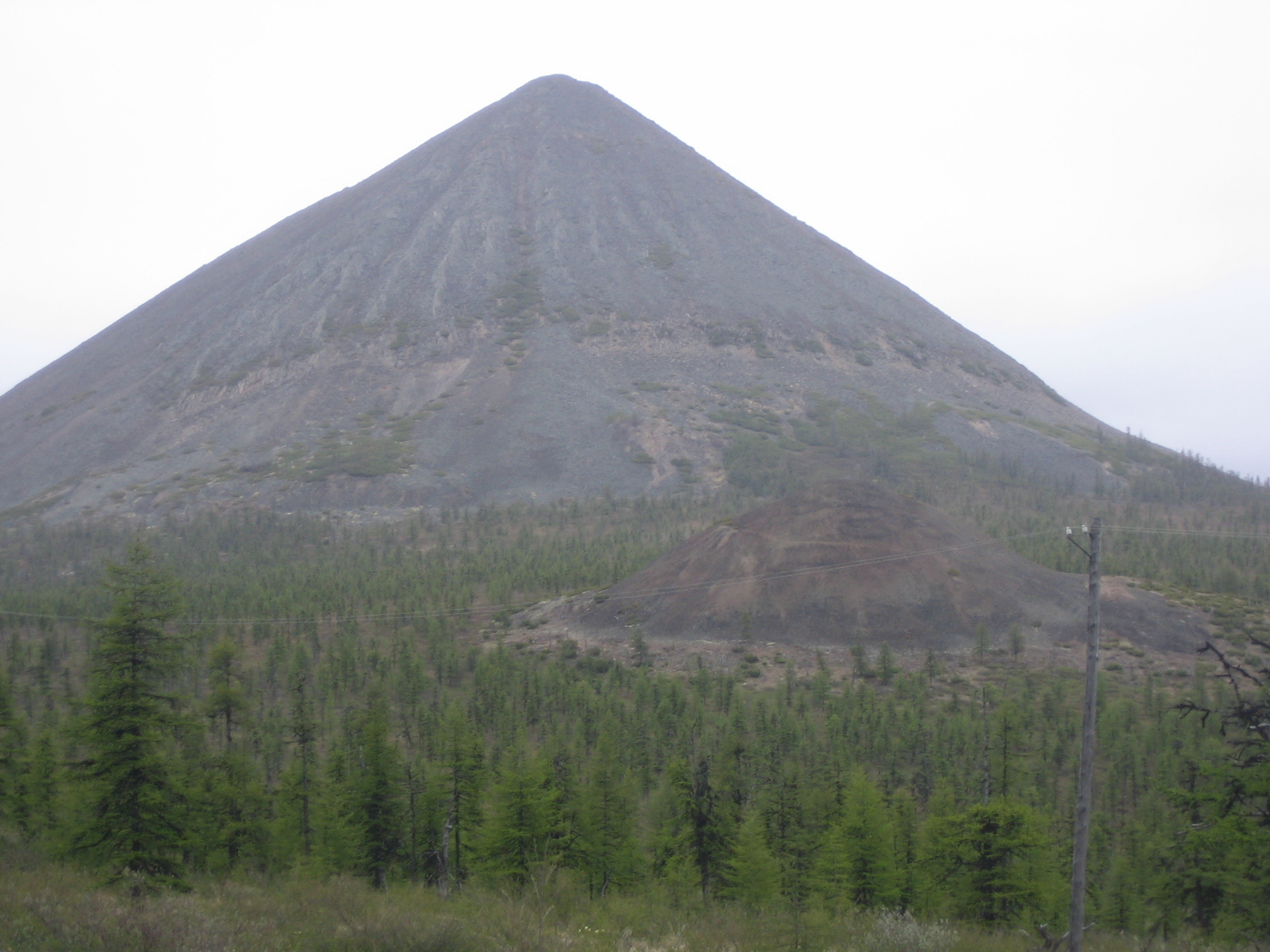
View of Ken Mountain.

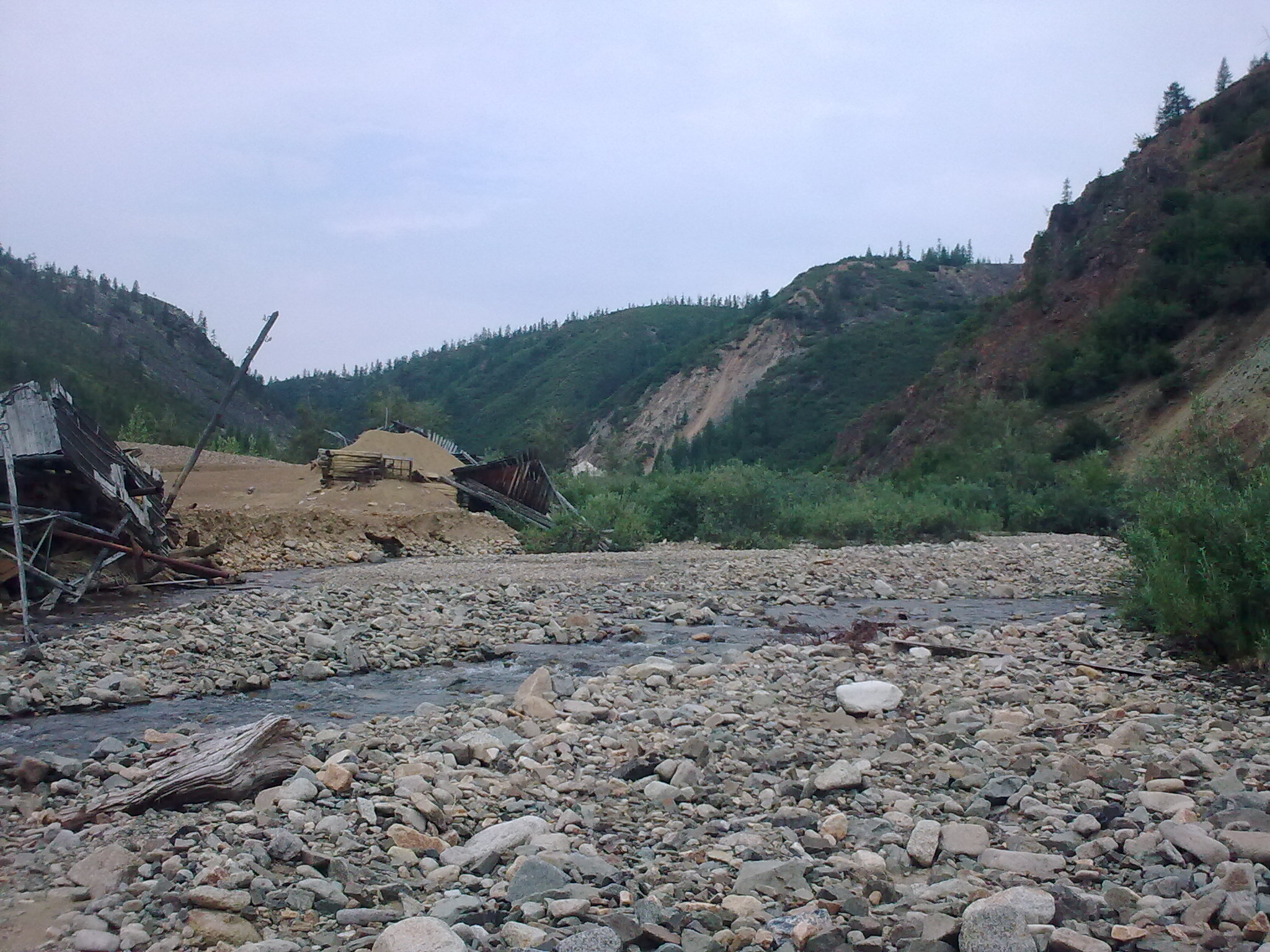
Abandoned Trud settlement.

== Flora ==
The slopes of the range are mostly bare and have a barren look. In certain locations they are covered with larch forests until elevations of about 800 metres (2,600 ft), above which the forest is replaced by mountain tundra and rocky tops. There are poplar forests in the valleys.

== See also ==
- Dukat, Russia, a mining town in the range
