= Omulyovka =

- Mouth location in Yakutia, Russia

Location
- Country: Russia

Physical characteristics
- Source
  - location: Okhandya Range
- Mouth: Yasachnaya
  - coordinates: 65.1105°N 151.1747°E
- Length: 410 km (250 mi)
- Basin size: 13,500 km^{2} (5,200 sq mi)

Basin features
- Progression: Yasachnaya→ Kolyma→ East Siberian Sea

The Omulyovka (Russian: Омулёвка) is a river in Magadan Oblast and Sakha Republic, Russia. It is a left tributary of the Yasachnaya. It is 410 kilometres (250 mi) long, and has a drainage basin of 13,500 square kilometres (5,200 sq mi).

== See also ==
- List of rivers of Russia
