= Kolyma Mountains =

Mountain range in Siberia

- Колымское нагорье
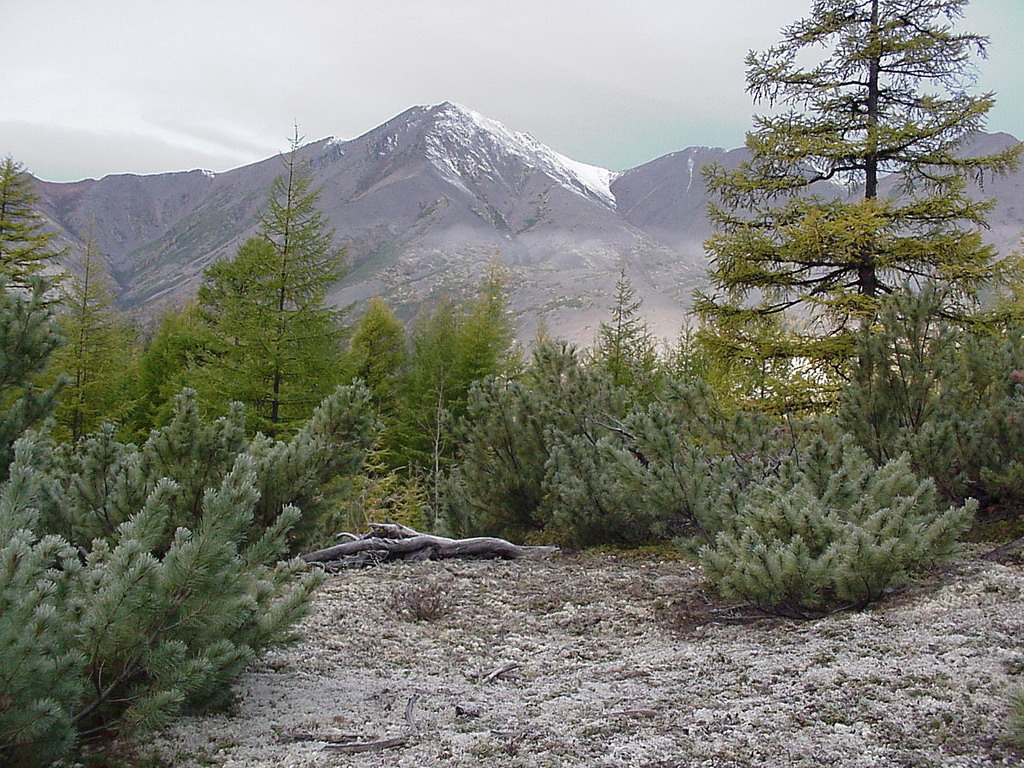
- Mountains in the Tenkinsky District

Highest point
- Peak: Gora Nevskaya
- Elevation: 1,828 m (5,997 ft)

Dimensions
- Length: 1,300 km (810 mi)

Geography
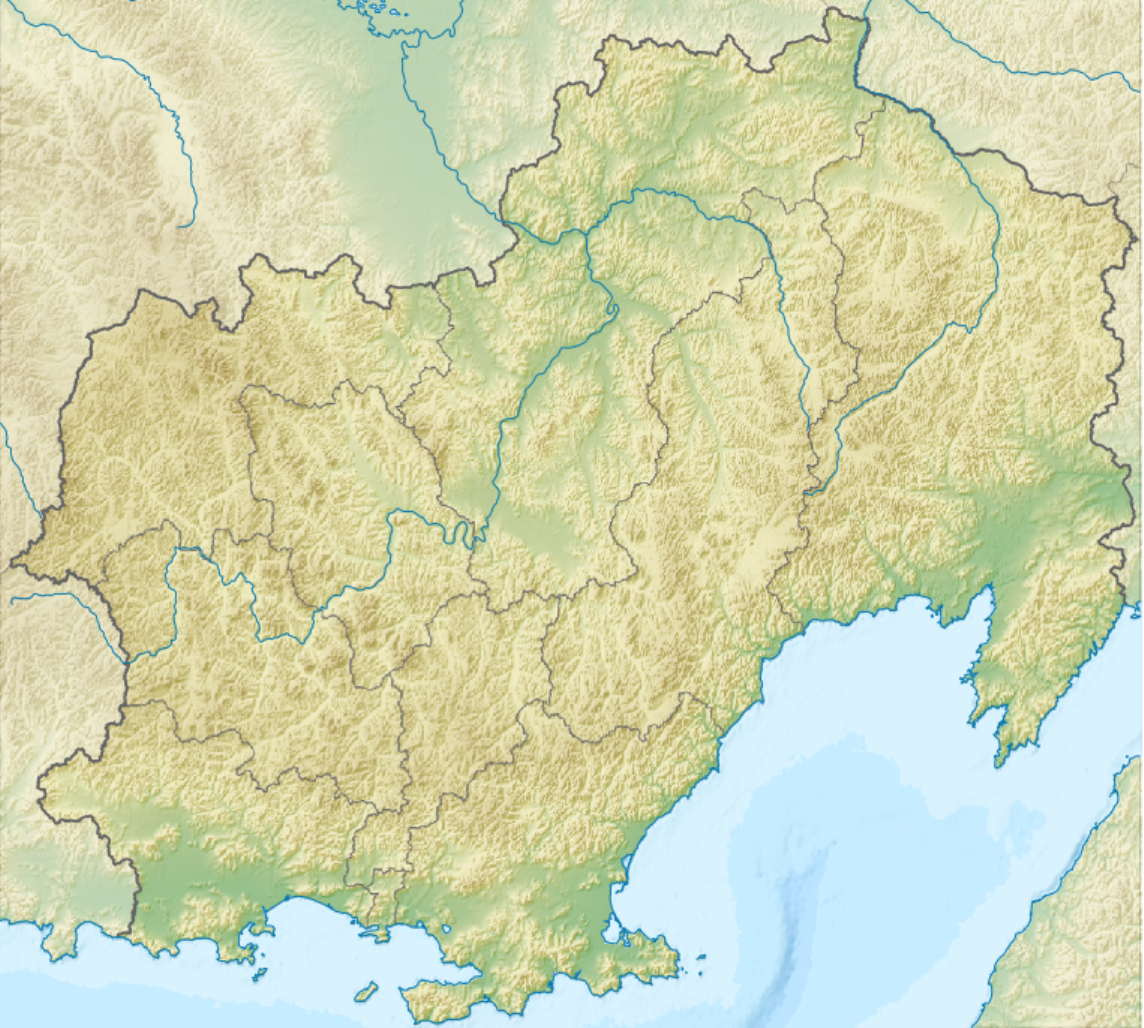
- Location within Far Eastern Federal District Location within Magadan Oblast
- Country: Russia
- Oblast/Okrug/Krai: Magadan, Chukotka and Kamchatka
- Range coordinates: 64°N 159°E
- Parent range: East Siberian System

Geology
- Rock ages: Jurassic, Triassic, Permian and Proterozoic
- Rock types: Granite, Gneiss, Schist, Siltstone and Sandstone

The Kolyma Mountains or Kolyma Upland (Russian: Колымское нагорье, romanized: Kolymskoye Nagorye), is a system of mountain ranges in northeastern Siberia, lying mostly within the Magadan Oblast, along the shores of the Sea of Okhotsk in the Kolyma region. It constitutes the watershed between the basins of Kolyma River and of the Sea of Okhotsk / Pacific Ocean.

The range's highest point is Mount Nevskaya (гора Невская) in the Omsukchan Range at 1,828 meters (5,997 ft).

== Geography ==
The Kolyma Mountains stretch 1,300 kilometers (810 mi) on a NW-SW alignment and consists of a series of plateaus and ridges punctuated by granite peaks that typically range between 1,500 to 1,800 meters (4,900 to 5,900 ft).

To the west and southwest the Upper Kolyma Highlands are bound by the Seymchan-Buyunda Depression to the north and the Ola river basin to the south. The Yukaghir Highlands, highest point Mount Chubukulakh, rise to the northwest, the Anadyr Highlands to the north and northeast and the Koryak Highlands to the east.

=== Subranges ===
Besides the Omsukchan Range, the system of the Kolyma Mountains comprises a number of subranges. Most are located in Magadan Oblast:

- Korkodon Range, highest point 1,760 metres (5,770 ft)
- Kongin Range, highest point 1,561 metres (5,121 ft)
- Molkaty Range, highest point 1,663 metres (5,456 ft)
- Kilgan Massif, highest point 1,098 metres (3,602 ft)
- Maymandzhin Range, highest point 1,809 metres (5,935 ft)
- Kedon Range, highest point 1,639 metres (5,377 ft)
- Molongdin Range, highest point 1,644 metres (5,394 ft) (the eastern end is in Kamchatka Krai)

The northernmost ranges are located in the Chukotka Autonomous Okrug

- Kuryin Range (курьинский кряж), highest point 1,030 metres (3,380 ft)
- Oloy Range, highest point 1,816 metres (5,958 ft)
- Ush-Urekchen, highest point 1,685 metres (5,528 ft)

=== Hydrography ===
Many right tributaries of the Kolyma River have their sources in the northern and northwestern slopes of the Kolyma Highlands, including the Bakhapcha, Buyunda, Balygychan, Sugoy, Korkodon —with its tributary Bulun, and the Omolon —with its tributaries Molongda, Oloy, Kedon and Kegali. The rivers originating in the southern and southeastern slopes of the mountain area flow into the Sea of Okhotsk and are shorter: Ola, Yama, Gizhiga, Paren and Penzhina.

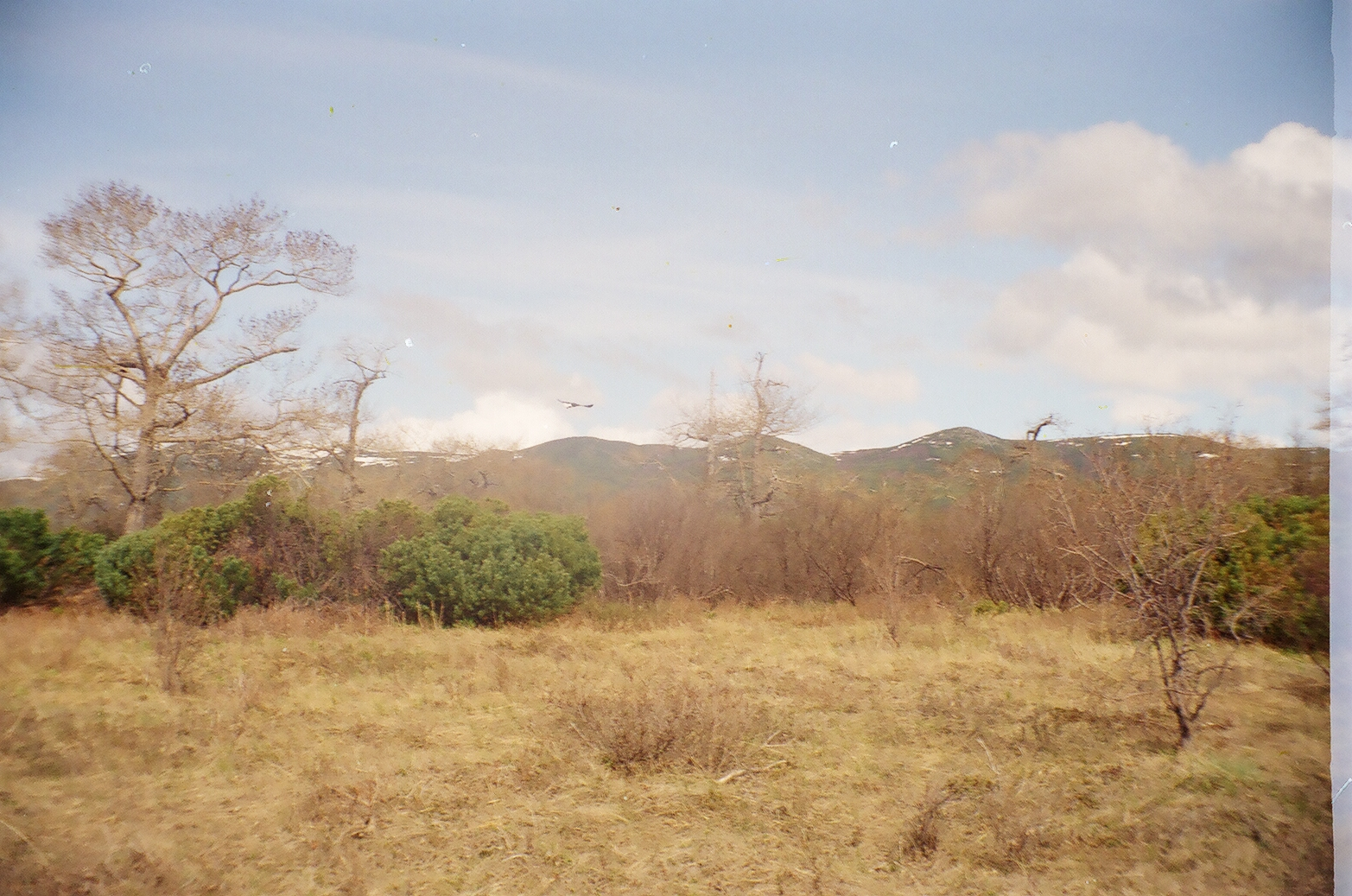
Mountains in Severo-Evensky District

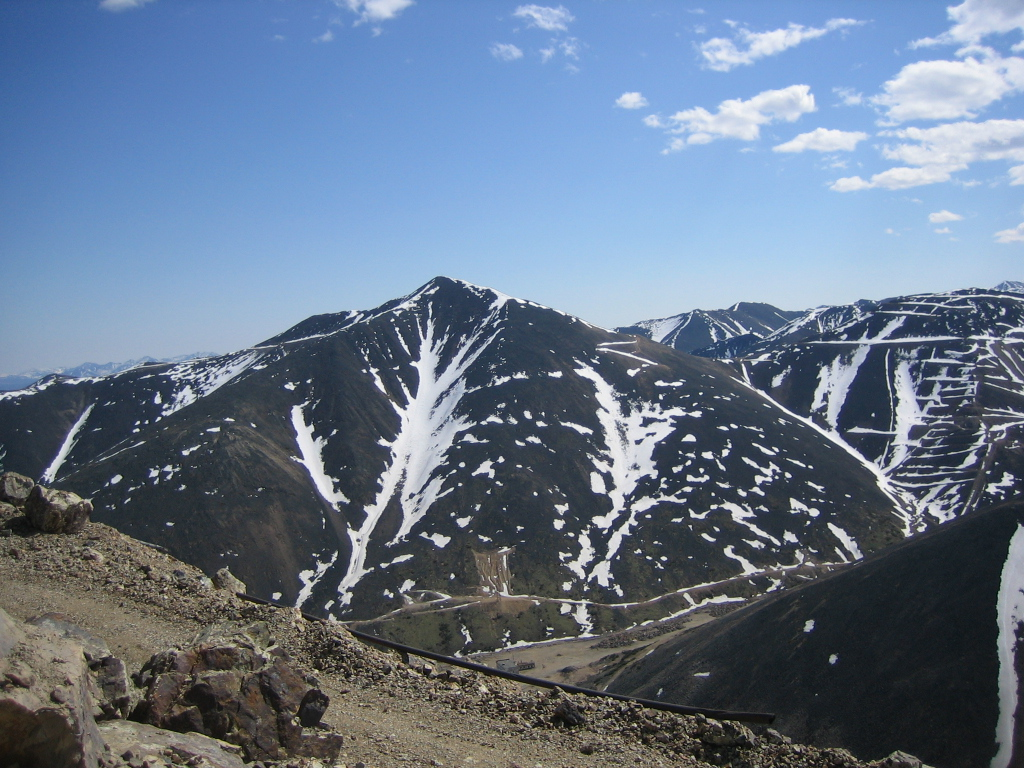
View of the Omsukchan Range from Dukat Mine
