= Gora Nevskaya =

Mountain in Russia

- гора Невская
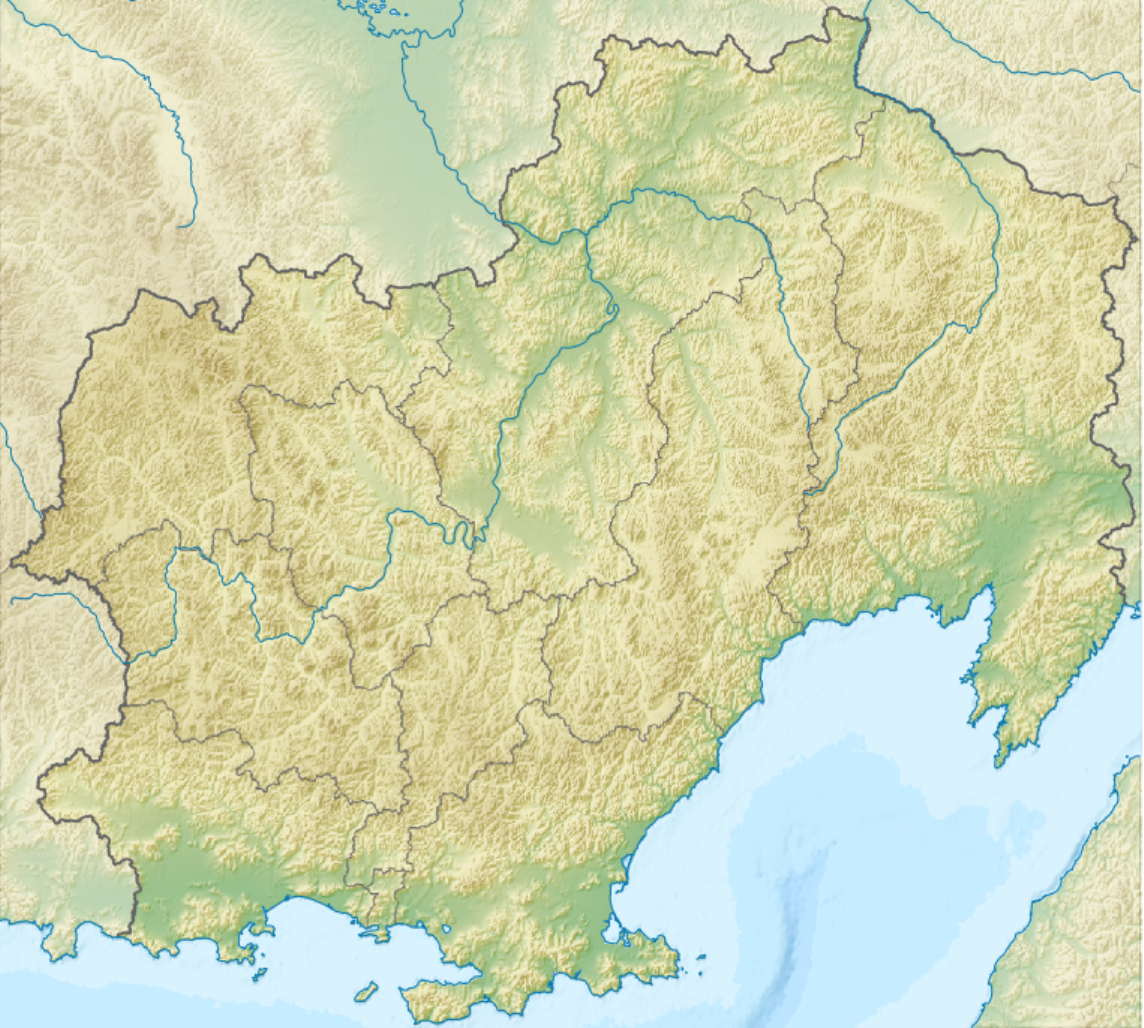
- Location within Magadan Oblast

Highest point
- Elevation: 1,828 m (5,997 ft)
- Coordinates: 62°13′00″N 155°26′00″E

Geography
- Location: Magadan Oblast, Russian Far East
- Parent range: Omsukchan Range, Kolyma Mountains

Gora Nevskaya (Russian: гора Невская, meaning "Nevsky Mountain") is a mountain in the Omsukchan Range, Kolyma Mountains. Administratively, it is part of the Magadan Oblast, Russian Federation.

This 1,828 m (5,997 ft) high mountain is the highest point of the Kolyma Mountains, part of the East Siberian Mountains. The highest point in Magadan Oblast, however, is the highest peak of the Okhandya Range.

A Dalstroy Aviation Antonov An-2 crashed on the mountainside by Mount Nevskaya in June 1951.

== See also ==
- List of mountains in Russia
