= Zyryanka (disambiguation) =

Zyryanka (Russian: Зырянка) is the name of several places in Russia.

Urban localities

- Zyryanka, an urban-type settlement in the Verkhnekolymsky District of the Sakha Republic

Rural localities

- Zyryanka, Kemerovo Oblast, a village in Akatsiyevskaya Rural Territory of Tyazhinsky District of Kemerovo Oblast
- Zyryanka, Krasnoyarsk Krai, a village in Kurbatovsky Selsoviet of Kazachinsky District of Krasnoyarsk Krai
- Zyryanka, Kataysky District, Kurgan Oblast, a selo in Zyryansky Selsoviet of Kataysky District of Kurgan Oblast
- Zyryanka, Yurgamyshsky District, Kurgan Oblast, a settlement in Chineyevsky Selsoviet of Yurgamyshsky District of Kurgan Oblast
- Zyryanka, Novosibirsk Oblast, a settlement in Chulymsky District of Novosibirsk Oblast
- Zyryanka, Ishimsky District, Tyumen Oblast, a village in Strekhninsky Rural Okrug of Ishimsky District of Tyumen Oblast
- Zyryanka, Tyumensky District, Tyumen Oblast, a village in Uspensky Rural Okrug of Tyumensky District of Tyumen Oblast

Rivers

- Zyryanka (river), a tributary of the Kolyma in Sakha
