= Byoryolyokh (Ayan-Yuryakh) =

Siberian river

Byoryolyokh Бёрёлёх
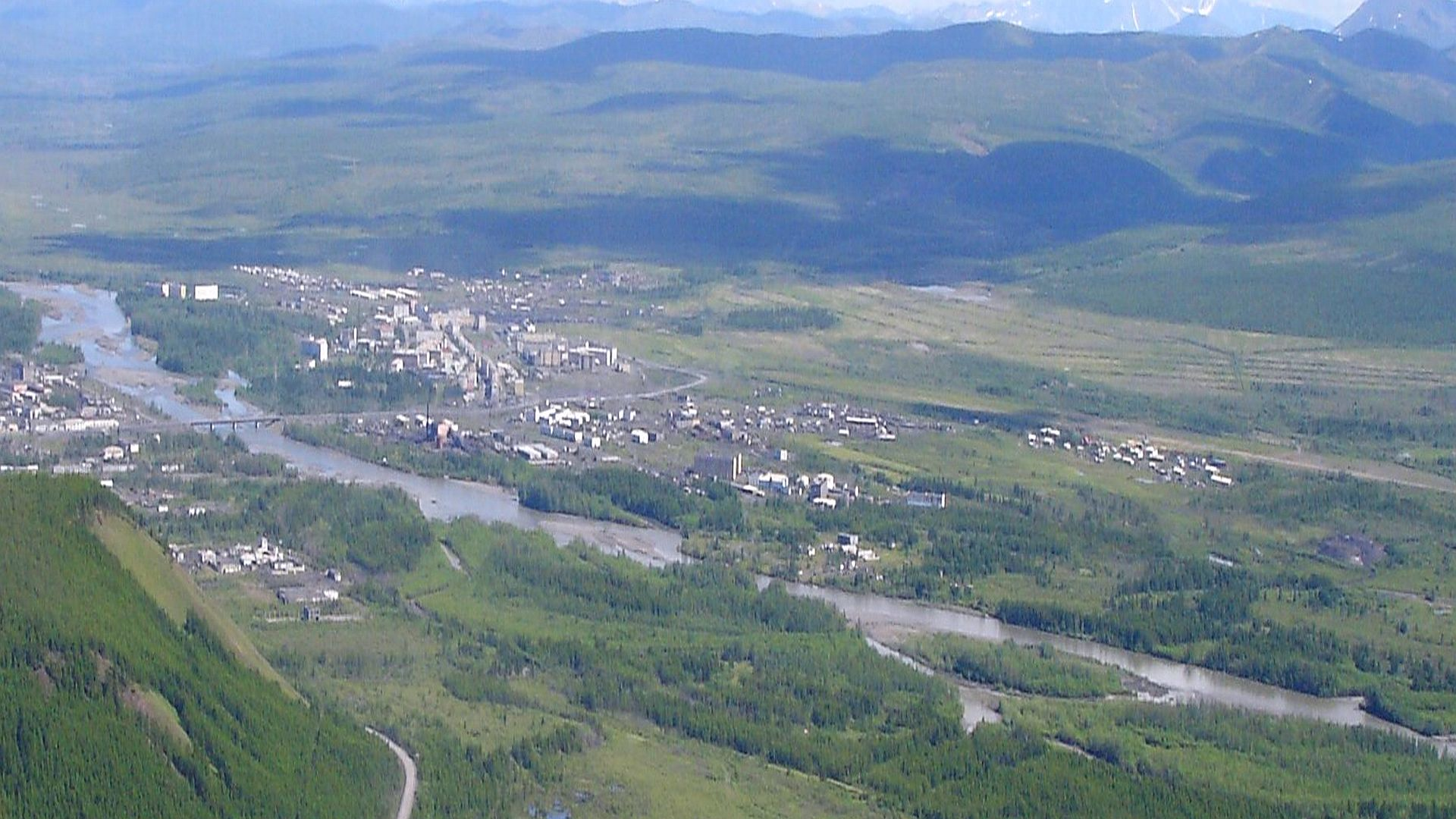
- The Byoryolokh flowing across Susuman town

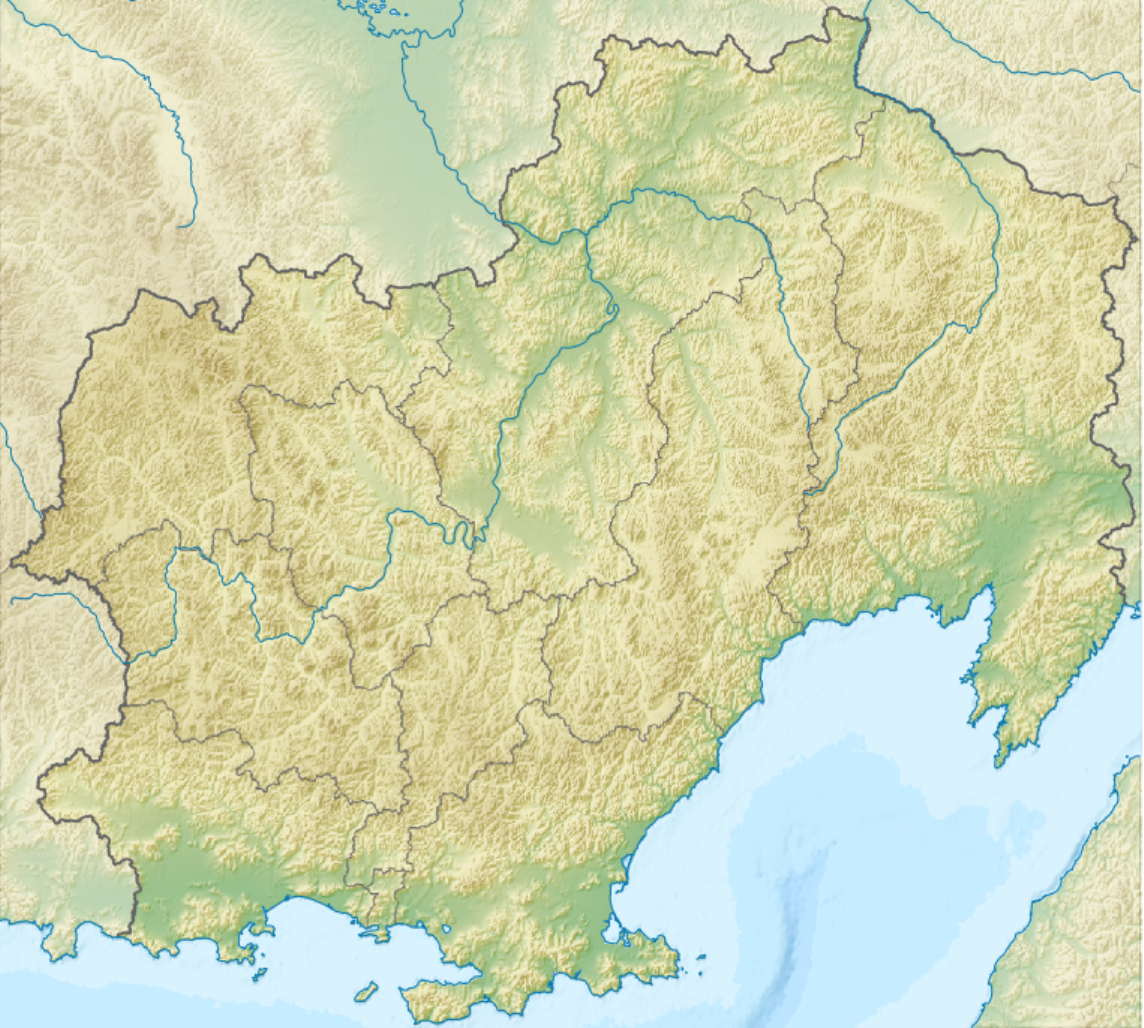
- Mouth location in Magadan Oblast, Russia

Physical characteristics
- Source: Okhandya Range
  - location: Susumansky District, Magadan Oblast, Russia
  - coordinates: 63°55′49″N 146°59′47″E
  - elevation: 1,540 metres (5,050 ft)
- Mouth: Ayan-Yuryakh
  - coordinates: 62°24′55″N 147°32′13″E
  - elevation: 545 metres (1,788 ft)
- Length: 239 kilometres (149 mi)
- Basin size: 9,810 square kilometres (3,790 sq mi)
- Discharge
  - average: 315 m^{3}/s (11,100 cu ft/s)

Basin features
- Progression: Ayan-Yuryakh → Kolyma→ East Siberian Sea

The Byoryolyokh (Russian: Бёрёлёх) is a river in Magadan Oblast, Russian Federation. It is a left tributary of the Ayan-Yuryakh of the Kolyma river basin.

The name of the river is based on the Yakut word "Börölöökh" (Бөрөлөөх), referring to a place where there are wolves.

== History ==
The Byoryolyokh was first put on the map in 1891 by Ivan Chersky and for almost four decades it was thought that it was one of the rivers whose confluence formed the Kolyma. However, after a more thorough survey of the region carried out by Sergei Obruchev in 1929 it was established that the two rivers forming the Kolyma are the Ayan-Yuryakh and the Kulu.

== Course ==
The Byoryolyokh has its sources at the northern end of the Okhandya Range and heads southwards below the western slopes of the range. After passing by Susuman it heads roughly southwestwards and finally it meets the Ayan-Yuryakh shortly upstream from its confluence with the Kulu.

The river flows across the Upper Kolyma Highlands and is fed primarily by rain and snow. Many stretches freeze to the bottom in the winter. The tributaries of the Byoryolyokh are mostly short. Some of the main ones are the 61 kilometres (38 mi) long Burgandya, the 45 kilometres (28 mi) long Taboga, the 44 kilometres (27 mi) long Malyk-Siena flowing from Lake Malyk, the 106 kilometres (66 mi) long Susuman and the 69 kilometres (43 mi) long Sylgybystakh from the left, as well as the 48 kilometres (30 mi) long Chay-Yuryue from the right.

== See also ==
- List of rivers of Russia
