= Yasachnaya =

Yasachnaya Ясачная
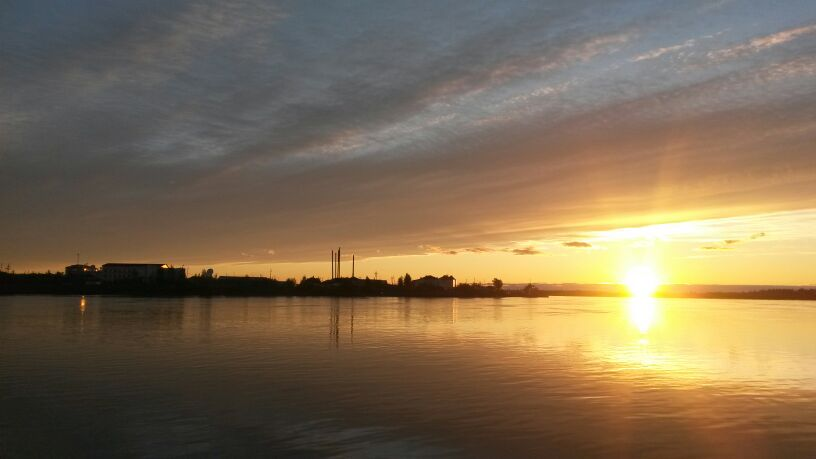

- Mouth location in Yakutia, Russia

Location
- Country: Russia

Physical characteristics
- Source
  - location: Chersky Range
- Mouth: Kolyma
  - coordinates: 65°43′53″N 150°54′39″E
- Length: 490 km (300 mi)
- Basin size: 35,900 km^{2} (13,900 sq mi)

Basin features
- Progression: Kolyma→ East Siberian Sea

The Yasachnaya (Russian: Ясачная; Yakut: Дьаһаак, romanized: Cahaak; Yukaghir: Чаҕадан) is a river in the Russian Far East. It rises in the Chersky Range and meets the Kolyma near the settlement of Zyryanka. It is 490 kilometres (300 mi) long, and has a drainage basin of 35,900 square kilometres (13,900 sq mi). Its main tributaries are Omulyovka, Olguya, Rassokha and Gonyucha, all from the West.

== See also ==
- List of rivers of Russia
