= Kolyma Reservoir =

Hydroelectric reservoir in Upper Kolyma Highlands, Magadan Oblast, Russia

- Колымское водохранилище
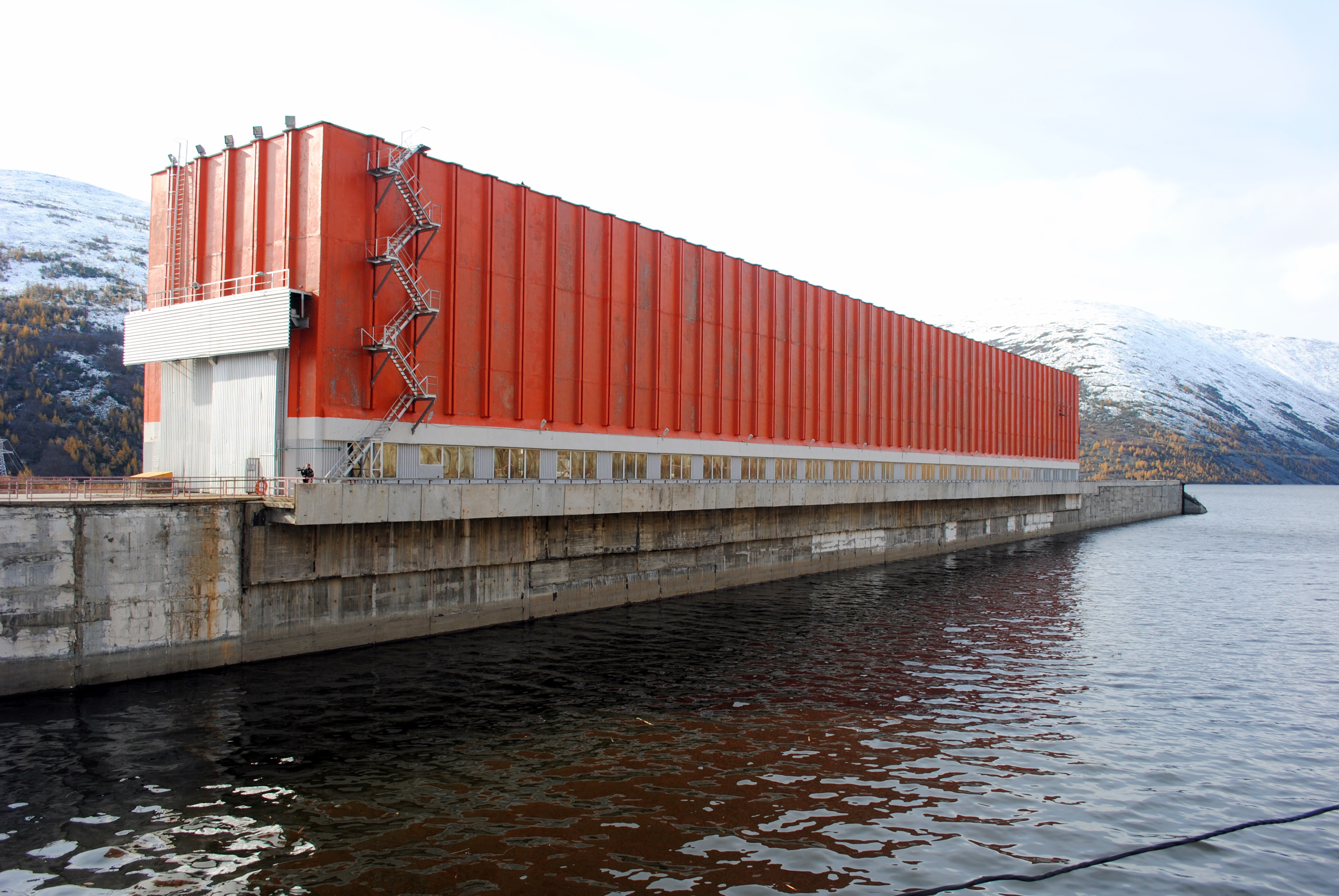
- View of the dam and the lake

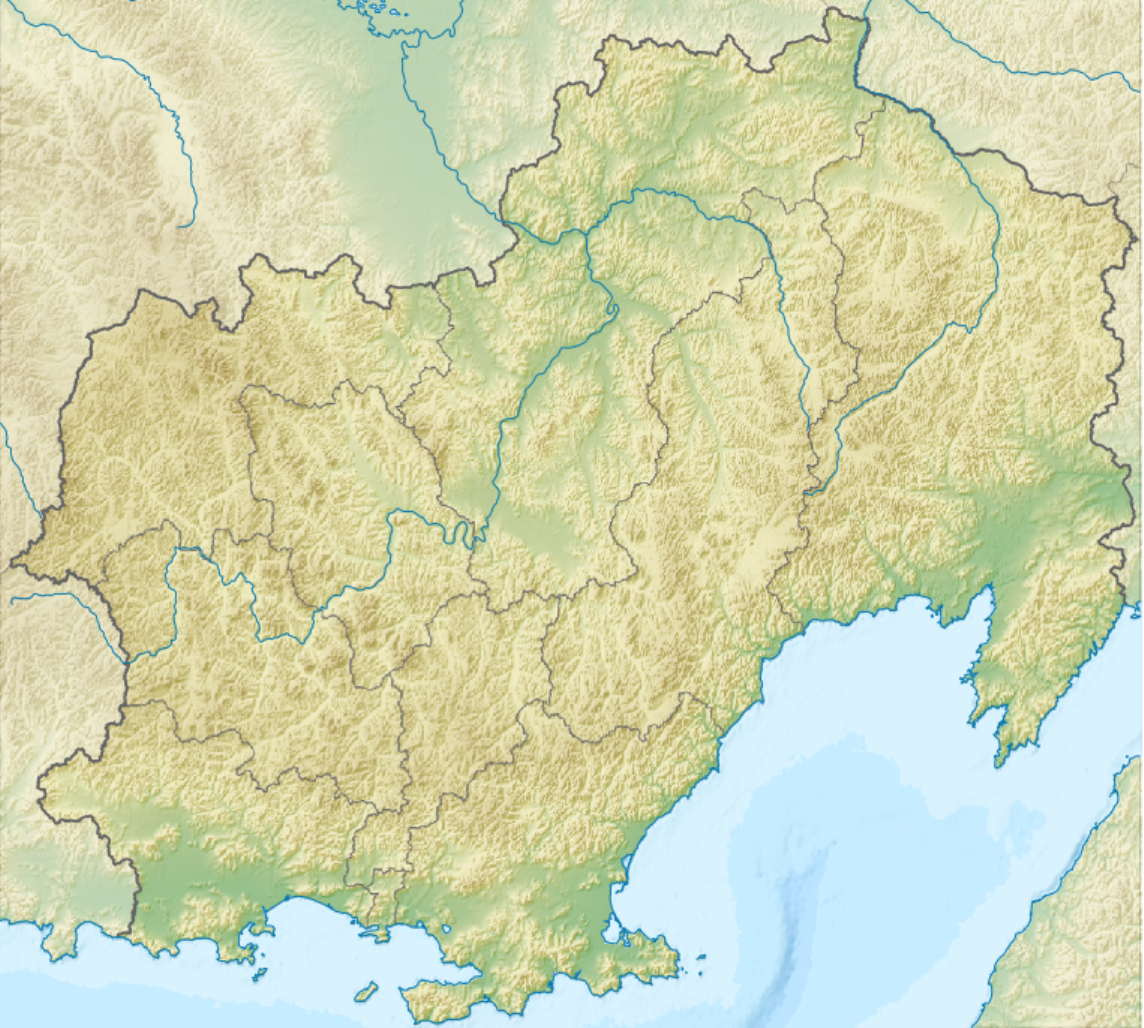
- Location within Russia Location within Magadan Oblast
- Location: Upper Kolyma Highlands; Magadan Oblast
- Coordinates: 62°02′43″N 150°03′11″E
- Type: Hydroelectric reservoir
- Primary inflows: Kolyma, Tenka, Kongo
- Primary outflows: Kolyma
- Catchment area: 61,500 km^{2} (23,700 sq mi)
- Basin countries: Russia
- Max. length: 148 km (92 mi)
- Max. width: 6 km (3.7 mi)
- Surface area: 441 km^{2} (170 sq mi)
- Max. depth: 120 m (390 ft)
- Water volume: 14.56 km^{3} (3.49 cu mi)
- Surface elevation: 387 m (1,270 ft)
- Islands: None
- Settlements: Sinegorye

KolymaReservoir (Russian: Колымское водохранилище) is an artificial lake which was created by the construction of the Kolyma Hydroelectric Station on the Kolyma. It was designed by Lenhydroproject. Filling began in 1980 and it was commissioned in 1995.

== Description ==
The Kolyma Reservoir is in the Upper Kolyma Highlands. The town of Sinegorye, Yagodninsky District, is located downstream from the dam. The total length of the reservoir is 148 km (92 mi) and the width at its widest point is 6 km (3.7 mi). The height of the water's edge is 387 m (1,270 ft) above sea level. Besides the Kolyma, rivers Tenka and Kongo flow into the reservoir.

After filling the reservoir 40,840 ha (100,900 acres) of farmland were flooded, as well as several workers' settlements, including Sibik-Tyllah, Vetreny, Yasnaya Polyana, Tyoply, Yubileiny and Kongo.

An Old Stone Age archaeological site located by the mouth of the Kongo was also flooded by the waters of the Kolyma reservoir. It belonged to the Paleolithic Siberdikov culture of the upper Kolyma river. On it were found stone cutters, knives, arrowheads and pick-shaped tools belonging to a human group engaged in hunting wild horses and reindeer.

== See also ==
- Kolyma Hydroelectric Station
- Ust-Srednekan Hydroelectric Plant
