= Ust-Srednekan =

Ust-Srednekan Усть-Среднекан
- Settlement
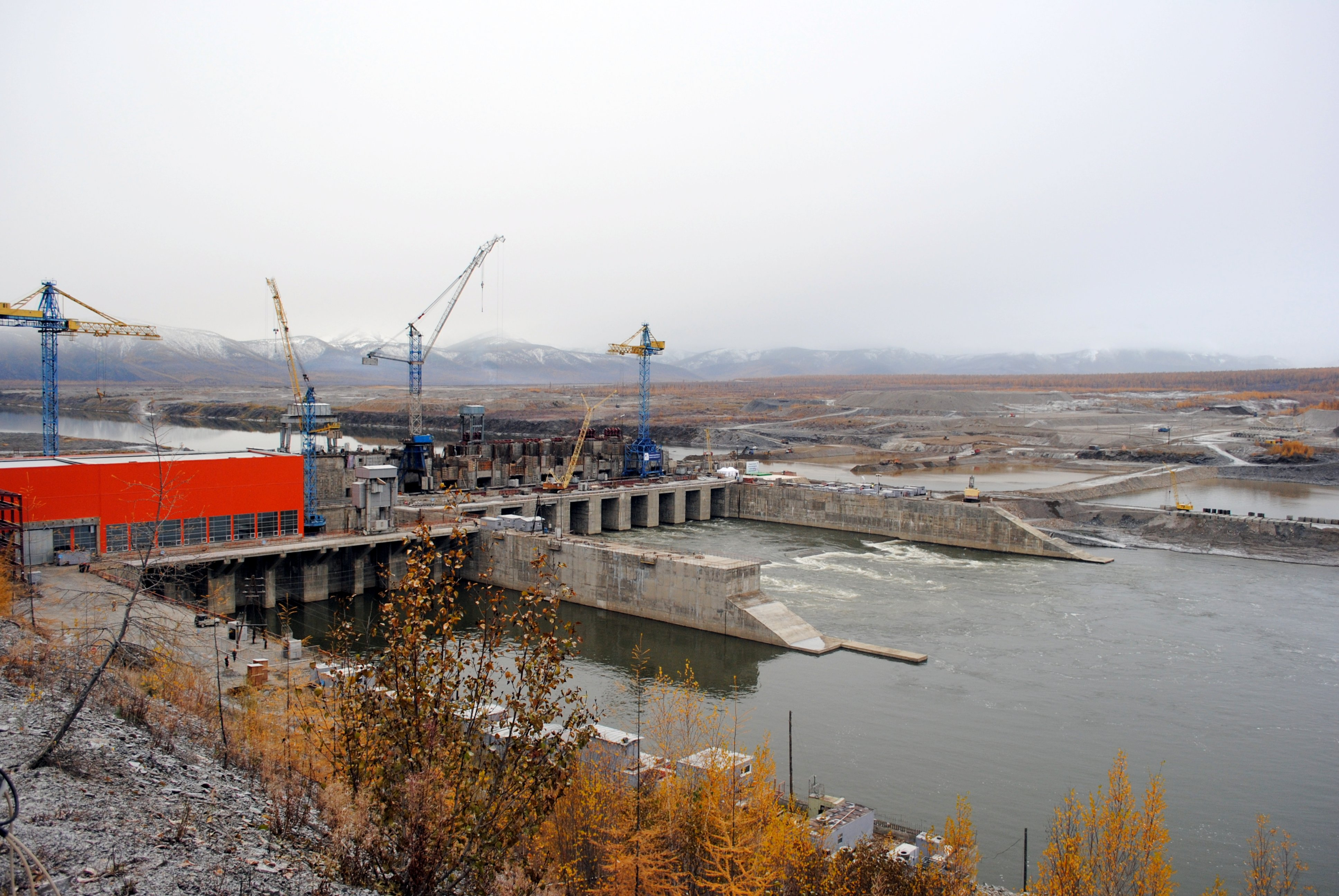
- Ust-Srednekan Hydroelectric Plant

- Location within Magadan Oblast Location within Russia
- Coordinates: 62°27′N 152°20′E
- Country: Russia
- Region: Magadan Oblast
- District: Srednekansky District
- Time zone: UTC+11:00

Ust-Srednekan (Russian: Усть-Среднекан) is a rural locality (a selo) in Srednekansky District of Magadan Oblast, Russia, located on the right bank of the Kolyma River, where it is joined by its tributary the Srednekan, 45 kilometers (28 mi) from Seymchan, the administrative center of the district. Population: 27 (2010 Census). Ust-Srednekan has been completely depopulated since 2013, but it has not been officially abolished.On 5 July 2022, a maximum temperature of 37.7 °C (99.9 °F) was registered.

== History ==
In 1932, it became the seat of administration for the Sevvostlag forced-labor camps, although these operations were later moved to Nagaev Bay and then to the city of Magadan. Ust-Srednekan remained a mining center, although its population decreased so much that in April 2006 it was decided to progressively abandon it. Only twenty-seven inhabitants remained in 2010, with the population fully gone by April 2011.

== Infrastructure and economy ==
Access to Ust-Srednekan is difficult, with roads in poor condition. The not yet completed Ust-Srednekan Hydroelectric Plant is located nearby.
