= Kulu (river) =

Siberian river

Kulu Кулу
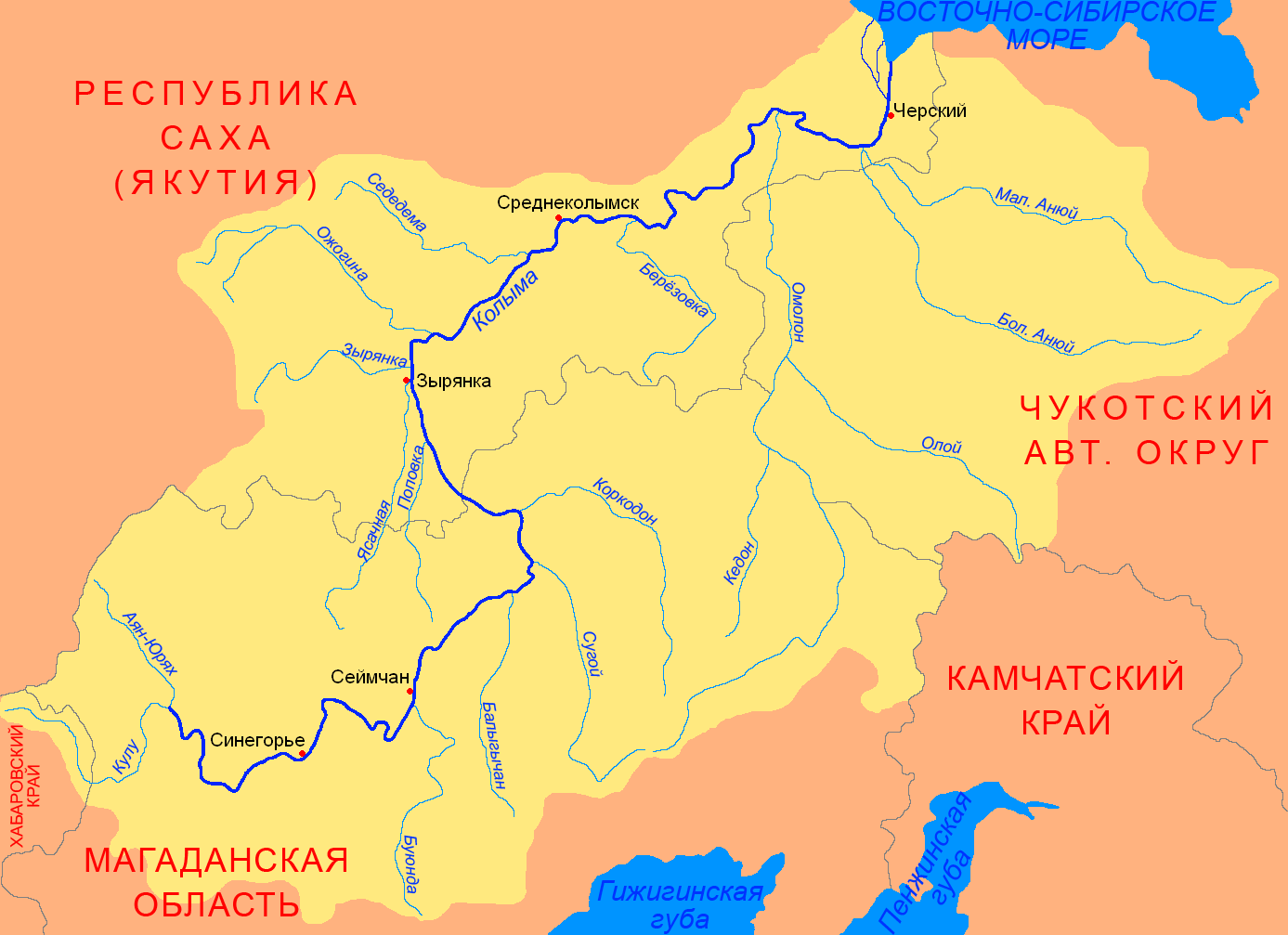
- The Kulu and the Ayan-Yuryakh are located at the head of the Kolyma

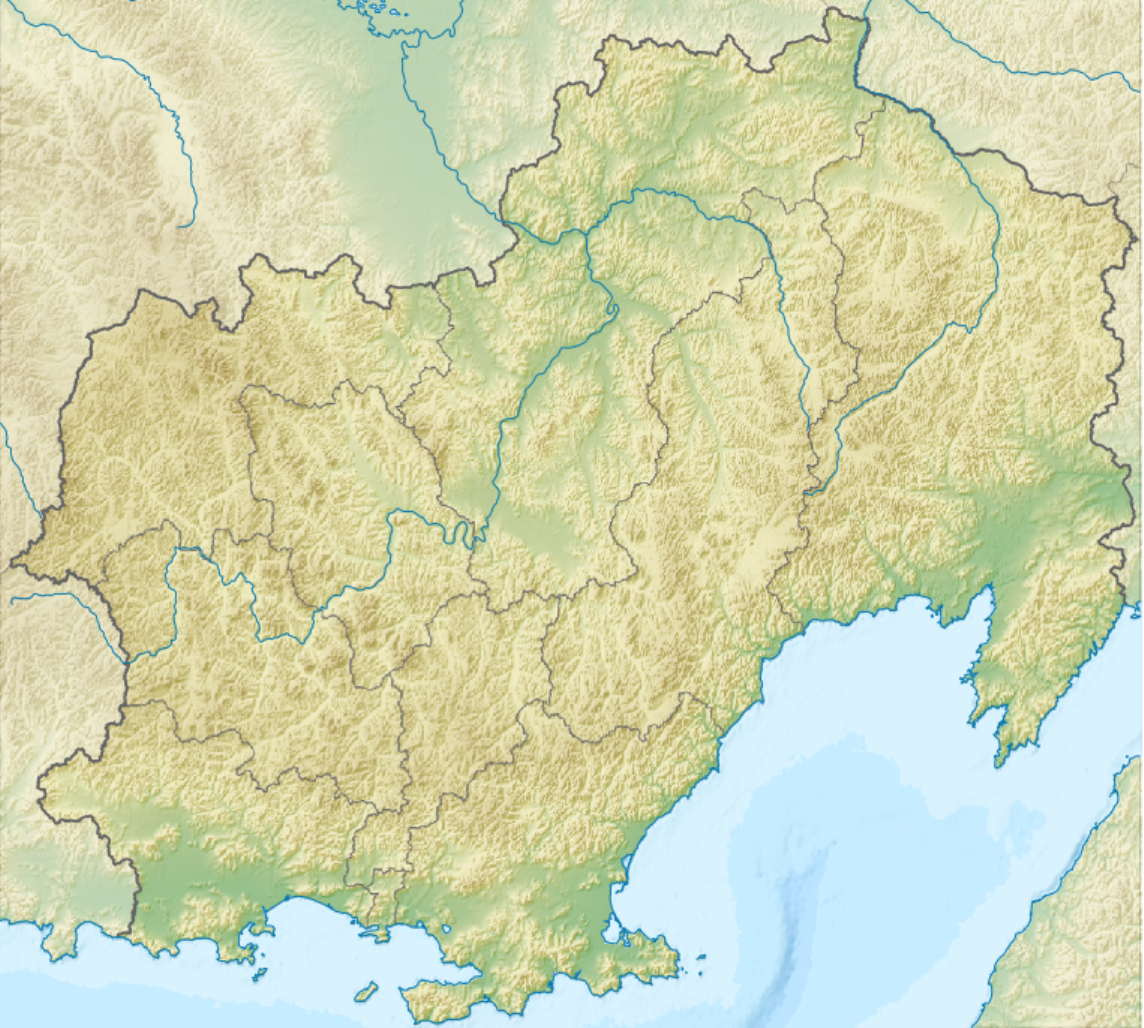
- Mouth location in Magadan Oblast, Russia

Physical characteristics
- Source: Confluence of rivers Khujakh and Kenelichi
  - location: Suntar-Khayata, Khabarovsk Krai
  - coordinates: 61°52′23″N 144°33′40″E
- Mouth: Kolyma river
  - location: Tenkinsky District, Magadan Oblast, Russia
  - coordinates: 62°17′40″N 147°43′55″E
- Length: 300 kilometres (190 mi)
- Basin size: 15,600 square kilometres (6,000 sq mi)
- Discharge
  - average: 140 m^{3}/s (4,900 cu ft/s)

Basin features
- Progression: Kolyma→ East Siberian Sea

The Kulu (Russian: Кулу) is a river in Khabarovsk Krai and Magadan Oblast, Russia. It is a right tributary of the Kolyma river, which forms at the confluence of the Kulu and the Ayan-Yuryakh.

The name of the river originated in the Chukchi word kuul — meaning "deep river".

The Kulu flows through desolate territory; the only settlement by the river is Kulu, a village which had a population of 1,345 inhabitants in 1977, but which was abolished in 2008. In 2017 it was revived by two families who resettled the abandoned village and established a farm. There were 56 inhabitants in 2021.

== Course ==
The source of the river is in the eastern part of the Suntar Khayata Range, in Khabarovsk Krai. The river flows roughly northeastwards across mountainous terrain, then it bends southwards and describes a wide arch northwards. In its lower course the Kulu flows through the Upper Kolyma Highlands. It divides into branches across a floodplain and finally it meets the Ayan-Yuryakh forming the Kolyma.

The Kulu is fed by rain and snow. The river freezes in October and thaws at the end of May. Floods are common in the summer and early autumn. Its main tributaries are the Kenyelichi and Hinike from the right; and the Khujakh, Neryuchi and Arga-Yuryakh from the left. There are more than 800 lakes in the Kulu basin.

== See also ==
- Byoryolyokh
- List of rivers of Russia
