= Balygychan =

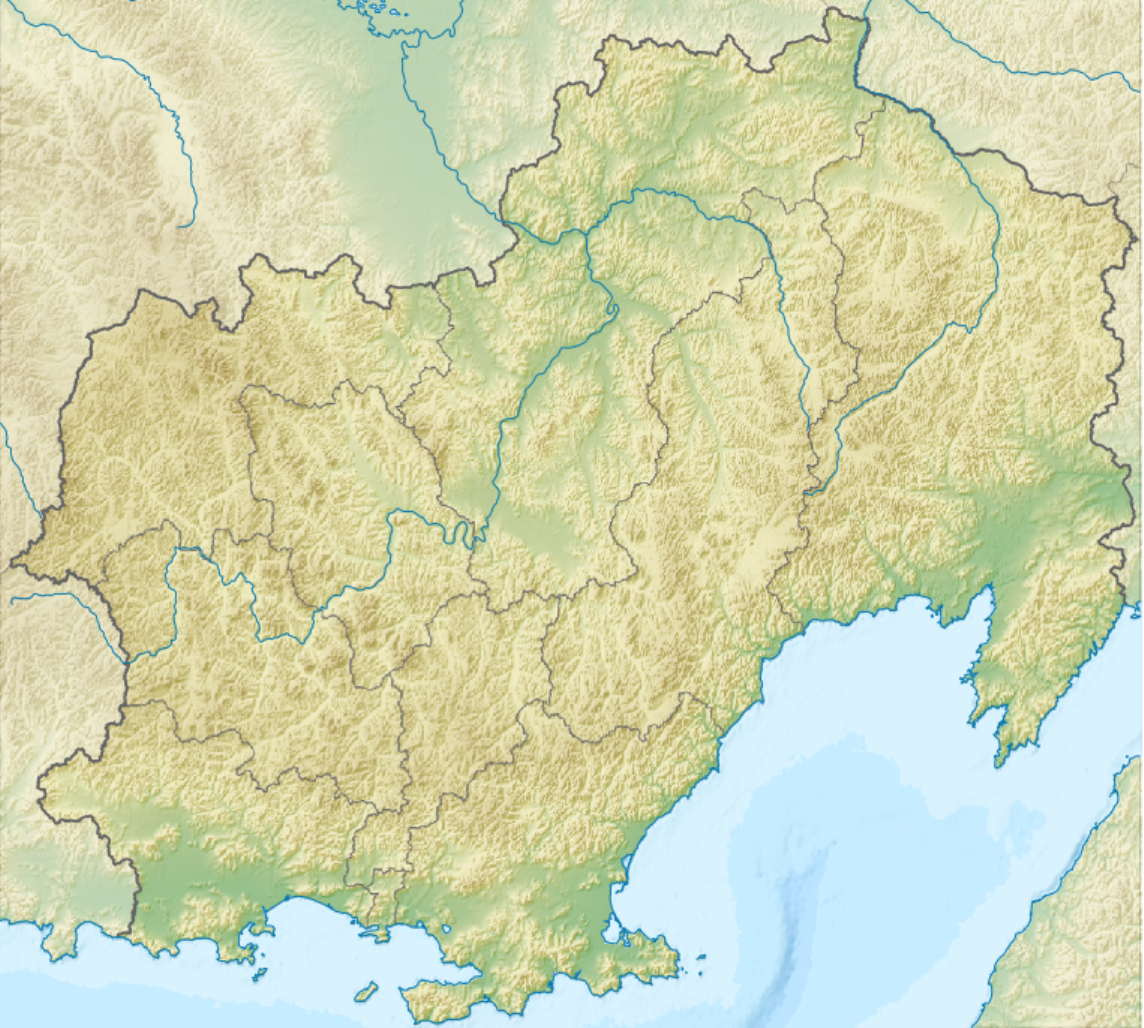
- Mouth location in Magadan Oblast, Russia
- Native name: Балыгычан

Location
- Country: Magadan Oblast, Russia

Physical characteristics
- Source
  - location: Hal-Urekchen, Kolyma Mountains
  - coordinates: 61°41′36″N 155°26′48″E
- Mouth: Kolyma
  - coordinates: 63°59′13″N 154°14′40″E
  - elevation: 126 m (413 ft)
- Length: 400 km (250 mi)
- Basin size: 17,600 km^{2} (6,800 sq mi)

Basin features
- Progression: Kolyma→ East Siberian Sea

The Balygychan (Russian: Балыгычан) is a river in Magadan Oblast, Russian Far East. It is 352 kilometres (219 mi) long (400 km including Levy Balygychan), with a drainage basin of 17,600 square kilometres (6,800 mi^{2}).

The river freezes in October and stays frozen until the end of May. Graylings, longnose suckers, pikes and whitefish are common in the Balygychan waters.

== Course ==
The river has its source in the Hal-Urekchen, at the confluence of the Left Balygychan and Right Balygychan rivers of the Kolyma Mountains. It flows roughly northwards along the western flank of the Omsukchan Range. In its middle course there is the abandoned town of Verkhny Balygychan ("Upper Balygychan"). North of the town the Balygychan flows along a marshy intermontane basin where the river widens, meanders and divides in arms. Finally it joins the right bank of the Kolyma 1,353 km (841 mi) from its mouth.

The main tributaries of the Balygychan are the Kyrchan and the Dzhagyn, both joining it from the right. The town of Balygychan lies on the right bank of the Kolyma, just a little upstream from the confluence. There are more than 300 lakes in the basin of the river. It is about 400 km (250 mi) long from the source of the Left Balygychan to the confluence with the Kolyma.

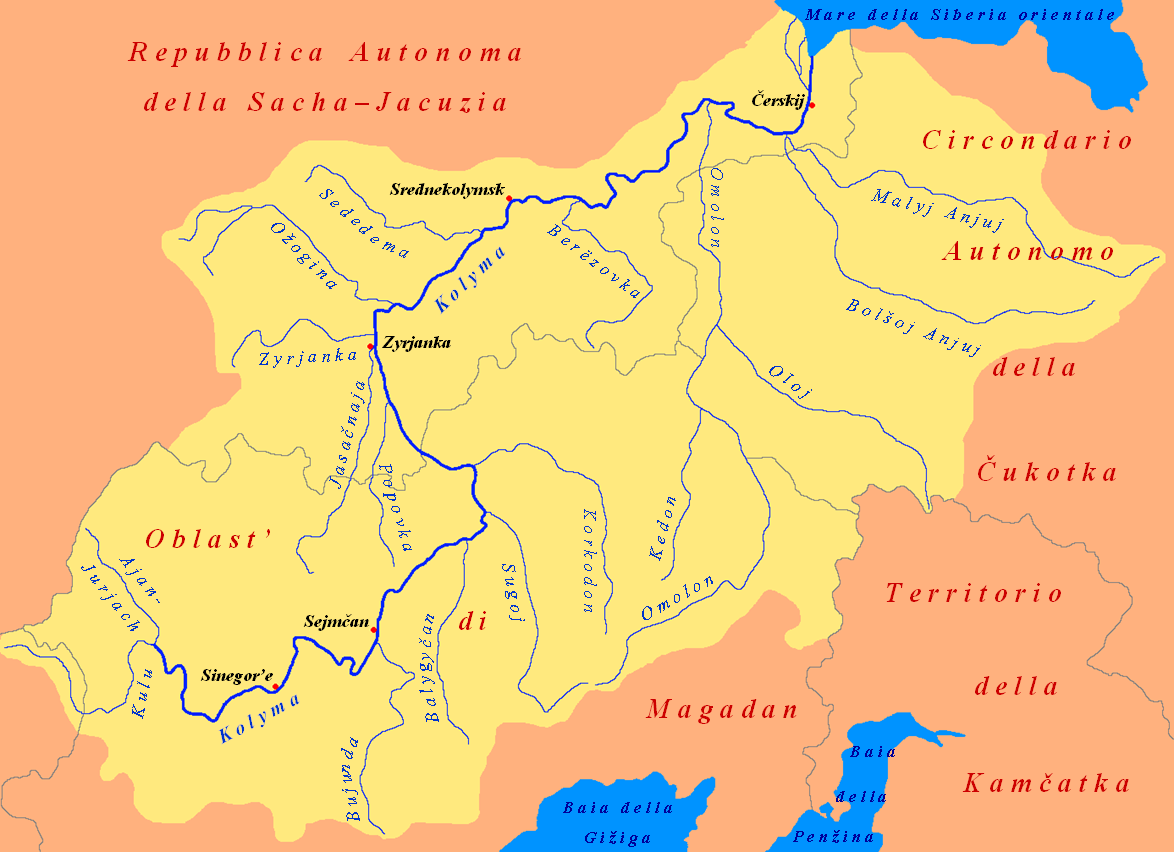
Kolyma basin map with river Balygychan in the middle. (in Italian)

== See also ==
- List of rivers of Russia
