= Ozhogina =

Ozhogina Yakut: Одьуогун
- Location in the Sakha Republic, Russia

Location
- Country: Russia

Physical characteristics
- Source
  - location: confluence of Sulakkan and Delkyu
  - elevation: 109 m (358 ft)
- Mouth: Kolyma
  - coordinates: 66°13′10″N 151°05′24″E
  - elevation: 21 m (69 ft)
- Length: 523 km (325 mi)
- Basin size: 24,300 square kilometres (9,400 sq mi)

The Ozhogina (Russian: Ожогина; Yakut: Одьуогун, Ocuogun) is a tributary of the Kolyma in eastern Siberia. The river is 523 kilometres (325 mi) long. The area of its basin is 24,300 square kilometres (9,400 mi^{2}).

== Course ==
It is formed by the confluence of two rivers: Sulakkan and Delkyu, which sources are located on the northern slopes of the Moma Range. It flows eastwards south of the Alazeya Plateau. The river is winding, there are more than 2,800 lakes in its basin. The river valley is covered with sparse larch taiga. It is covered with ice in October. The ice breaks up in May. The river is fed by snow and rain. The major tributaries are Chyocholyugyun and Khoska.
