= Tenka (river) =

Tenka Тенька
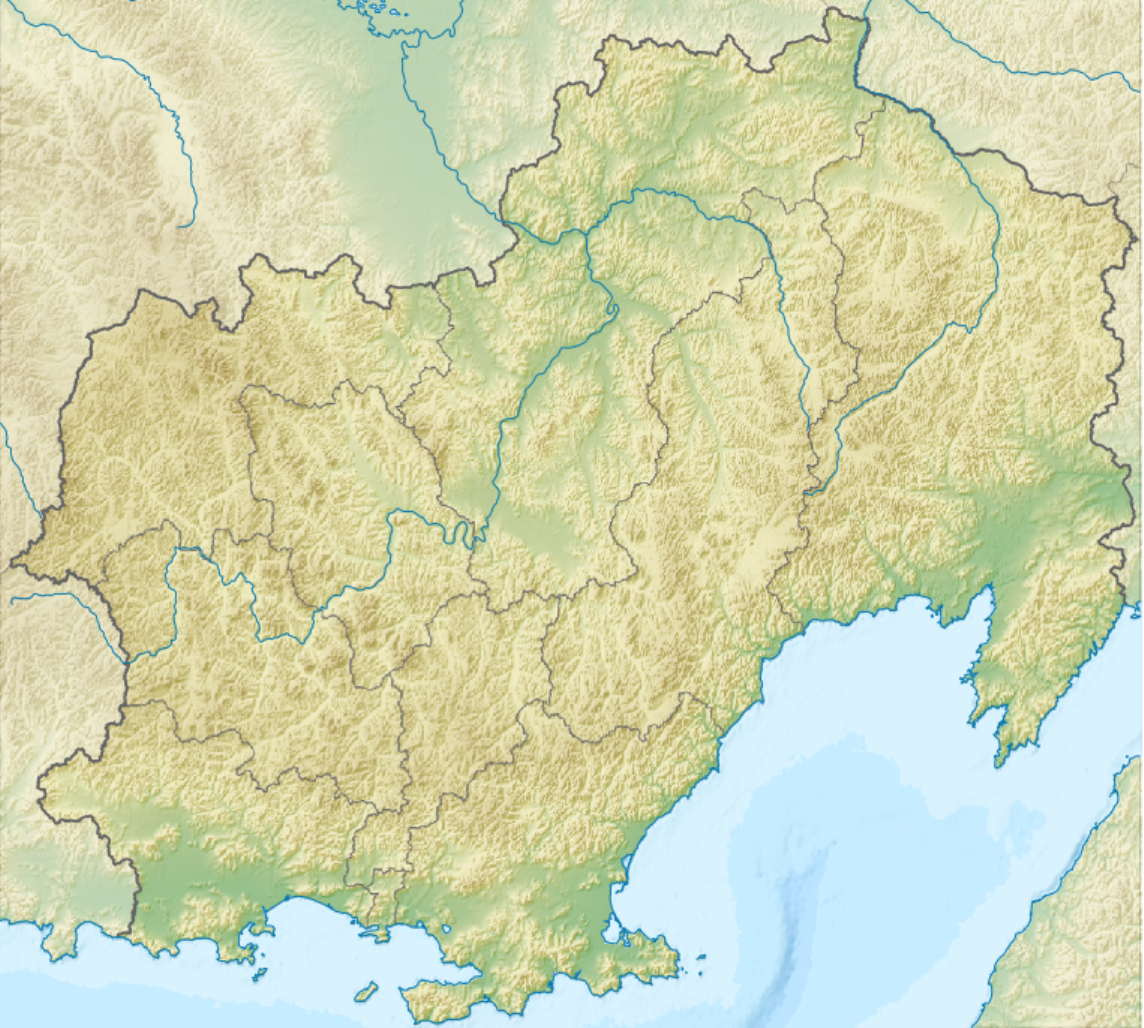
- Mouth location in Magadan Oblast, Russia

Location
- Country: Magadan Oblast, Russia

Physical characteristics
- Source
  - coordinates: 61°06′28″N 148°0′55″E
  - elevation: 844 m (2,769 ft)
- Mouth: Kolyma
  - coordinates: 61°36′06″N 148°50′54″E
  - elevation: 448 m (1,470 ft)
- Length: 136 km (85 mi)
- Basin size: 4,570 km^{2} (1,760 sq mi)

Basin features
- Progression: Kolyma→ East Siberian Sea

The Tenka (Russian: Тенька), also known as Tenke, is a river in Magadan Oblast, Russian Far East. It is a right tributary of the Kolyma, with a length of 136 kilometres (85 mi) a drainage basin of 4,570 square kilometres (1,760 mi^{2}). The river flows across the Tenkinsky District, which is named after it.

== Course ==
The Tenka flows through the Upper Kolyma Highlands. It heads first roughly northwards, then when it is joined by the Omchak from the left it flows southeastwards, passing near Transportny. Further downstream it bends again and flows northwards until its mouth. Formerly the river joined the right bank of the Kolyma 1,985 km (1,233 mi) from its mouth, but nowadays its mouth is in the Kolyma Reservoir at an elevation of 448 m (1,470 ft).

The main tributaries of the Tenka are the 24 km (15 mi) long Budyonny (Будённого) from the right; and the 57 km (35 mi) long Omchak and 84 km (52 mi) long Nilkoba joining it from the left.

== See also ==
- List of rivers of Russia
