= Sugoy =

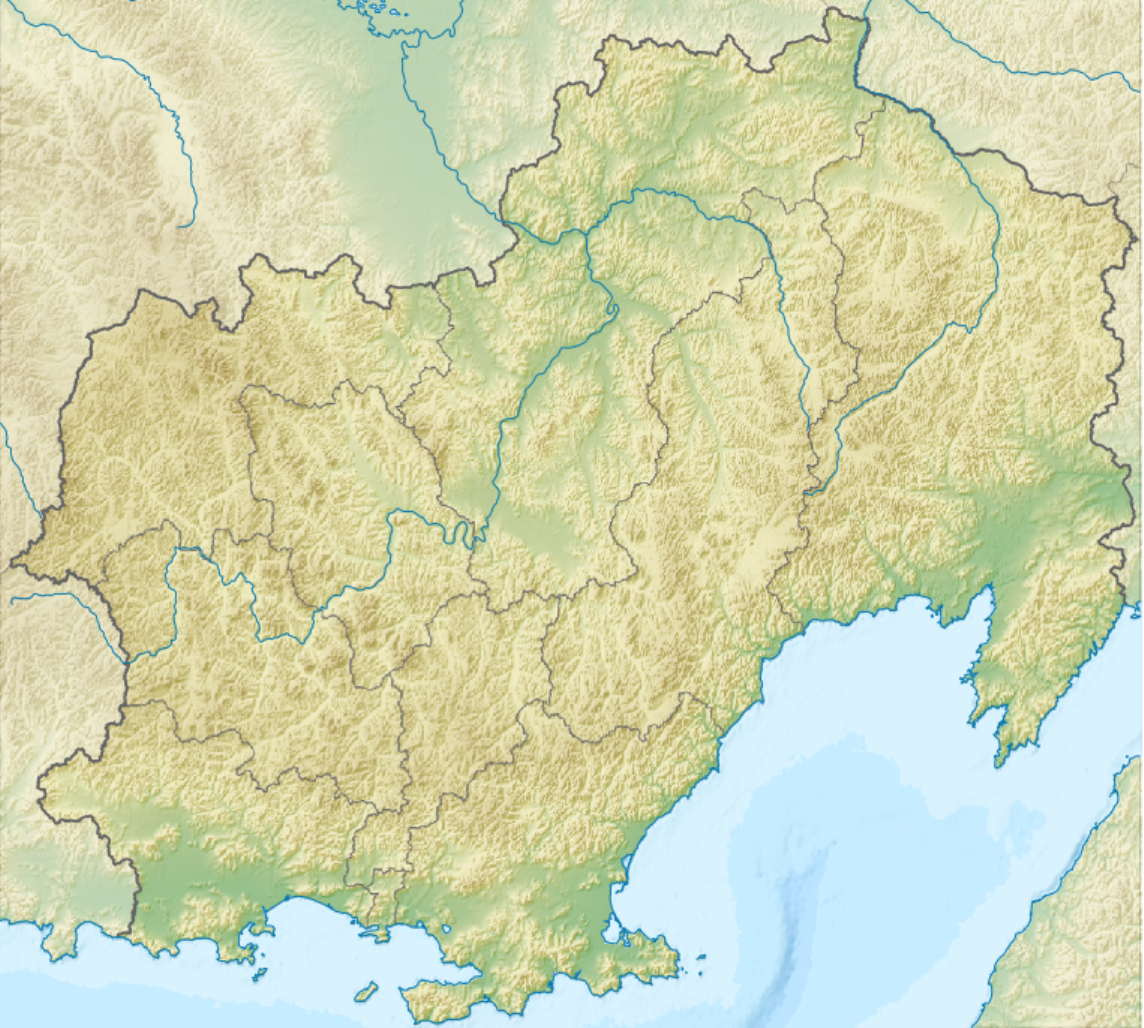
- Mouth location in Magadan Oblast, Russia
- Native name: Сугой

Location
- Country: Magadan Oblast, Russia

Physical characteristics
- Source
  - location: Kolyma Highlands
  - coordinates: 62°13′7″N 156°15′51″E
  - elevation: 515 m (1,690 ft)
- Mouth: Kolyma
  - coordinates: 64°15′8″N 154°29′28″E
- Length: 347 km (216 mi)
- Basin size: 26,100 km^{2} (10,100 sq mi)

Basin features
- Progression: Kolyma→ East Siberian Sea

The Sugoy (Russian: Сугой) is a river in Magadan Oblast, Russian Far East. It is 347 kilometres (216 mi) long, with a drainage basin of 26,100 square kilometres (10,100 mi^{2}).

The river freezes in October and stays frozen until late May or early June. There are important coal deposits in the Sugoy basin.

== Course ==
The river has its source in the confluence of two small rivers of the Kolyma Highlands at an elevation of 515 metres (1,690 ft) and flows roughly westwards in its upper course. After a sharp bend it flows northwards along the eastern flank of the Omsukchan Range. North of Omsukchan town the intermontane basin where the river flows is up to 1.2 kilometres (0.75 mi) wide and includes extensive wetland areas, as well as dense forests. Finally it joins the right bank of the Kolyma 1,300 km (810 mi) from its mouth.

The main tributary of the Sugoy is the Khetagchan (Хетагчан) that joins it in its lower course from the right.

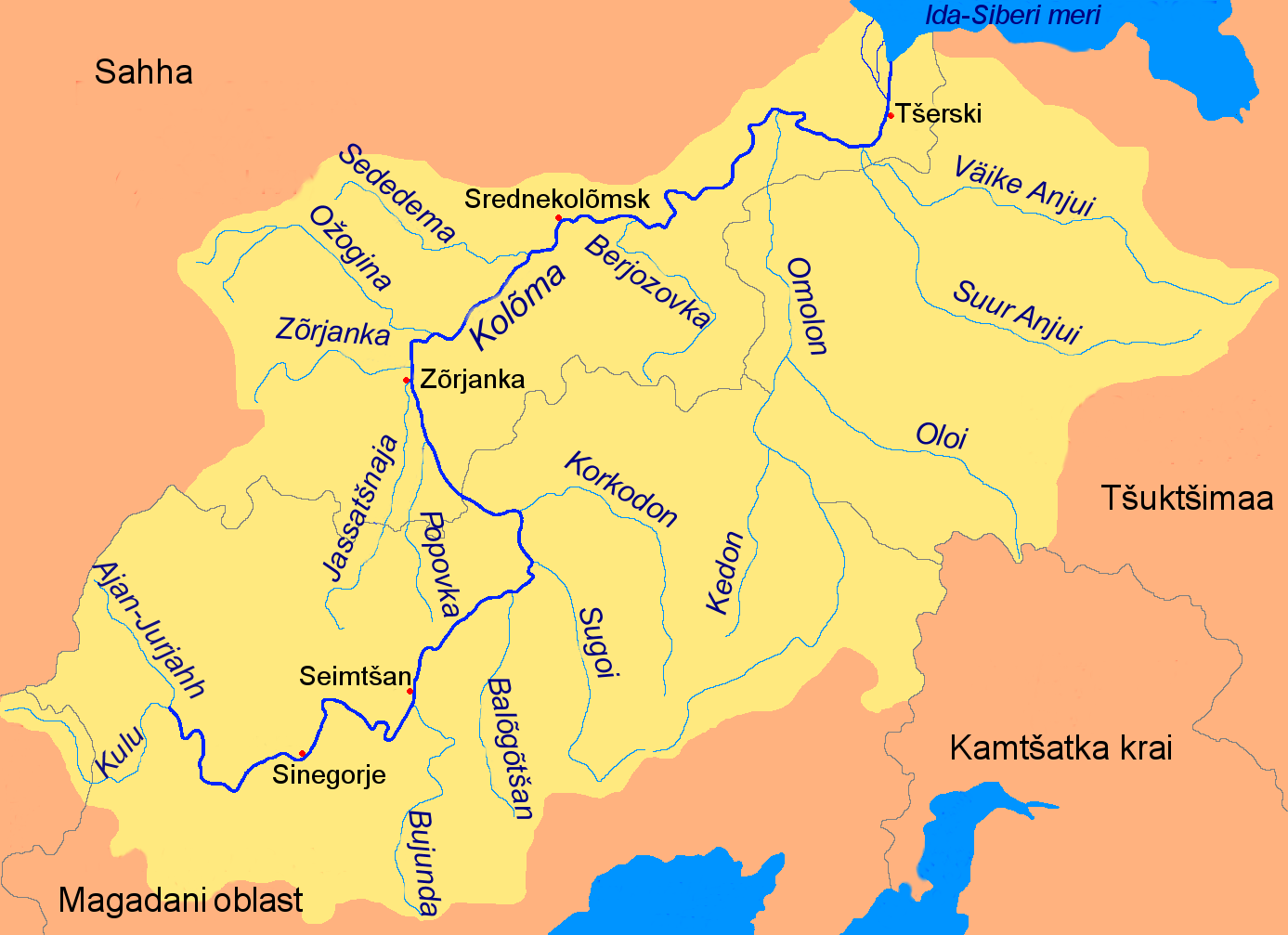
Kolyma basin map with river Sugoy in the middle. (in Estonian)

== See also ==
- List of rivers of Russia
