= Popovka (Kolyma) =

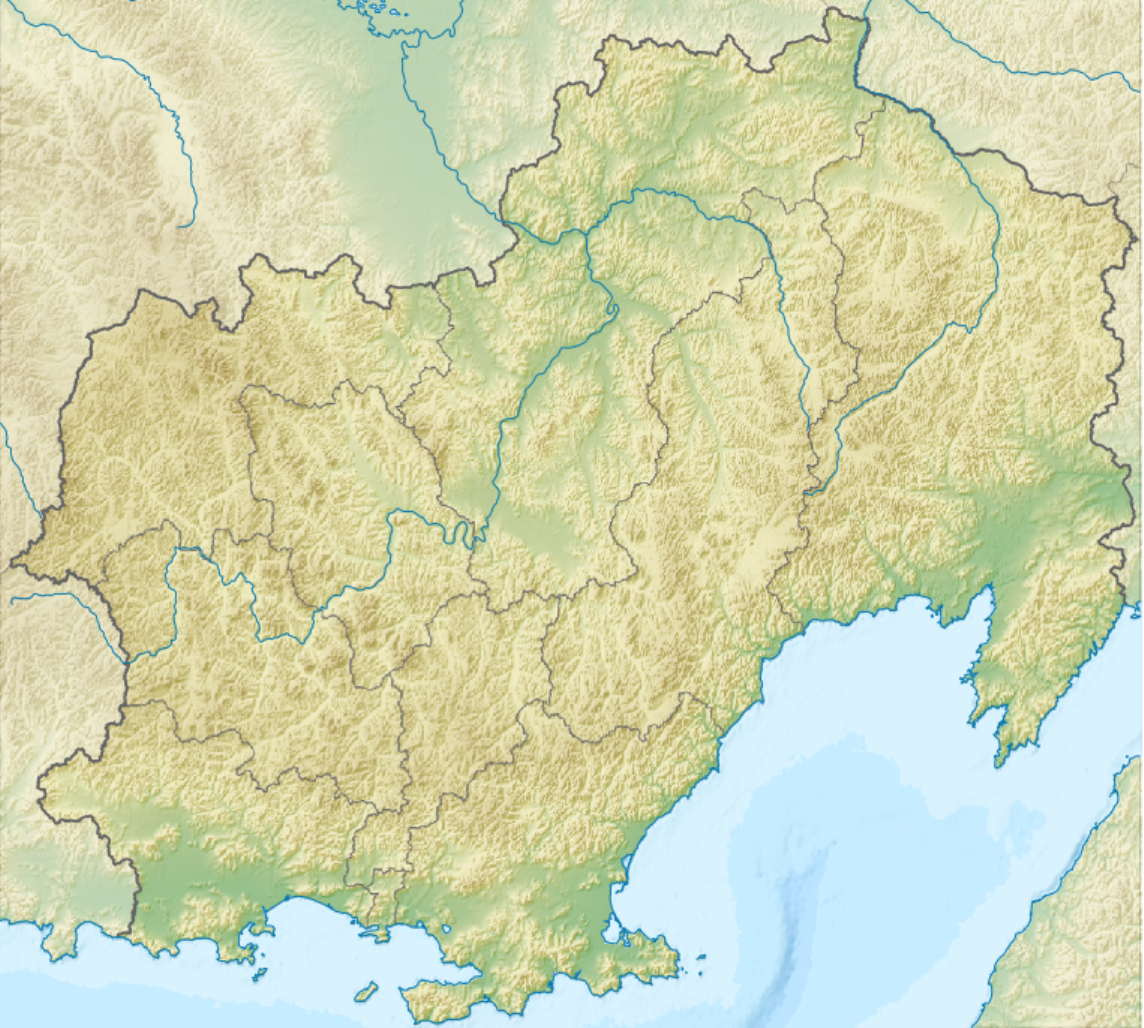
- Mouth location in Magadan Oblast, Russia

Location
- Country: Russia

Physical characteristics
- Source: Polyarny Range
  - coordinates: 63°32′23″N 152°44′20″E
- Mouth: Kolyma
  - coordinates: 65°12′44″N 151°38′18″E
- Length: 356 km (221 mi)
- Basin size: 8,350 km^{2} (3,220 sq mi)

Basin features
- Progression: Kolyma→ East Siberian Sea

The Popovka (Russian: Поповка) is a river in Yakutia and Magadan regions, a left tributary of the Kolyma. It is 356 kilometres (221 mi) long, and has a drainage basin of 8,350 square kilometres (3,220 sq mi).

== See also ==
- List of rivers of Russia
