= Sededema =

Sededema Седедема / Сэдэдэмэ
- Mouth location in Yakutia, Russia

Location
- Country: Russia

Physical characteristics
- Source
  - location: Alazeya Plateau
- Mouth: Kolyma
  - coordinates: 67.0938°N 153.0278°E
- Length: 567 km (352 mi)
- Basin size: 18,500 km^{2} (7,100 sq mi)

Basin features
- Progression: Kolyma→ East Siberian Sea

The Sededema (Russian: Седедема; Yakut: Сэдэдэмэ, Sededeme) is a river in Sakha Republic, Russia. It is a left tributary of the Kolyma. It is 567 kilometres (352 mi) long, and has a drainage basin of 18,500 square kilometres (7,100 sq mi).

== See also ==
- List of rivers of Russia
