= Ust-Srednekan Hydroelectric Plant =

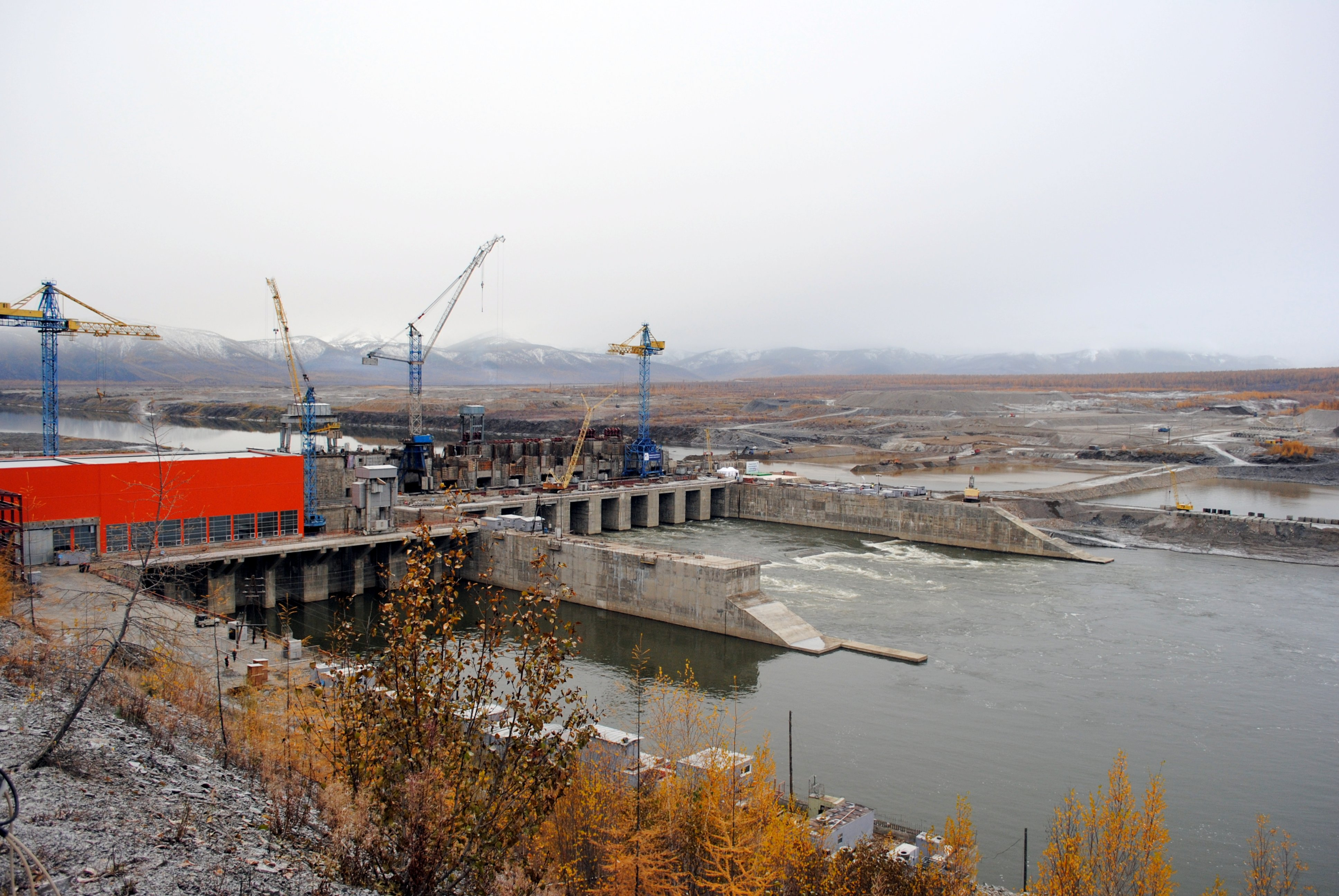
- Building of the dam in 2011

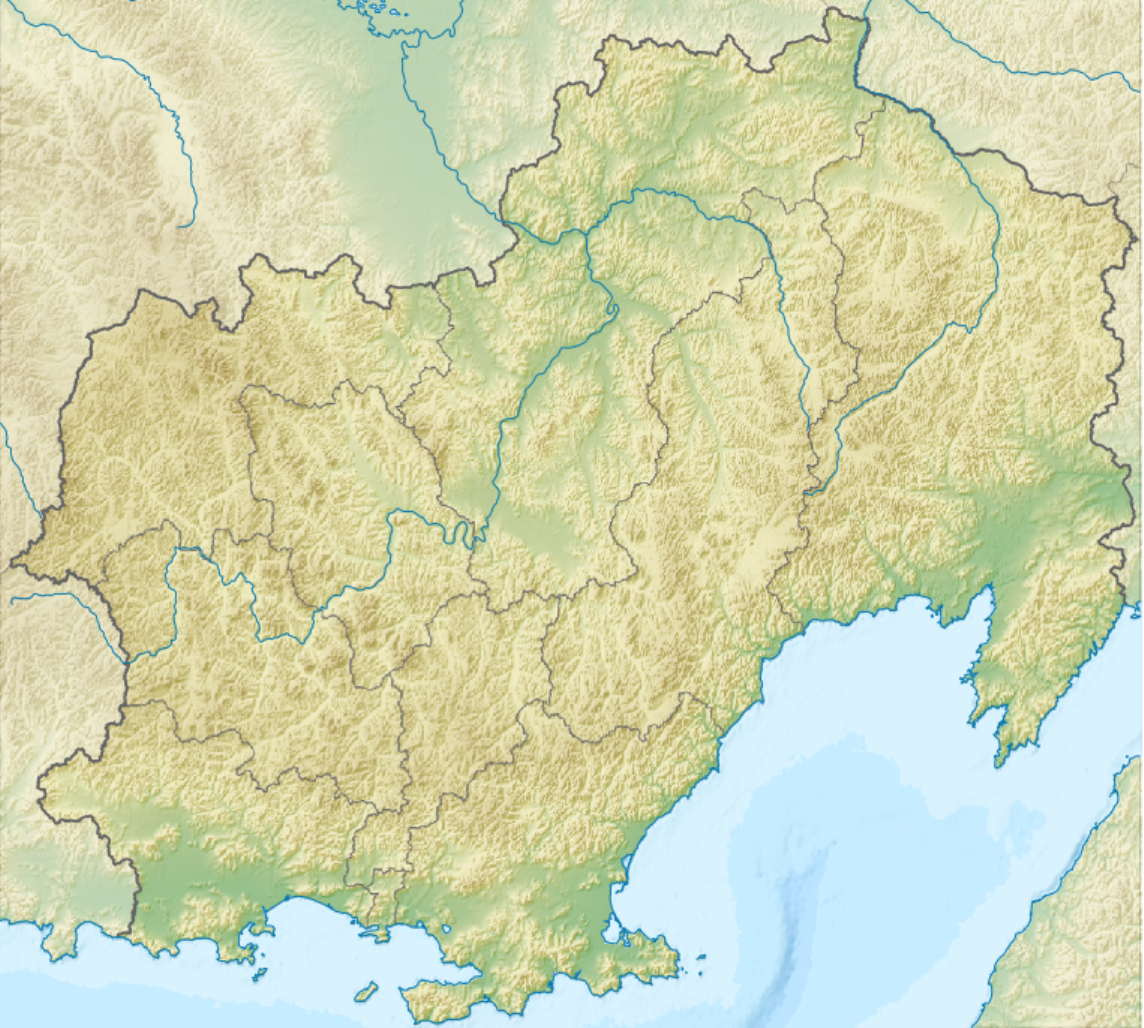
- Location within Magadan Oblast Location within Russia
- Official name: Усть-Среднеканская ГЭС
- Country: Russia
- Location: Ust-Srednekan, Srednekansky District, Magadan Oblast
- Coordinates: 62°25′04″N 152°09′09″E
- Purpose: Power
- Status: Under construction
- Construction began: 1991
- Opening date: 2022; 4 years ago
- Owner: RusHydro

Dam and spillways
- Type of dam: Earth, concrete
- Impounds: Kolyma River
- Height: 74 m (243 ft)
- Length: 2,490 m (8,170 ft)

Power Station
- Operator: RusHydro
- Type: Conventional

Ust-Srednekan Hydroelectric Plant is a hydroelectric power station located on the Kolyma River near the village of Ust-Srednekan, Srednekansky District, Magadan Oblast Russia. It has an installed power generation capacity of 570 MW.

The dam is located 217 km (135 mi) downstream from the larger Kolyma Hydroelectric Station.

== History ==
Following the completion of the Kolyma Hydroelectric Station in 1978, the site of the future Ust-Srednekan Hydroelectric Plant was inspected by Lenhydroproject engineers. A feasibility study was approved in 1989 by the USSR Ministry of Energy and Electrification. Preliminary construction work at the site of the hydroelectric complex began in 1990 and initially made rapid progress. The first phase included the construction of a road to Ust-Srednekan as well as the layout of a foundation. In 1992 the lintels of the foundation pit of the main structures were filled, and a temporary concrete plant was put into operation. In 1993 the first cubic meter of concrete at the construction of the hydroelectric power station was laid and a bridge across the Kolyma was built in order to provide a connection with the construction site on the opposite bank. In 1996 the first tower crane as well as the second stage of a temporary concrete plant and a 110/35/6 Kw substation were put into operation. In 1999 began the installation of hydraulic power equipment. All along the 1990s decade construction was hampered owing to insufficient funding.

== See also ==
- Kolyma Reservoir
