= Okhandya Range =

Mountain range in Russia

- Охандя
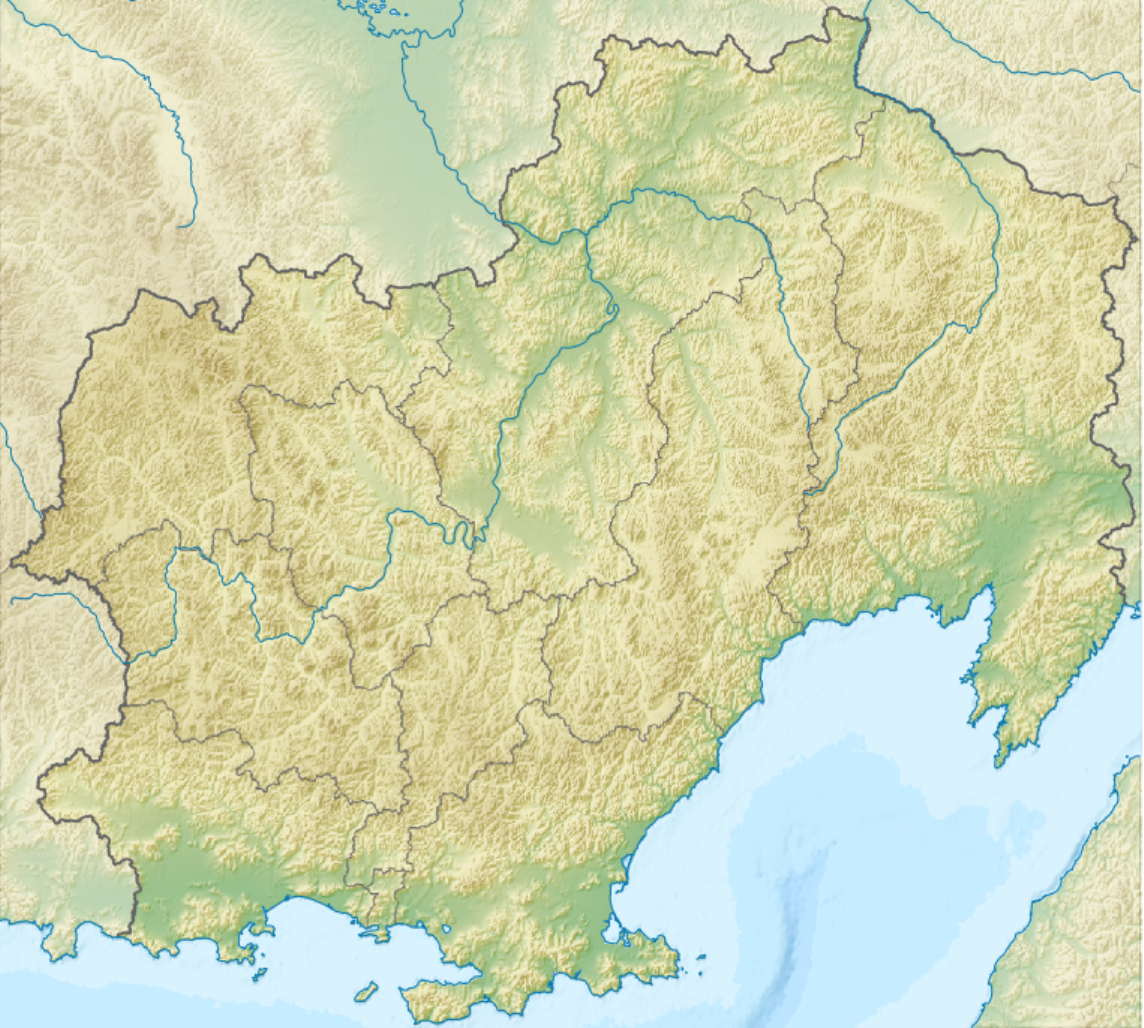
- Location within Magadan Oblast

Highest point
- Peak: Unnamed
- Elevation: 2,337 m (7,667 ft)
- Coordinates: 63°38′29″N 147°50′37″E

Dimensions
- Length: 80 km (50 mi) NW/SE
- Width: 30 km (19 mi) NE/SW

Geography
- Country: Russia
- Federal subject: Magadan Oblast
- Range coordinates: 63°30′N 147°45′E
- Parent range: Chersky Range, East Siberian System

Climbing
- Easiest route: From Susuman

The Okhandya Range (Russian: Охандя or Оханджа) is a mountain range in Magadan Oblast, Far Eastern Federal District, Russia. The nearest airfield is Susuman Airport.

The name of the range originated in the Even language.

== Geography ==
The Okhandya Range rises in the southeastern area of the Chersky Range, to the north of the Upper Kolyma Highlands and east of the valley of the Byoryolyokh, the main tributary of the Ayan-Yuryakh.

The Okhandya Range stretches in a roughly northwest–southeast direction for about 80 kilometers (50 mi) from the source of the Bolshoi Maldyak River near 1,844 metres (6,050 ft) high Mount Nenkat in the north, to the mouth of the Okhandya River in Lake Malyk at the southern limit. The highest peak is a 2,337 metres (7,667 ft) high unnamed peak, the highest point of Magadan Oblast. The range has also two other high peaks reaching 2,253 metres (7,392 ft) and 2,243 metres (7,359 ft) that are also unnamed. At the southeastern end of the Okhandya Range the Cherge Range, another subrange of the Chersky Mountains, stretches southeastwards in the same direction.

Rivers Omulyovka, Byoryolyokh and Okhandya have their sources in the range. Lake Momontai (Озеро Момонтай) is located to the east of the eastern slopes of the Okhandya Range.

== See also ==
- Highest points of Russian Federal subjects
- List of mountains and hills of Russia
