= Zyryanka (river) =

River in Russia

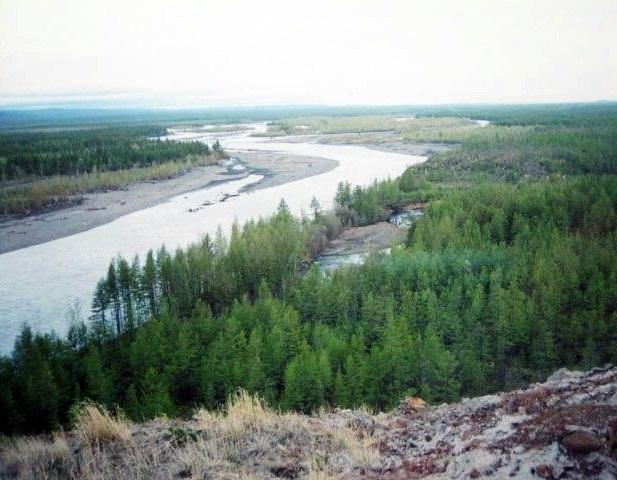

- Location within Sakha Republic Location within Russia Location within Asia
- Native name: Зырянка (Russian)

Physical characteristics
- Source
  - coordinates: 65.206785°N 147.722890°E
- Mouth: Kolyma
  - coordinates: 65.823613°N 150.775935°E
- Length: 299 km (186 mi)
- Basin size: 7,310 km^{2} (2,820 sq mi)

Basin features
- Progression: Kolyma→ East Siberian Sea

The Zyryanka (Russian: Зырянка) is a river in Yakutia, Russia. It is a left tributary of the Kolyma. It is 299 kilometres (186 mi) long, and has a drainage basin of 7,310 square kilometres (2,820 sq mi).

== See also ==
- List of rivers of Russia
