= Ayan-Yuryakh =

Siberian river

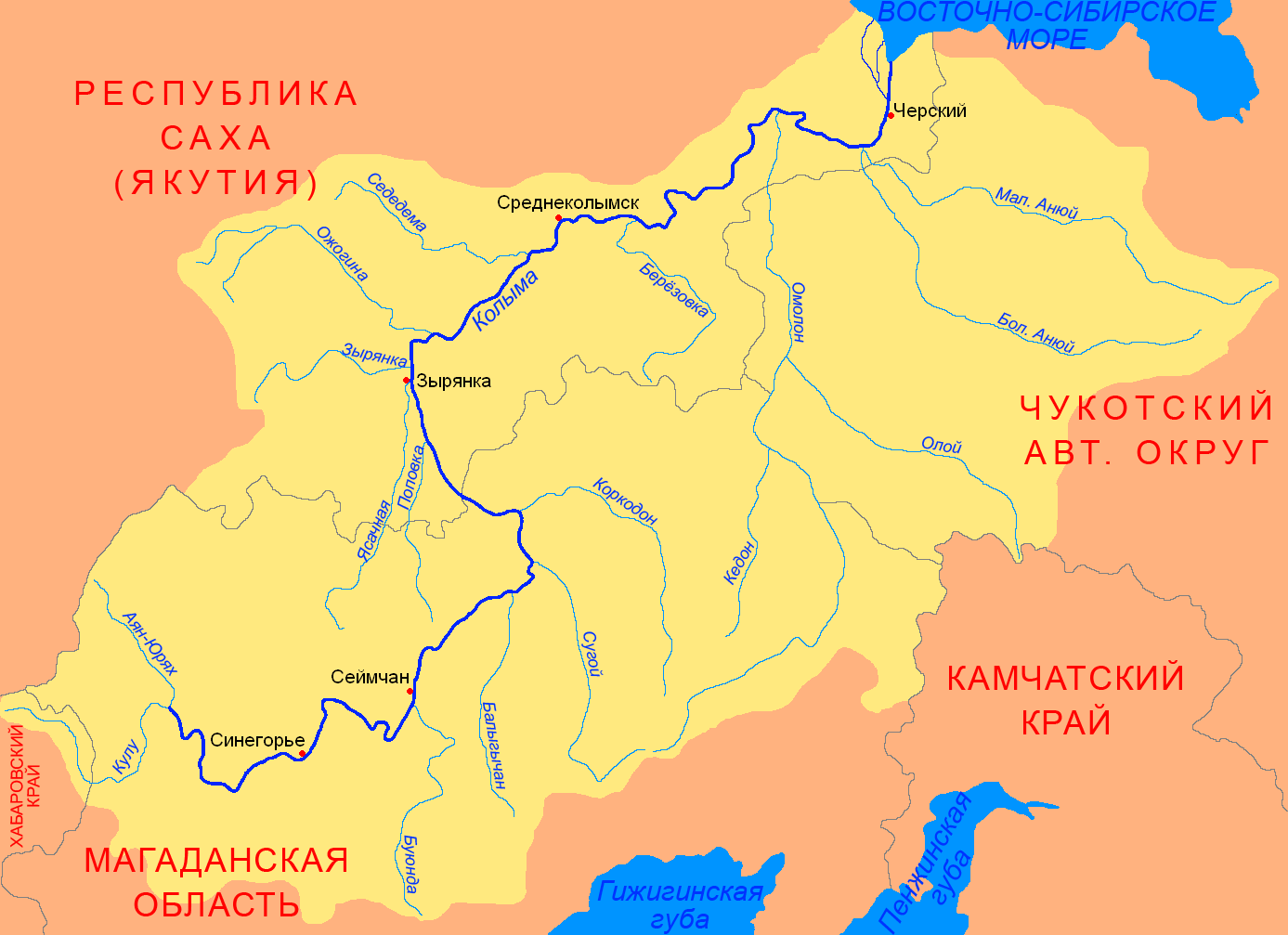
- The Ayan-Yuryakh is located near the southwest corner of the Kolyma river basin

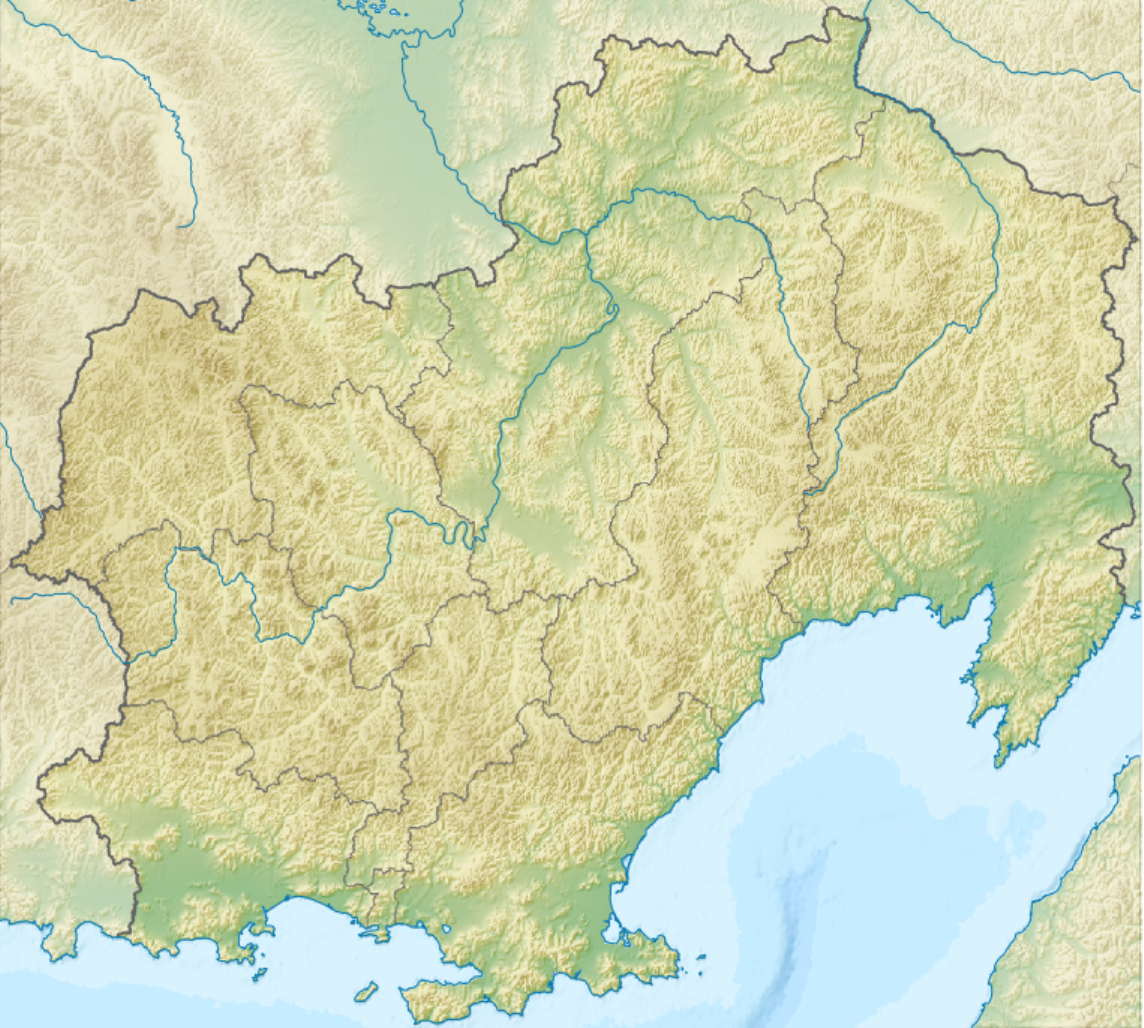
- Mouth location in Magadan Oblast, Russia
- Native name: Аян-Юрях (Russian)

Physical characteristics
- Source: Khalkan Range
  - location: Susumansky District, Magadan Oblast, Russia
  - coordinates: 62.91°N 146.13°E
  - elevation: 992 metres (3,255 ft)
- Mouth: Kolyma river
  - location: Tenkinsky District, Magadan Oblast, Russia
  - coordinates: 62°17′40″N 147°43′55″E
  - elevation: 519 metres (1,703 ft)
- Length: 237 kilometres (147 mi)
- Basin size: 24,100 square kilometres (9,300 sq mi)

Basin features
- Progression: Kolyma→ East Siberian Sea

The Ayan-Yuryakh is a river in the Magadan Oblast of Russia. It is a left tributary of the Kolyma river, which forms at the confluence of the Ayan-Yuryakh and the Kulu.

== Course ==
The source of the river is in the Khalkan Range. The river flows across the Upper Kolyma Highlands and is fed primarily by rain and snow.

Its main tributary is the 239 km (149 mi) long Byoryolyokh from the right.

== See also ==
- Belichan
- List of rivers of Russia
- Nera Plateau
