= Kolyma (river) =

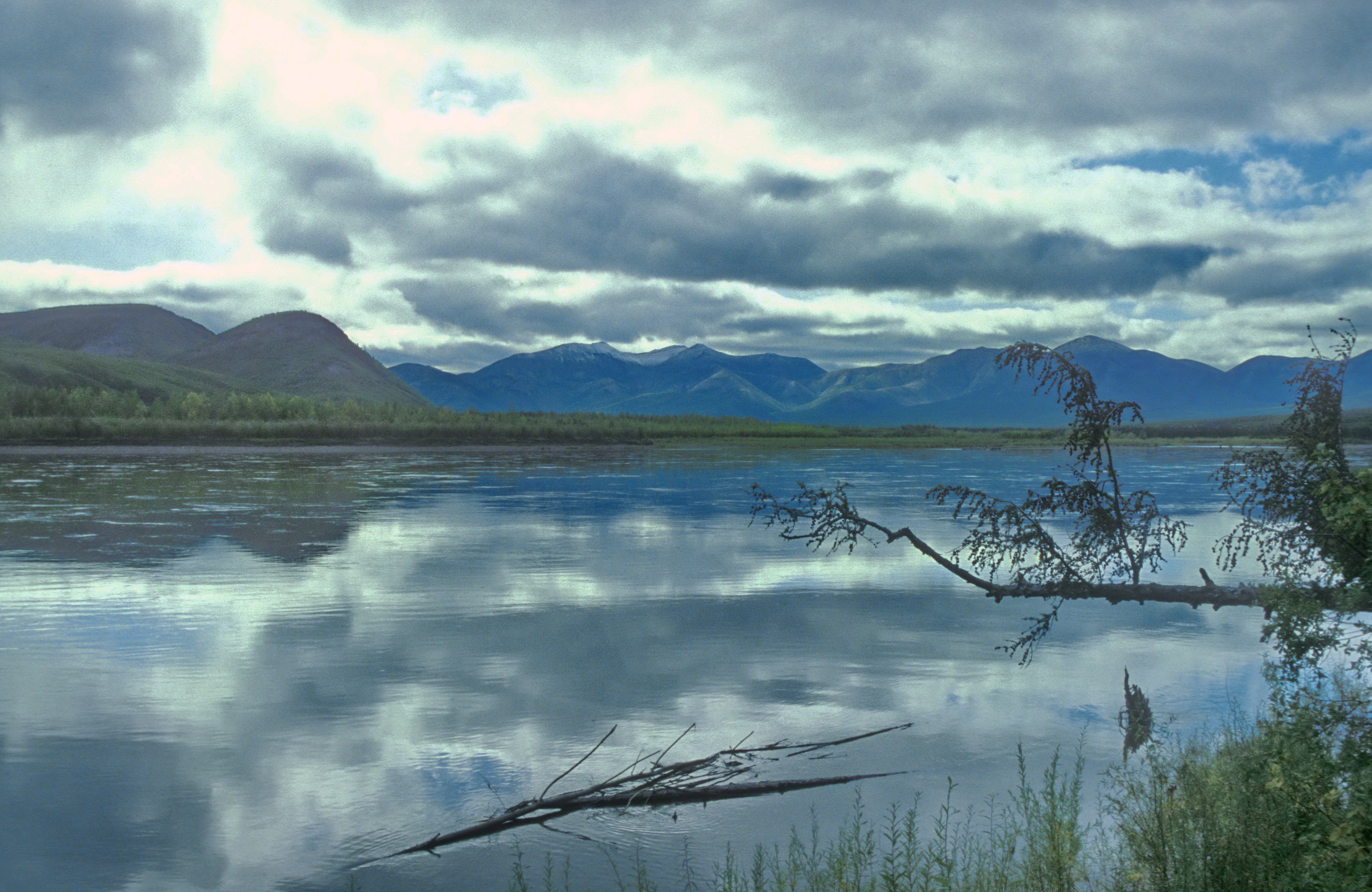

- Location of the river mouth in the Far Eastern Federal District, Russia
- Etymology: Tundra Yukaghir kulumaa, "river"
- Native name: Колыма (Russian)

Location
- Country: Russia

Physical characteristics
- Source: Kulu
  - location: Okhotsky District, Khabarovsk Krai
  - coordinates: 61°55′05″N 144°36′11″E
  - elevation: 1,426 m (4,678 ft)
- 2nd source: Ayan-Yuryakh
  - location: Susumansky District, Magadan Oblast
  - coordinates: 62°54′36″N 146°07′48″E
  - elevation: 992 m (3,255 ft)
- Mouth: East Siberian Sea
  - location: Kolyma Gulf
  - coordinates: 69°32′52″N 161°21′51″E
  - elevation: 0 m (0 ft)
- Length: 2,129 km (1,323 mi)
- Basin size: 647,000 km^{2} (250,000 mi^{2})
- Discharge
  - location: Kolyma Delta, East Siberian Sea, Russia
  - average: (Period: 1984–2018)130 km^{3}/a (4,100 m^{3}/s) 4,190 m^{3}/s (148,000 cu ft/s)
- Discharge
  - location: Kolymskoye (Basin size: 526,000 km^{2} (203,000 mi^{2}))
  - average: (Period of data: 1978–2000) 3,254 m^{3}/s (114,900 cu ft/s)
  - minimum: 30.6 m^{3}/s (1,080 cu ft/s) (in April 1979)
  - maximum: 26,201 m^{3}/s (925,300 cu ft/s) (in June 1985)

Basin features
- Tributaries
  - left: Popovka, Yasachnaya, Zyryanka, Ozhogina, Sededema
  - right: Buyunda, Balygychan, Sugoy, Korkodon, Beryozovka, Omolon, Anyuy

The Kolyma (Russian: Колыма, IPA: [kəlɨˈma]; Yakut: Халыма, romanized: Xalıma) is a river in northeastern Siberia, whose basin covers parts of the Sakha Republic, Chukotka Autonomous Okrug, and Magadan Oblast of Russia.

The Kolyma is frozen to depths of several metres for about 250 days each year, becoming free of ice only in early June, until October.

== Course ==
The Kolyma begins at the confluence of the Kulu and the Ayan-Yuryakh (the Kolyma a natural continuation of Ayan-Yuryakh). The confluence happens in the Okhotsk-Kolyma Upland (Охотско-Колымское нагорье), which lies within the watershed that separates the Kolyma basin and the basins of rivers flowing into the Sea of Okhotsk. Kolyma flows across the Upper Kolyma Highlands roughly southwards in its upper course. Leaving the mountainous areas it flows roughly northwards across the Kolyma Lowland, a vast plain dotted with thousands of lakes, part of the greater East Siberian Lowland. The river empties into the Kolyma Gulf of the East Siberian Sea, a division of the Arctic Ocean.

The Kolyma is 2,129 kilometres (1,323 mi) long. The area of its basin is 647,000 square kilometres (250,000 mi^{2}). The average discharge at Kolymskoye is 3,254 m^{3}/s (114,900 cu ft/s), with a high of 26,201 m^{3}/s (925,300 cu ft/s) reported in June 1985, and a low of 30.6 m^{3}/s (1,080 cu ft/s) in April 1979.

=== Tributaries ===
The main tributaries of the Kolyma are, from source to mouth:

- Ayan-Yuryakh (left)
- Kulu (right)
- Tenka (right)
- Buyunda (right)
- Bakhapcha (right)
- Seymchan (left)
- Balygychan (right)
- Sugoy (right)
- Korkodon (right)
  - Bulun
- Popovka (left)
- Yasachnaya (left)
- Zyryanka (left)
- Debin (left)
- Taskan (left)
- Ozhogina (left)
- Sededema (left)
- Beryozovka (right)
- Omolon (right)
  - Oloy
- Anyuy (right)
  - Bolshoy Anyuy
  - Maly Anyuy

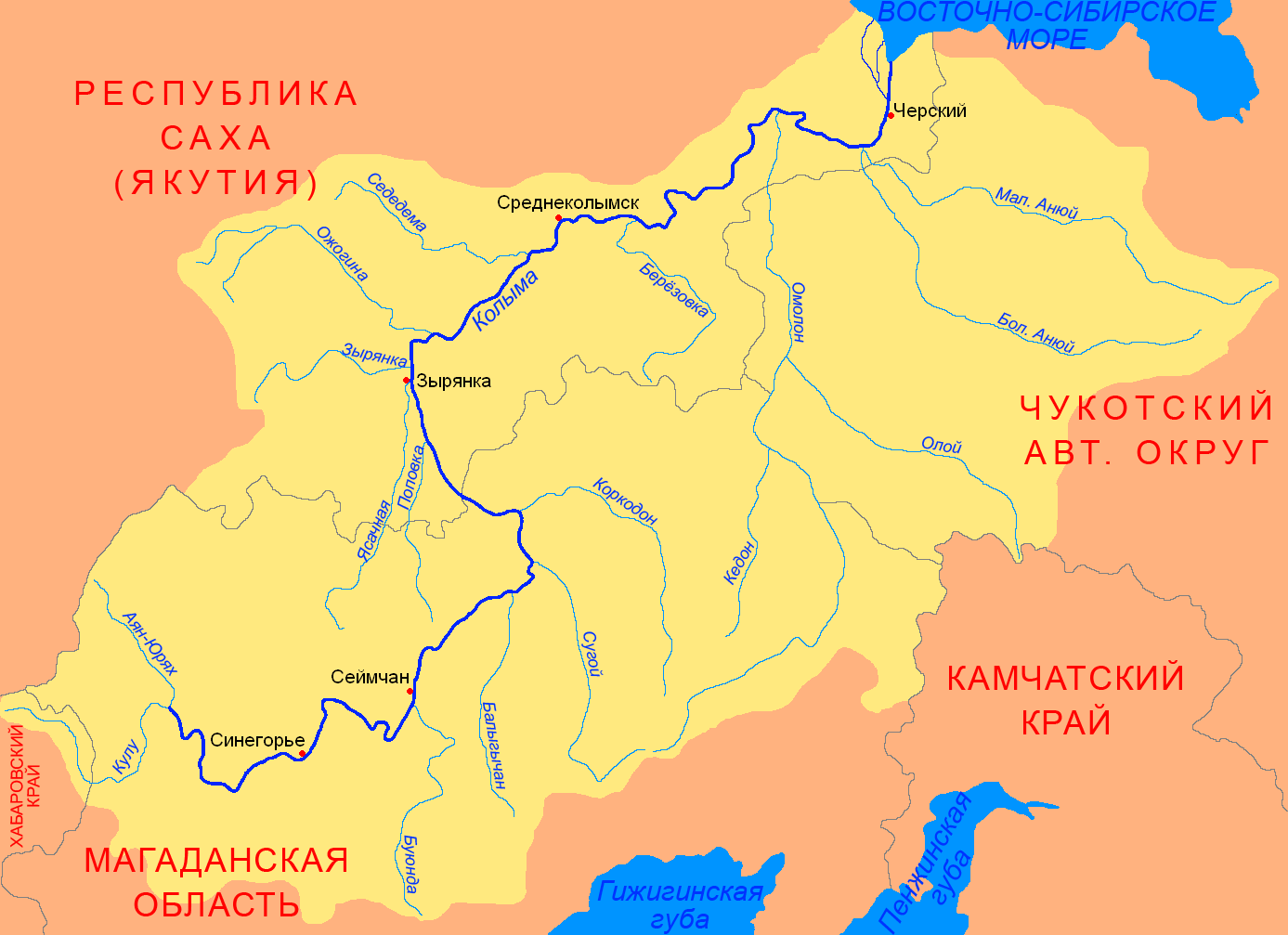

=== Islands ===
In the last 75-kilometre (47 mi) stretch, the Kolyma divides into two large branches. There are many islands at the mouth of the Kolyma before it meets the East Siberian sea. The main ones are:

- Mikhalkino 69.416°N 161.255°E is the largest island, it lies to the west of the Kolyma's eastern branch, the Kamennaya Kolyma anabranch. This island breaks up into smaller islands on its northern end. It is 24 kilometres (15 mi) long and 6 kilometres (4 mi) wide. Mikhalkino is also known as "Glavsevmorput Island" after the Chief Directorate of the Northern Sea Route.
- Sukharnyy, or Sukhornyy, is 3 kilometres from the northeastern shores of Mikhalkino. It is 11 kilometres (7 mi) long and about 5 kilometres (3 mi) wide. Northeast of Sukhornyy lies a cluster of small islands known as the Morskiye Sotki Islands.
- Piat' Pal'tsev lies 5 kilometres to the southeast of Sukhornyy's southern end. It is 5 kilometres long and has a maximum width of 1.8 kilometres.
- Nazarovsky Island 69.533°N 161.086°E lies on the western side of the Kolyma's western branch, the Prot. Pokhodskaya Kolyma, in an area where there are many small islands. It is 4.5 kilometres long and 1.3 kilometres wide.
- Shtormovoy Island 69.666°N 161.031°E lies offshore, about 10 kilometres (6 mi) to the north of Nazarovsky Island. Shtormovoy is the northernmost island off the Mouths of the Kolyma. It is 4.3 kilometres long and 1.5 kilometres wide.

== History ==
In 1640 Dimitry Zyryan (also called Yarilo or Yerilo) went overland to the Indigirka. In 1641 he sailed down the Indigirka, went east and up the Alazeya. Here they heard of the Kolyma and met Chukchis for the first time. In 1643 he returned to the Indigirka, sent his yasak (tribute) to Yakutsk and went back to the Alazeya. In 1645 he returned to the Lena where he met a party and learned that he had been appointed prikazchik (land administrator) of the Kolyma. He returned east and died in early 1646. In the winter of 1641–42 Mikhail Stadukhin, accompanied by Semyon Dezhnyov, went overland to the upper Indigirka. He spent the next winter there, built boats and sailed down the Indigirka and east to the Alazeya where he met Zyryan. Zyryan and Dezhnyov stayed at the Alazeya, while Stadukhin went east, reaching the Kolyma in the summer of 1644. They built a zimovye (winter quarters), probably at Srednekolymsk, and returned to Yakutsk in late 1645.

In 1892–94 Baron Eduard Von Toll carried out geological surveys in the basin of the Kolyma (among other Far-eastern Siberian rivers) on behalf of the Russian Academy of Sciences (Barr, 1980). During one year and two days the expedition covered 25,000 kilometres (16,000 mi), of which 4,200 kilometres (2,600 mi) were up rivers, carrying out geodesic surveys en route.

The Kolyma is known for its Gulag labour camps and gold mining, both of which have been extensively documented since Joseph Stalin–era Soviet archives opened. The river gives its title to a famous anthology about life in Gulag camps by Varlam Shalamov, The Kolyma Tales.

After the camps were closed, state subsidies, local industries and communication dwindled to almost nothing. Many people have migrated, but those who remain in the area make a living by fishing and hunting. In small fishing settlements, fish are sometimes stored in caves carved from permafrost. The last Americans to visit the Kolyma during the Soviet era, before perestroika, were the crew of the sailing schooner Nanuk in August 1929, whose visit was captured in a film taken by the Nanuk owner's 18-year-old daughter, Marion Swenson. The first two Americans to visit the Kolyma after the Nanuk's visit were writer Wallace Kaufman and journalist Rebecca Clay, who traveled by cutter from Ziryanka to Green Cape in August 1991. Kaufman and his daughter Sylvan and CPA Letty Collins Magdanz also travelled part of the Kolyma in August 1992, the first American visitors since the collapse of the Soviet Union. Both trips were arranged by North-East Scientific and Industrial Center: Ecocenter to try out an ecotourism route which was found to be impractical. In February 2012, the Proceedings of the National Academy of Sciences reported that scientists had grown plants from 30,000-year-old Silene stenophylla fruit, which was stored in squirrel burrows near the banks of the Kolyma river and preserved in permafrost.

== Settlements ==
Settlements at the Kolyma river include (listed downstream) Sinegorye, Debin, Ust-Srednekan, Seymchan, Zyryanka, Srednekolymsk and Chersky.

== Constructions ==
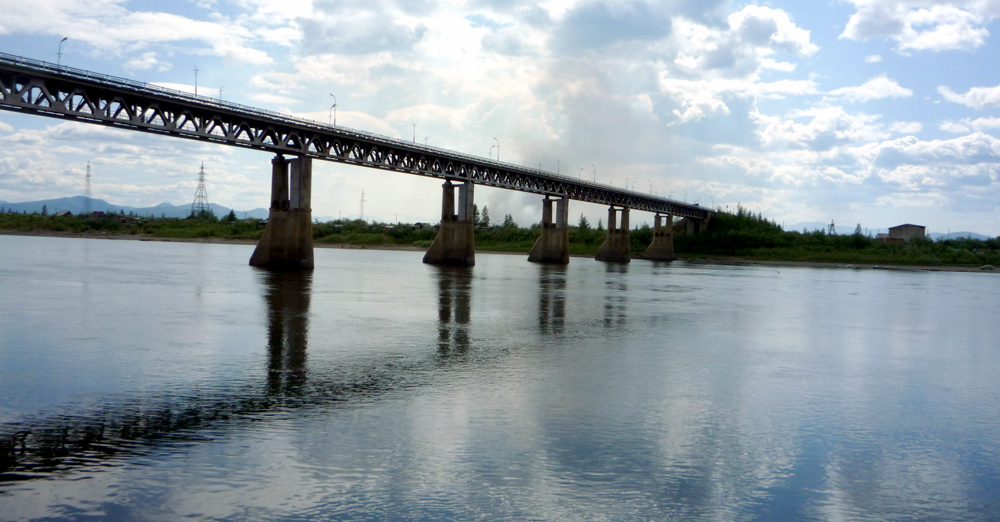
Old bridge over the Kolyma before its dismantling in Debin.

The Kolyma Hydroelectric Station is a hydropower plant at Sinegorye, downstream from the Kolyma Reservoir in the upper part of the river. The plant was started in the 1980s by Kolyma Gestroi and both the plant and the town of Sinegorye were built under the supervision of chief engineer Oleg Kogadovski. The town included an olympic sized swimming pool, an underground rifle range, and many amenities absent in most other small Russian towns. Kogadovski said that in order to attract and employ good talent in such a remote place, the town had to be exceptional. The dam provides most of the electricity to the region including Magadan. the Kolyma dam is an earthen dam some 150 ft high. Air circulation tubes carry frigid winter air into the core of the dam where frozen earth stabilizes the structure. Kolyma Ges. said it was the largest dam ever built in a permafrost region. In 1992 a new hydropower plant was under construction at Ust-Srednekan, the Ust-Srednekan Hydroelectric Plant. Larch forests cleared for the reservoir were cut in winter when the trunks were frozen and easily snapped. The wood was sold for pulp.

There are only a few bridges over the river, including at Ust-Srednekan, at Sinegorye and at Debin (which carries the Kolyma Highway).

== See also ==
- Kolyma (greater region)
- East Siberian Mountains
- List of rivers of Russia
