= Kamen-Mukdykyn =

- Island
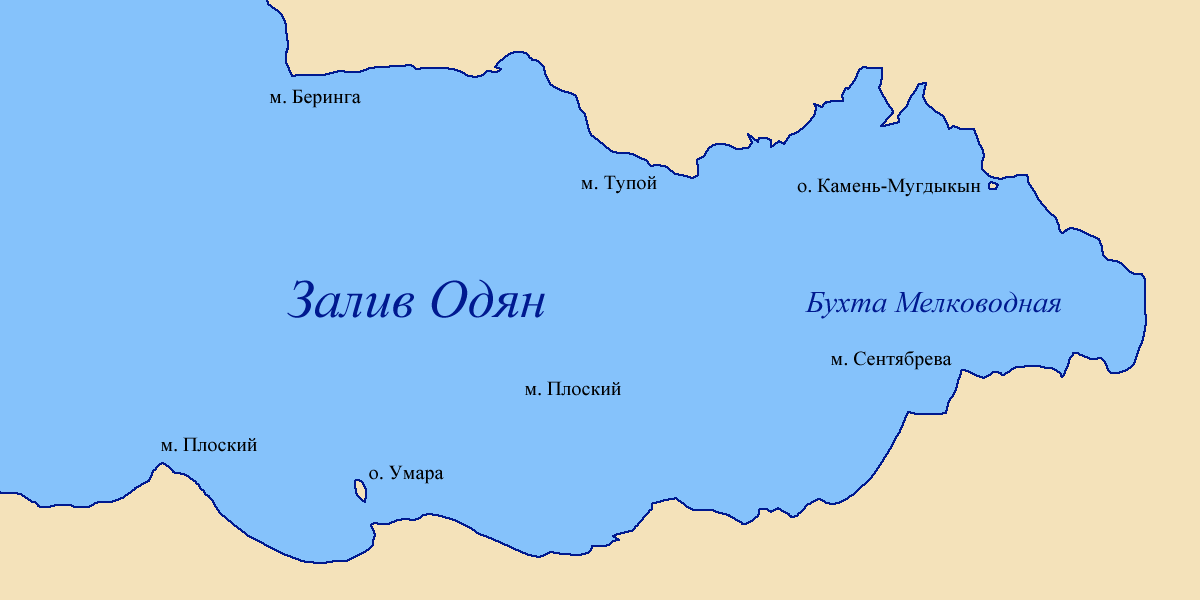
- Map of Odyan Bay

- Location within Magadan Oblast
- Coordinates: 59°15′39.33″N 152°13′12.76″E
- Country: Russian Federation
- Federal subject: Far Eastern Federal District
- Oblast: Magadan Oblast

Kamen-Mukdykyn is a small uninhabited island in the Sea of Okhotsk, in the Russian Far East.

== Geography ==
Kamen-Mukdykyn lies in Odyan Bay. It is 280 m south of the mainland.

Administratively Kamen-Mukdykyn is within the Magadan Oblast, in the Russian Federation.

== See also ==
- Islands of the Sea of Okhotsk
- Islands of the Russian Far East
