= Kekurny Island =

Kekurny Island Остров Кекурный
- Island
- Location within Magadan Oblast
- Coordinates: 59.5255°N 150.955°E
- Country: Russian Federation
- Federal subject: Far Eastern Federal District
- Oblast: Magadan Oblast

Kekurny Island (Russian: Остров Кекурный) is a very small island in the Gertner Inlet of Taui Bay, in the Sea of Okhotsk, within Magadan Oblast, Russian Far East.

== Geography ==
It is a rock islet 21 metres (69 ft) in height, located 700 metres (2,300 ft) off Cape Krasny.

Administratively, Kekurny Island is a part of the city of Magadan.

== See also ==
- Islands of the Sea of Okhotsk
- Islands of the Russian Far East
