= Umara Island =

Umara Умара
- Island
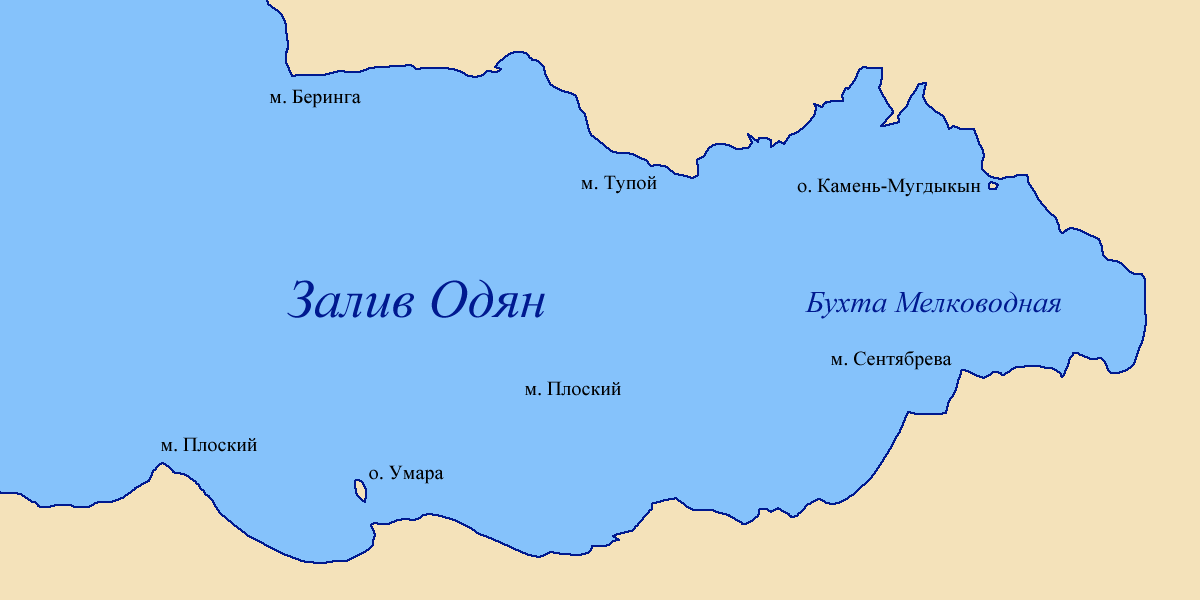
- Map of Odyan Bay

- Location within Magadan Oblast
- Coordinates: 59°9′10″N 151°57′14″E
- Country: Russian Federation
- Federal subject: Far Eastern Federal District
- Oblast: Magadan Oblast
- Elevation: 77 m (253 ft)

Umara Island is an island in the Sea of Okhotsk on the south side of Odyan Bay.

== Geography ==
The island is 0.9 km long and is separated from the northern shore of the Koni Peninsula by a 1 km wide sound. There is a monitoring site for seabirds on the island.

Administratively this island is part of the Magadan Oblast.
