= Shelikan =

- Island
- Location within Magadan Oblast
- Coordinates: 59°35′N 149°08′E
- Country: Russian Federation
- Federal subject: Far Eastern Federal District
- Oblast: Magadan Oblast
- Elevation: 122 m (400 ft)

Shelikan, also Ostrovok Shelikan, is a coastal islet in the Sea of Okhotsk near Magadan. It lies on the south side of Amakhton Bay.

== Geography ==
Shelikan is located on the west side of Taui Bay and is separated from the continental shore by a 2.5 km wide sound. It is 122 m (400 ft) in height and is surrounded by shallow water.

Administratively this island is part of the Magadan Oblast.

== Fauna ==
In the spring and summer one of the largest known colonies of slaty-backed gull in the Russian Far East is found on the island.
