= Taui =

Taui Kava
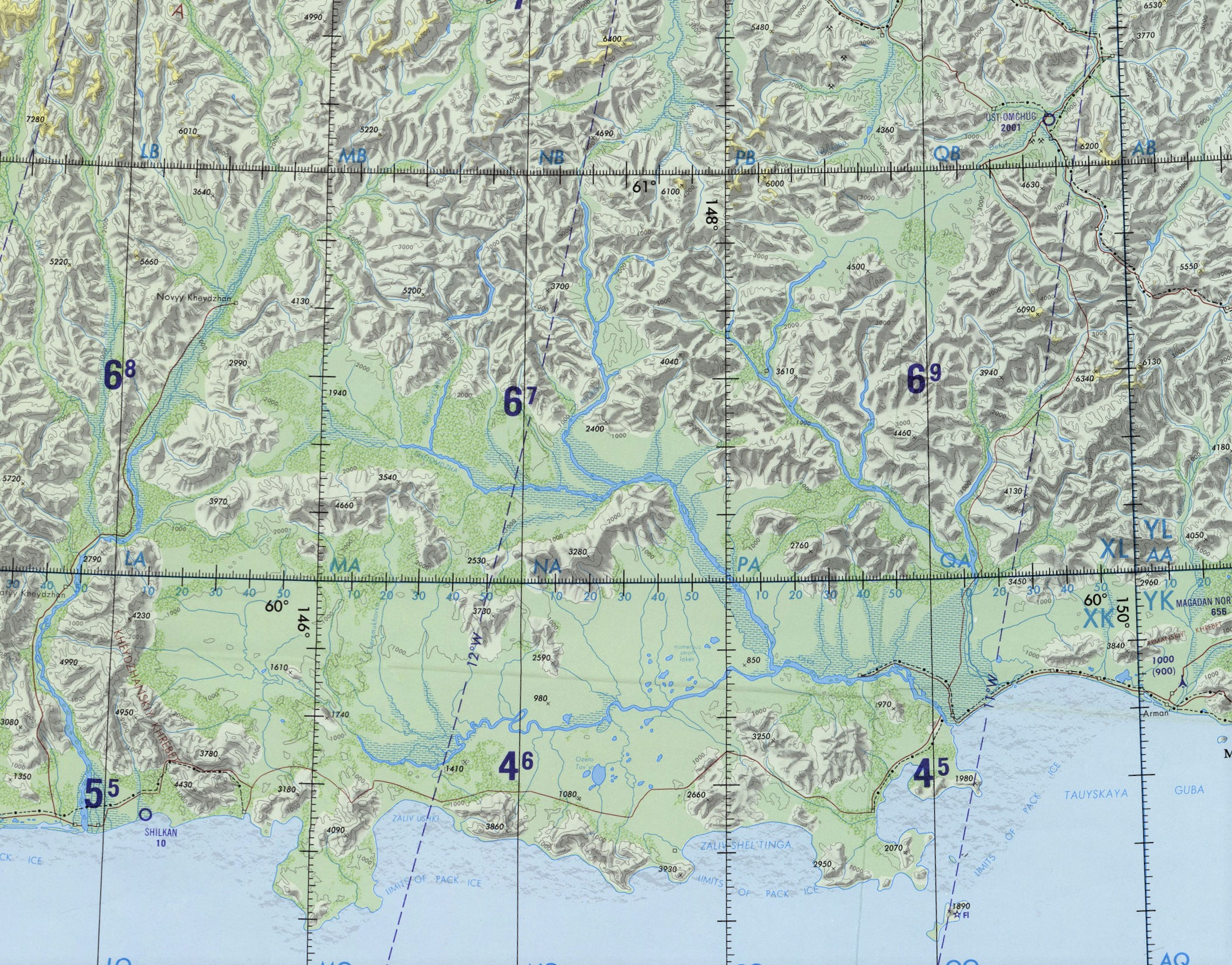
- Taui river basin

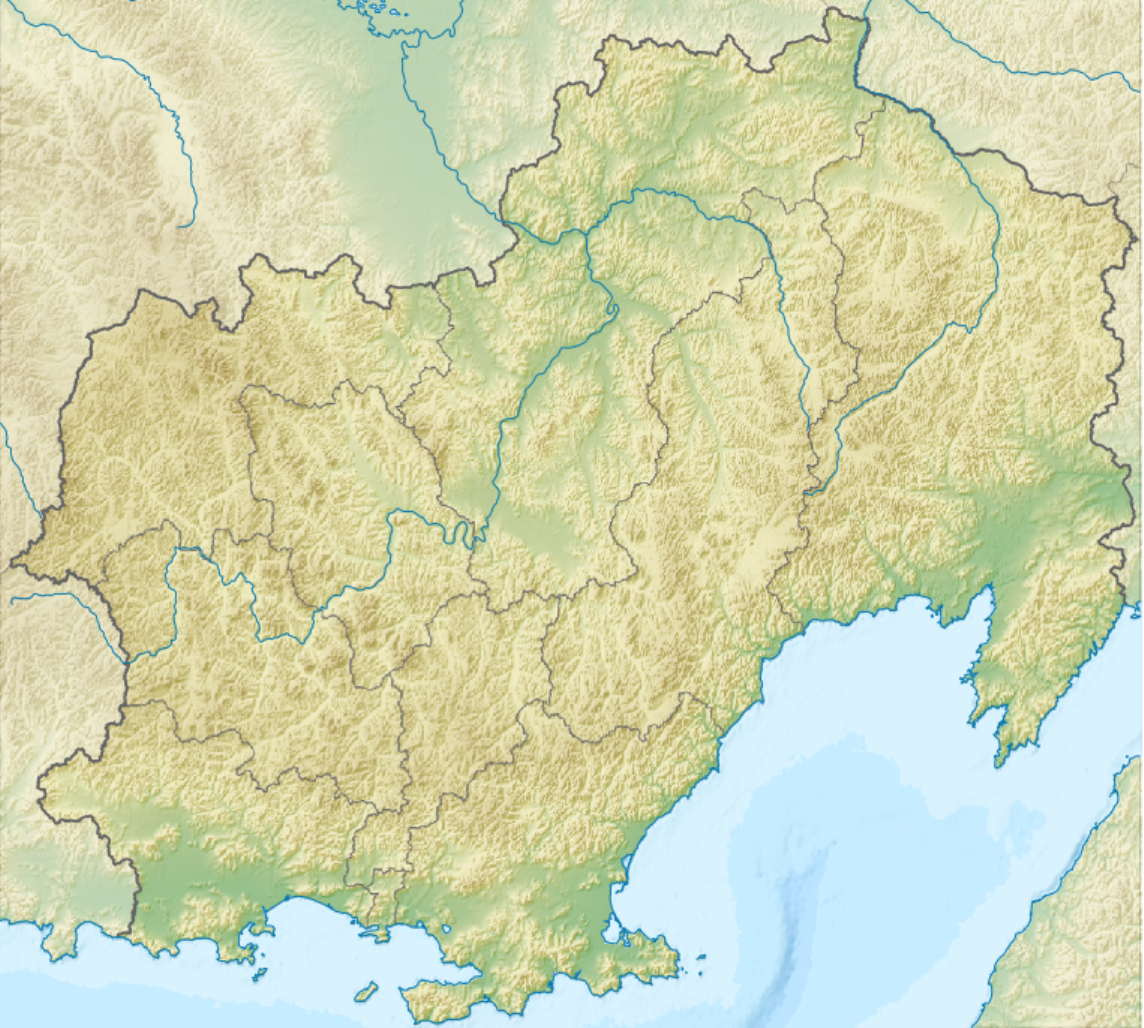
- Mouth location in Magadan Oblast, Russia

Location
- Country: Magadan Oblast, Russia

Physical characteristics
- Source
  - location: Confluence of the Rasava and Lozovaya in Khabarovsk Krai
  - coordinates: 59°52′59″N 145°39′10″E
  - elevation: 125 m (410 ft)
- Mouth: Sea of Okhotsk
  - location: Taui Bay
  - coordinates: 59°37′59″N 149°05′47″E
  - elevation: 0 m (0 ft)
- Length: 378 km (235 mi)
- Basin size: 25,900 km^{2} (10,000 sq mi)
- Discharge
  - average: 347 m^{3}/s (12,300 cu ft/s)

The Taui (Russian: Тауй), also known as Kava (Russian: Кава) for part of its course, is a river in Khabarovsk Krai and Magadan Oblast, Russian Far East. It has a drainage basin of 25,900 square kilometres (10,000 mi^{2}).

The river is a spawning ground for salmon and is part of the Magadan Nature Reserve. Its last stretch is navigable.

== Course ==
The Taui river, as the Kava, is formed at an elevation of 125 m (410 ft) at the confluence of rivers Rasava and Lozovaya flowing from the Kheidzhan Range, Upper Kolyma Highlands.

The Taui flows first southeastwards and then roughly eastwards along the Kava-Taui Plain (Кава-Тауйская равнина), a wide floodplain. In its last stretch it enters an area of wetlands. Finally it flows into the Amakhton Bay, part of the Taui Bay of the Sea of Okhotsk. Its mouth lies west of the Arman lagoon and just southwest of the mouth of the Yana. The river freezes before mid October and stays frozen until mid May.

The Kheidzhan Range separates the Taui basin from the Inya basin to the west. The main tributary of the Taui is the 228 kilometres (142 mi) long Chyolomdzha (Чёломджа) that joins it in its lower course from the left.

== See also ==
- List of rivers of Russia
