= Yana (Sea of Okhotsk) =

Yana Яна
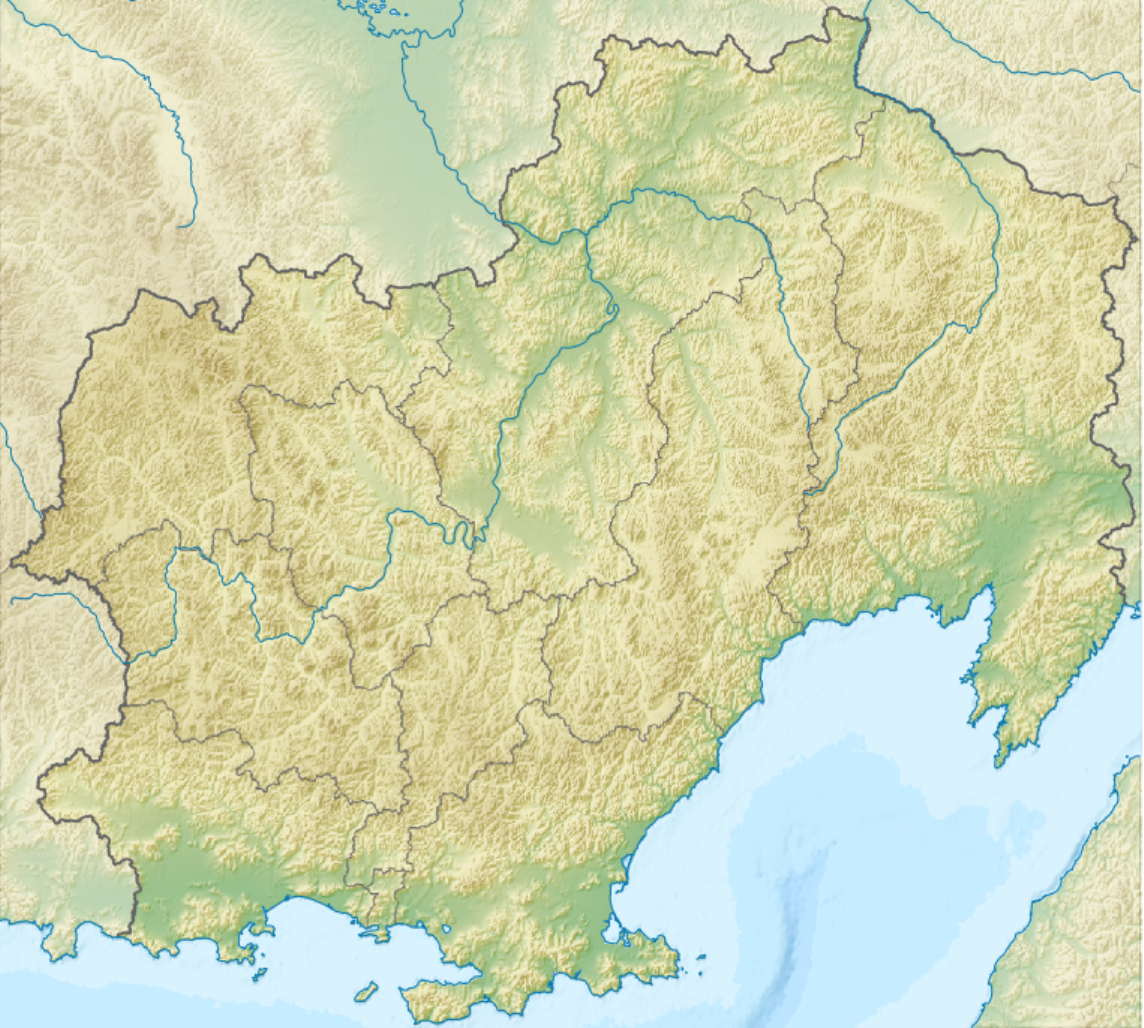
- Mouth location in Magadan Oblast, Russia
- Native name: Яна (Russian)

Location
- Country: Russia
- Federal subject: Magadan Oblast
- District: Olsky District

Physical characteristics
- Source
  - location: Confluence of rivers Pravaya Yana and Levaya Yana
  - coordinates: 60°29′42″N 148°12′37″E
  - elevation: 340 m (1,120 ft)
- Mouth: Sea of Okhotsk
  - location: Taui Bay
  - coordinates: 59°43′40″N 149°23′26″E
  - elevation: 0 m (0 ft)
- Length: 190 km (120 mi)
- Basin size: 8,660 km^{2} (3,340 sq mi)

The Yana (Russian: Яна) is a river in Magadan Oblast, Russian Far East. It has a drainage basin of 8,660 square kilometres (3,340 mi^{2}). Tauisk village is located at the mouth of the river.

The basin of the river includes tundra zones which provide a habitat for the brown bear, bird species such as the long-toed stint and the common snipe, as well as amphibians such as the Siberian salamander.

== Course ==
The Yana river is formed at the confluence of the Right Yana (Правая Яна) and the Left Yana (Левая Яна) at an elevation of 340 m (1,120 ft), from which point the river is 190 kilometres (120 mi) long. Including the 26 kilometres (16 mi) long Right Yana, which has its source in the eastern end of the Suntar-Khayata Range, the total length is 216 kilometres (134 mi). The shorter Left Yana has its source in the Kolyma Highlands.

The Yana flows roughly southeastwards across mountainous terrain. In its last stretch it enters a floodplain among wetlands just east of the Taui River (Kava) and west of the Arman. Finally it flows into the Amakhton Bay, part of the Taui Bay of the Sea of Okhotsk.

The main tributary of the Yana is the 114 kilometres (71 mi) long Seimkan that joins it in its lower course from the left.

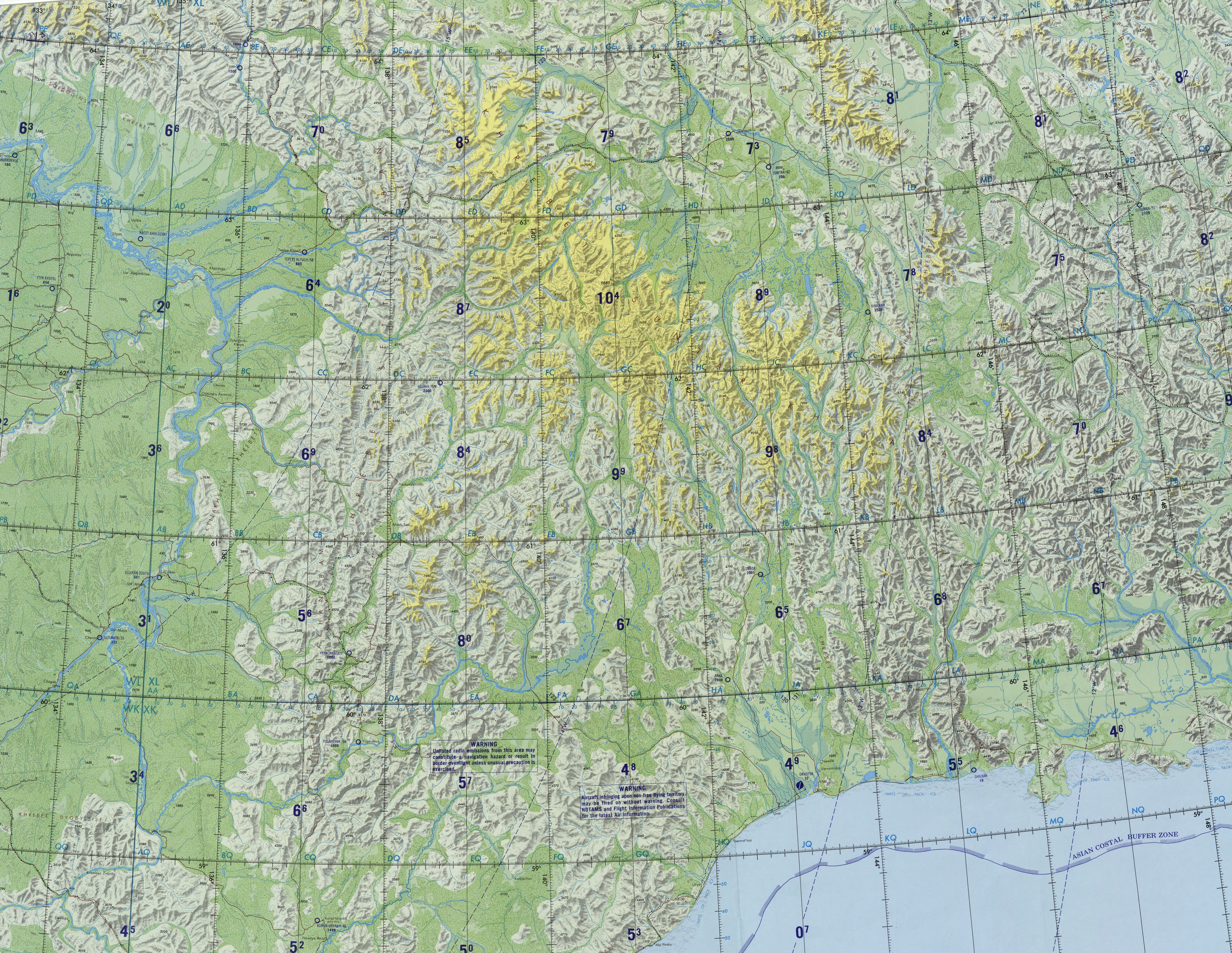
ONC map showing the northern shore of the Sea of Okhotsk.

== See also ==
- List of rivers of Russia
