= Amakhton Bay =

Bay in Sea of Okhotsk, Russia

Coordinates: 59°40′N 149°37′E

Amakhton Bay (Russian: Амахтонский залив; Zaliv Amakhtonsky) is a small bay on the north coast of the Sea of Okhotsk in Magadan Oblast. It forms the northwestern portion of Taui Bay. The bay is entered between the mouth of the Arman River to the northeast and Cape Amakhton to the southwest. It is 48.3 km (about 30 mi) wide. Shelikan lies on the south side of the bay. Tidal currents can reach 2 to 2.5 knots in the bay.

== History ==
American whaleships cruised for bowhead whales in the bay in the 1850s and 1860s. They also traded with the native settlements for milk and fish.
