= Chyolomdzha =

Chyolomdzha Чёломджа / Чаламдя
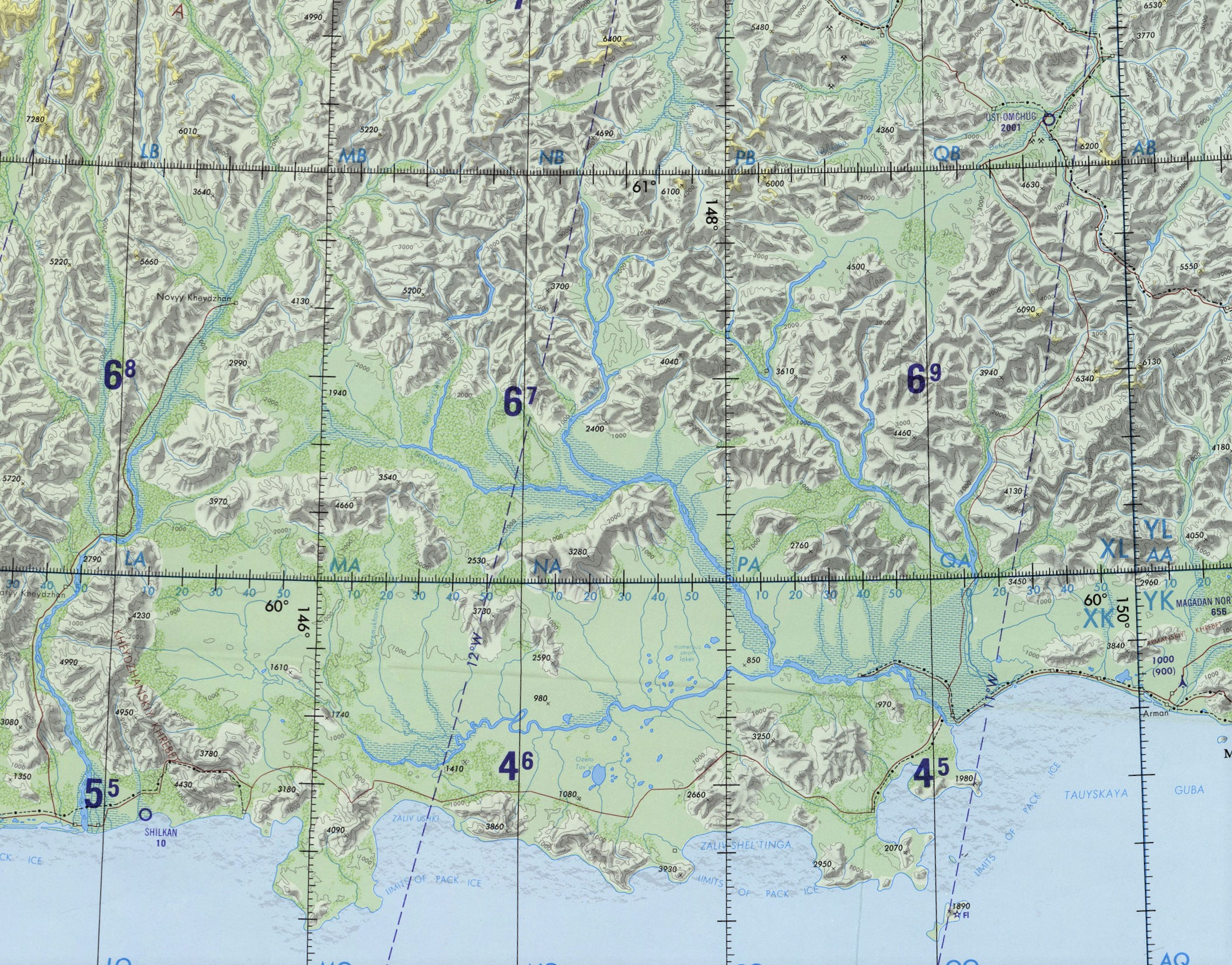

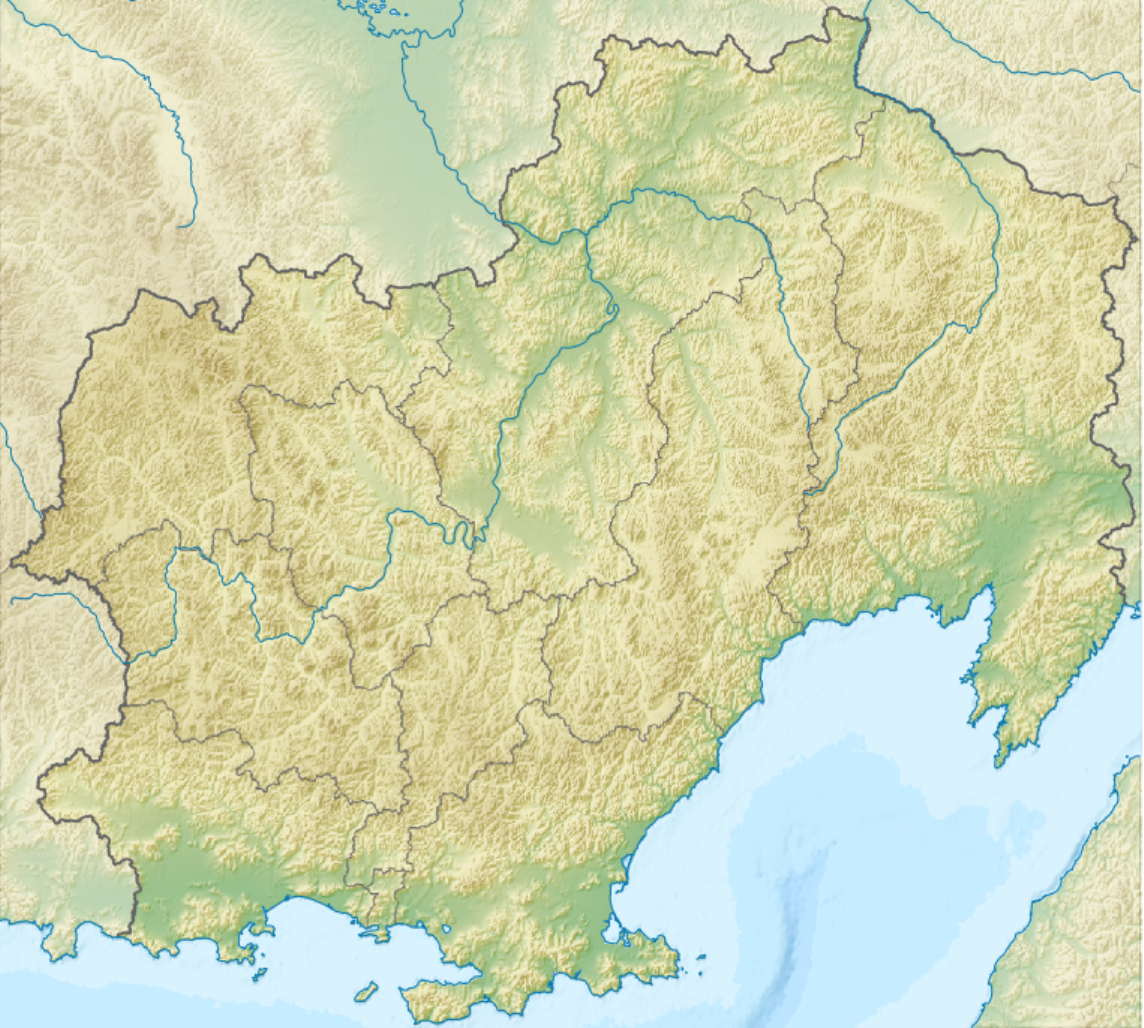
- Mouth location in Magadan Oblast, Russia

Location
- Country: Russia
- Federal subject: Magadan Oblast
- District: Olsky District

Physical characteristics
- Source
  - location: Upper Kolyma Highlands
  - coordinates: 60°34′05″N 145°41′10″E
- Mouth: Taui
  - coordinates: 59°46′52″N 148°15′19″E
- Length: 228 km (142 mi)
- Basin size: 12,000 km^{2} (4,600 sq mi)
- Discharge
  - average: 132 m^{3}/s (4,700 cu ft/s)

Basin features
- Progression: Taui → Sea of Okhotsk

The Chyolomdzha (Russian: Чёломджа; Even: Чаламдя) is a river in Magadan Oblast, Russia. It has a length of 228 kilometres (142 mi) and a drainage basin of 12,000 square kilometres (4,600 mi^{2}).

The Chyolomdzha is the longest tributary of the Taui (Kava) and flows across an uninhabited area, part of the Magadan Nature Reserve. The name of the river originated in the Even language.

== Course ==
The source of the Chyolomdzha is in the Upper Kolyma Highlands. The river heads in a roughly southern direction, flowing fast across mountainous terrain, then it turns to the southeast descending into a floodplain where it slows down and splits into multiple sleeves, while the channels form meanders. Finally the Chyolomdzha joins the left bank of the Taui in the wide Kava-Taui Plain, 66 kilometres (41 mi) from its mouth in the Sea of Okhotsk.

The river freezes yearly between early October and late May. Its main tributary is the 124 km (77 mi) long Burgagylkan (Бургагылкан), joining its left bank in the lower course.

== Fauna ==
Different species of salmonids live in the waters of the Chyolomdzha, including chum salmon, malma, coho salmon and kundzha, as well as grayling.

The banks of the river provide a habitat for the Blakiston's fish owl, an endangered species.

== See also ==
- List of rivers of Russia
