= Zavyalov Island =

Island in the Sea of Okhotsk

Coordinates: 59°03′N 150°37′E

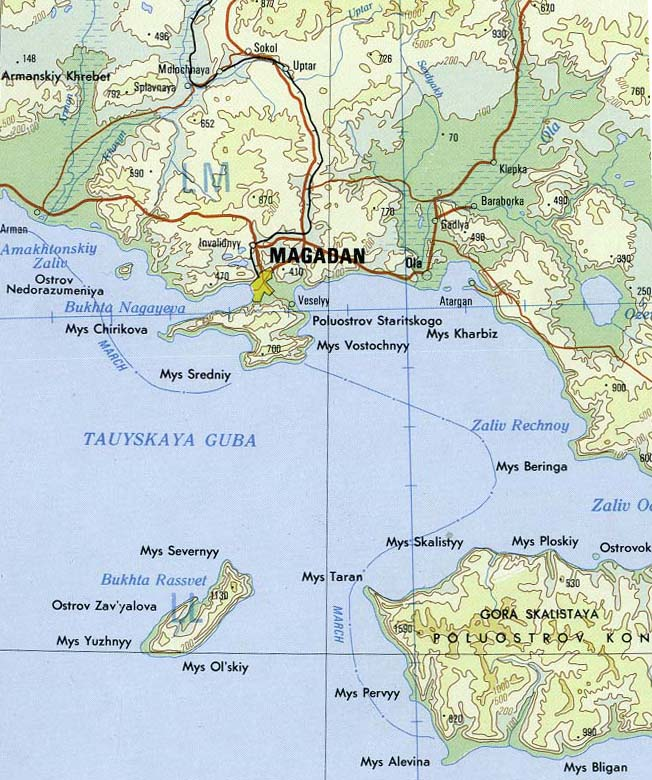
Location of Zavyalov Island south of Magadan

Zavyalov Island (Russian: Остров Завьялова, or Ostrov Zav’yalova), formerly Ola Island (Остров Ольский), is a relatively large island in the Sea of Okhotsk, northwestern Pacific. It is located on the eastern side of Taui Bay, 20 km (12 mi) west of Cape Taran, Koni Peninsula, about 50 km (31 mi) south of the city of Magadan.

Zavyalov is a mountainous island; it is 23.0 km (14.3 mi) long and 7.5 km (4.7 mi) wide. The Siberian dwarf pine (Pinus pumila) and the dwarf birch Betula middendorffii grow on the island. Its shores are a breeding ground for the Steller sea lion.

Administratively Zavyalov Island belongs to the Magadan Oblast of the Russian Federation.

== History ==
Zavyalov Island was frequented by American whaleships cruising for bowhead whales between 1849 and 1885. They called it Bowhead Island. Whaleboats spent the night camping on the island to search for whales the following morning. They also obtained wood from the island and caught fish offshore.
