= Nedorazumeniya Island =

Island in the Sea of Okhotsk, Russia

Nedorazumeniya
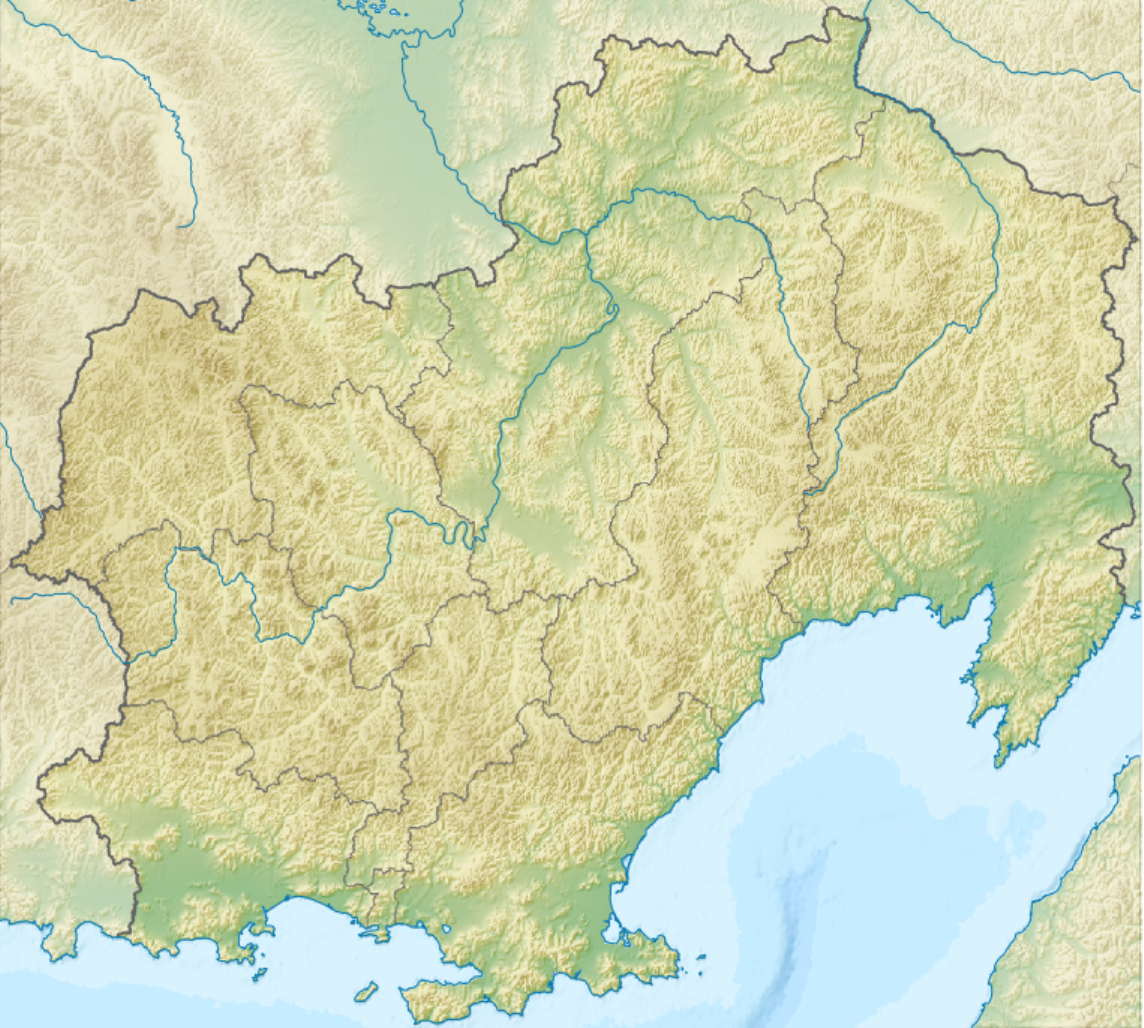
- Location within Magadan Oblast
- Interactive map of Nedorazumeniya

Geography
- Location: Sea of Okhotsk
- Coordinates: 59°35′N 150°25′E
- Area: 4.5 km^{2} (1.7 sq mi)
- Highest elevation: 251 m (823 ft)

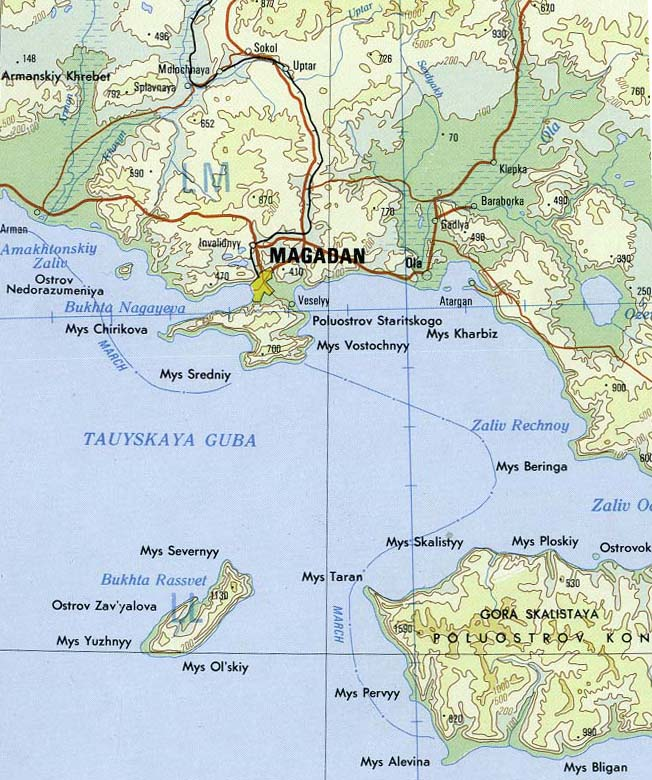
Location of Nedorazumeniya Island west of Magadan harbor

Nedorazumeniya Island (Russian: Остров Недоразумения - Ostrov Nedorazumeniya; literally Island of misunderstanding) is an island on the north coast of the Sea of Okhotsk. It lies on the north side of Taui Bay, between Amakhton Bay to the west and Nagaev Bay to the east. It is about 20 kilometres (12 mi) west of the city of Magadan.

Nedorazumeniya Island lies 3 kilometres (1.9 mi) off the coast and is roughly triangular in shape. It is 3.5 kilometres (2.2 mi) long and has a maximum width of about 2 kilometres (1.2 mi).

On Nedorazumeniya's northeastern headland there is a settlement called Ribachiy.

Administratively Nedorazumeniya Island belongs to the Magadan Oblast of the Russian Federation.

== Etymology ==
The name of the island is remarkable. "Nedorazumeniye" in Russian means "misunderstanding" or "confusion". The island got such a strange name because it was originally not mapped by a Russian expedition in the 1910s. Later the mistake was identified and corrected.

== History ==
Between 1853 and 1885, American and Russian whaleships anchored between Nedorazumeniya Island and the mainland to obtain shelter from storms, procure wood and water from the island, flense whales, or boil oil. They called the island Fabius Island, while the anchorage was called Fabius Harbor. Both features are named after the ship Fabius (432 tons), of New Bedford, which frequented Taui Bay in the early 1850s. A graveyard existed on the north side of the island. Boats also spent the night on the island after cruising for bowhead whales all day.

A temporary whaling station was established on the island by two American vessels in the summer of 1858. It only consisted of a tent of sails, a thatched cook house, and a small tryworks. Sixteen men, eight from each ship, were given provisions for two months and worked on shares while the ships cruised to the south. Among them were the second mates from both vessels, two boatsteerers (harpooners), a carpenter, a cook, and a steward. With two whaleboats they searched for bowhead and gray whales for as long as four days, ranging west to near the Taui River, east to Ola, and south to "Jeffrey's Point" (Mys Taran). They regularly cruised off "Jeanette Point" (Mys Chirikova) and often visited "Dobry Town" (probably Arman). Whales were also spotted by two men atop the island. They fished for salmon in the rivers at high water and dug for clams at low water. The men encountered bears on several occasions as well. They also traded meat and salmon for bread with other foreign whaleships. When they caught a whale, it was towed ashore, flensed at low tide, and the blubber rendered into oil using a single trypot. In the fall the men and their catch were picked up by their respective vessels.
