= Magadan Nature Reserve =

Strict nature reserve in Magadan Oblast, Russia

- Russian: Магаданский заповедник (Also: Magadansky)
- IUCN category Ia (strict nature reserve)
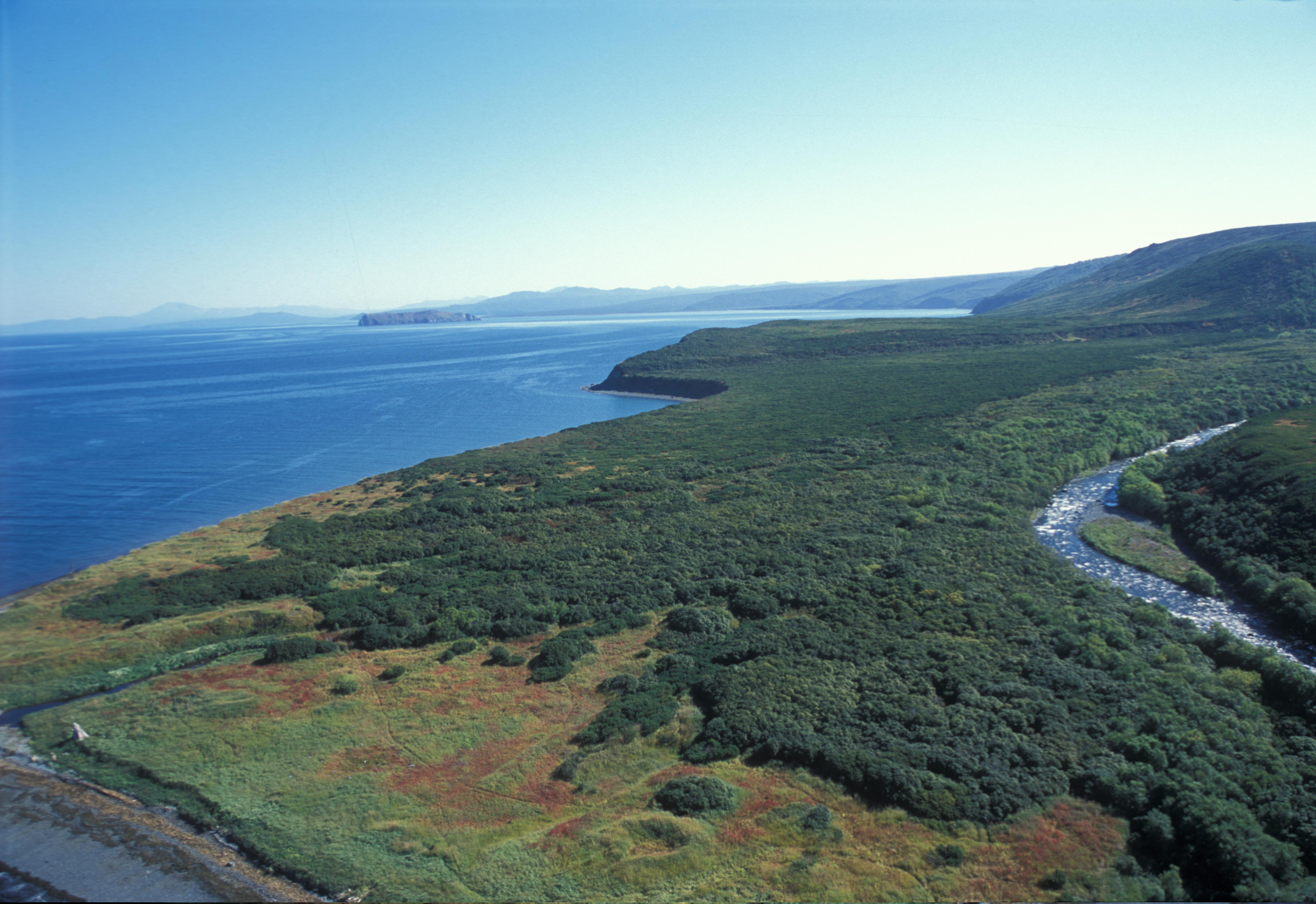
- Magadan Zapovednik

- Location within Russia
- Location: Magadan Oblast
- Nearest city: Magadan
- Coordinates: 59°38′31″N 147°26′55″E
- Area: 883,817 hectares (2,183,959 acres; 3,412 sq mi)
- Established: 1982
- Governing body: Ministry of Natural Resources and Environment (Russia)
- Website: http://www.magterra.ru/

Magadan Nature Reserve (Russian: Магаданский заповедник) (also Magadansky) is a Russian zapovednik (strict nature reserve) located in four different sectors across the Magadan region of the Russian Far East, including the northern shore of the Sea of Okhotsk. All sites are far away from each other, have different climates, topography, flora and fauna, and no settlements or transportation routes. On the streams of the territory are some of the largest undisturbed spawning sites of the chum and coho salmon. One area, the Yam Islands, is home to colonies of sea birds, with a total of up to 6 million individuals. These include Auklets-crumbs, guillemot, spectacled guillemots, lund, and the horned puffin. The reserve is situated in the Olsky District of Magadan Oblast. Recently, the reserve has experimented with very limited cruise ship visits (under 200 passengers) to one of the islands, and plans are being studied for ways to increase educational eco-tourism in the highly inaccessible area.

== Topography ==
The largest sector, Kava-Chyolomdzha (624,456 ha (1,543,060 acres)), is in the southwest corner of Magadan Oblast. It is separated from the Okhotsk Sea by the Kava-Taui regional nature reserve.

The second largest sector is the Seymchan section (117,839 ha (291,190 acres)) located inland by the right bank of the Kolyma River, 520 km (320 mi) from the city of Magadan.

The third largest sector is the Ola section (103,434 ha (255,590 acres)), which occupies the western part of the Koni Peninsula that extends into the Okhotsk Sea.

The fourth sector is the Yama section (38,809 ha (95,900 acres)), in the southwest of the region, and itself is divided into coastal, floodplain, and island subsections.

== Climate and ecoregion ==
Magadan is located in the Cherskii-Kolyma mountain tundra ecoregion. This ecoregion covers the mountainous areas of northeast Siberia. It is an ecoregion of extreme cold and extreme aridity.

The climate of Magadan is Subarctic climate, without dry season (Köppen climate classification Subarctic climate (Dfc)). This climate is characterized by mild summers (only 1–3 months above 10 °C (50.0 °F)) and cold, snowy winters (coldest month below −3 °C (26.6 °F)).

== Flora and fauna ==
More than half of the reserve territory is coniferous forest, mostly larch (Larix gmelinii). The second most common tree species is the Creeping cedar. Among mammals, the common species are the bank voles, chipmunks, pika, hare, brown bear, fox, sable, ermine, and mink.

== Ecotourism ==
As a strict nature reserve, the Magadan Reserve is mostly closed to the general public, although scientists and those with 'environmental education' purposes can make arrangements with park management for visits. The reserve does, however, make available to the public the ability to go on eco-tourist excursions on the site, but public visitors must join a group led by a reserve ranger, and must obtain written permits in advance. There is a public visitor center with nature exhibits at the reserves main office in the city of Magadan.

== See also ==
- List of Russian Nature Reserves (class 1a 'zapovedniks')
