= Telan Island =

Telfart
- Island
- Location within Magadan Oblast
- Coordinates: 60°54′4″N 159°52′35″E
- Country: Russian Federation
- Federal subject: Far Eastern Federal District
- Oblast: Magadan Oblast
- Elevation: 505 m (1,657 ft)

Telan Island, also Ostrov Telan, is an island in the Sea of Okhotsk, roughly 1 mile south-southwest of Mys Vnutrenniy. It is described as "a very conspicuous island resembling a castle."

== Geography ==
The island is located at the southern end of the Taygonos Peninsula, which separates the Gizhigin Bay from the Penzhina Bay. It is roughly triangular in shape and has a maximum length of 1.7 km; it is separated from the continental shore by a 0.5 km wide sound.

Administratively Telan Island is part of the Magadan Oblast.
