= Spafaryev Islands =

Spafaryev Islands Остров Спарафьева
- Island group
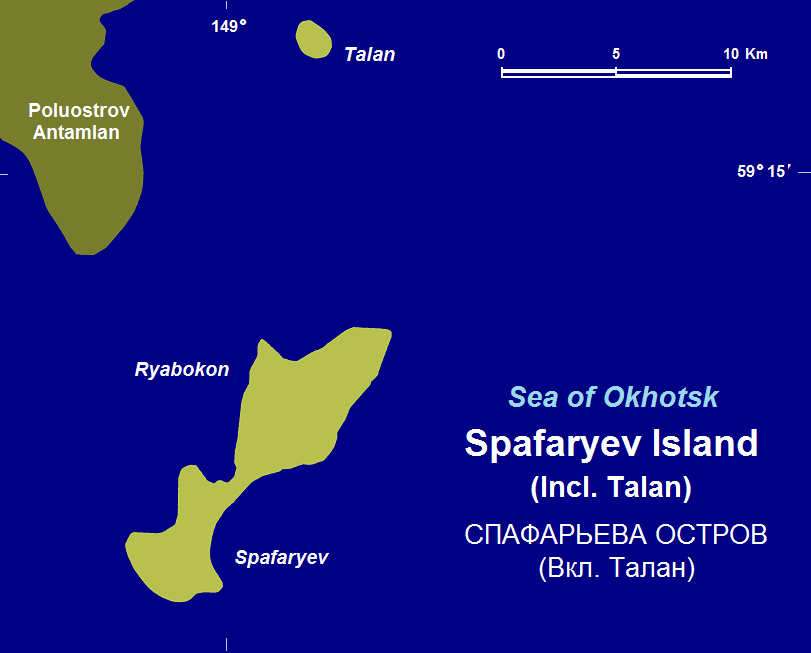
- Spafaryev and Talan Islands

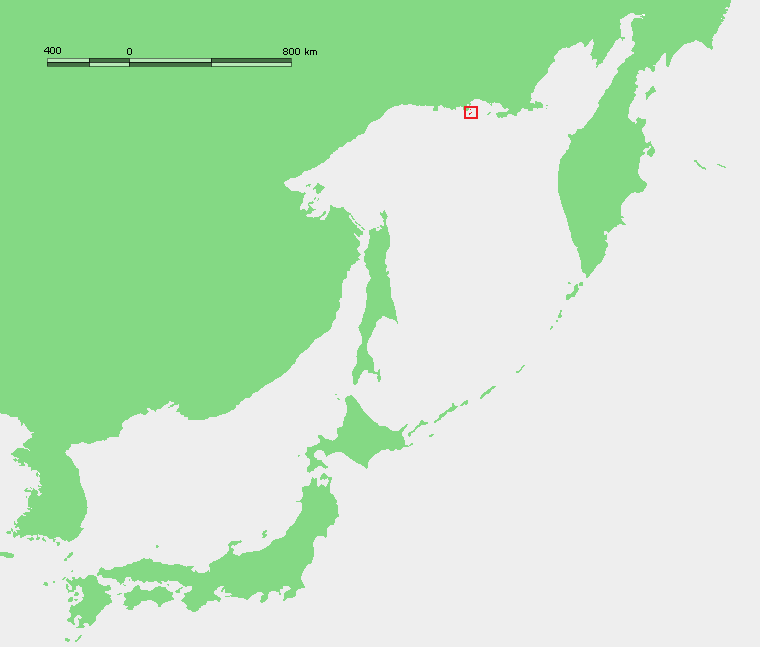
- Location of the Spafaryev Islands in the Sea of Okhotsk.

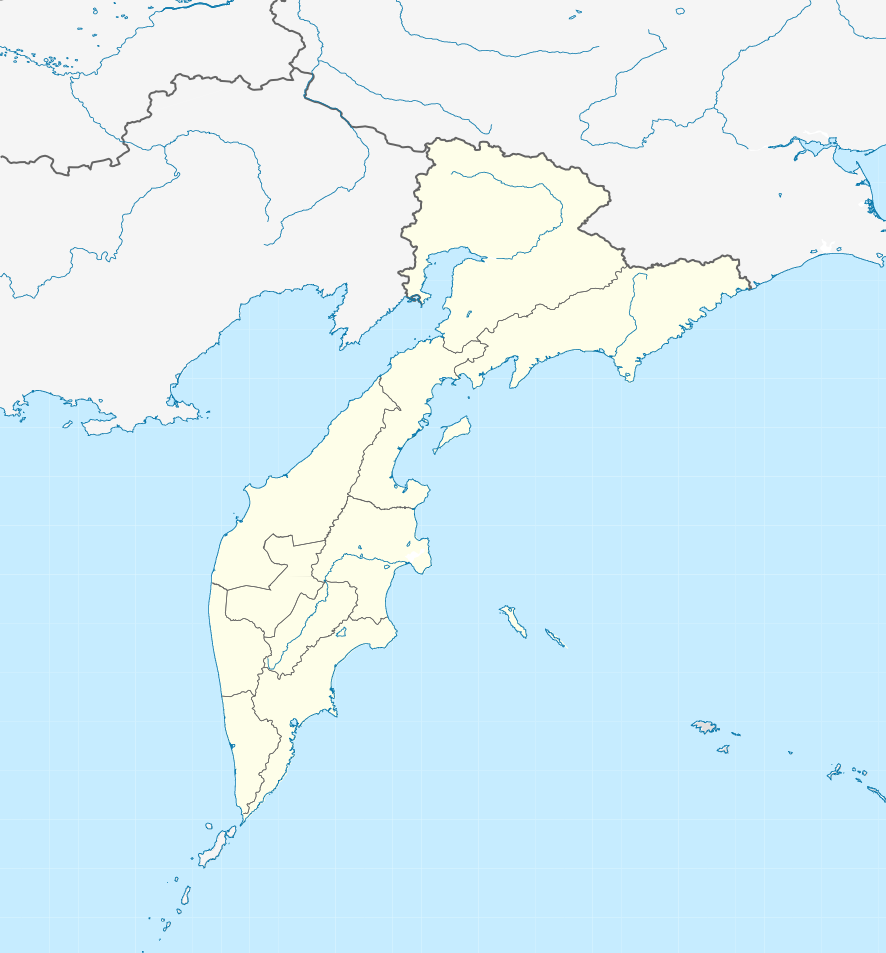
- Location within Kamchatka Krai
- Country: Russian Federation
- Federal subject: Far Eastern Federal District
- Oblast: Magadan Oblast

The Spafaryev Islands, or Spafaryev Island (Остров Спарафьева; Ostrov Spafar’yeva), a relatively large double island, are located in the Sea of Okhotsk. It was formerly known as Korovi Island. It lies 7 km east of the Antamlan Peninsula (also known as Khmitevsky), the southernmost peninsula enclosing the Taui Bay (Тауйская губа; Tauyskaya Guba) from its western side.

Administratively these islands belong to the Magadan Oblast of the Russian Federation.

== Etymology ==
The Spafaryev Islands were named after Major General knight Leontiy Spafaryev (1765–1847) of the Imperial Russian Navy. Spafaryev was Director of the Russian Lighthouse Administration and cartographer of the Russian Admiralty.

== History ==
The islands were frequented by American and French whaleships hunting bowhead and gray whales between 1849 and 1885. Talan was called Green Island, while Spafaryev was called Fog Island. Boats were sent ashore to shoot seabirds and collect eggs and berries as well as to search for whales.

== Geography ==
The Spafaryev Islands are composed of two islands joined by a narrow landspit, less than 750 m wide.

- The northern "island", Ryabokon Island (Ostrov Ryabokon’), is roughly triangular in shape. It is the larger of the two, being 9 km (5.6 mi) long and having a maximum width of 5 km (3.1 mi).
- Spafaryev Island proper is located at the southern end. It is roughly shovel-shaped and is 7 km (4.3 mi) long and has a maximum width of 4.5 km (2.8 mi).
- Talan Island (Остров Талан) 59°18′N 149°05′E, is a small roundish island, which lies 11 km (6.8 mi) to the north of Spafaryev's northern tip. It is 2 km (1.2 mi) across. Large colonies of seabirds nest on the island in the spring and summer, including over a million crested auklet, a few hundred thousand tufted and horned puffin, tens of thousands of black-legged kittiwake, and thousands of parakeet auklet and ancient murrelet. Common murre also nest here and in the summer dovekie congregate on the island. Steller's sea eagle prey on these seabirds.
