= Odyan Bay =

Bay on the Sea of Okhotsk

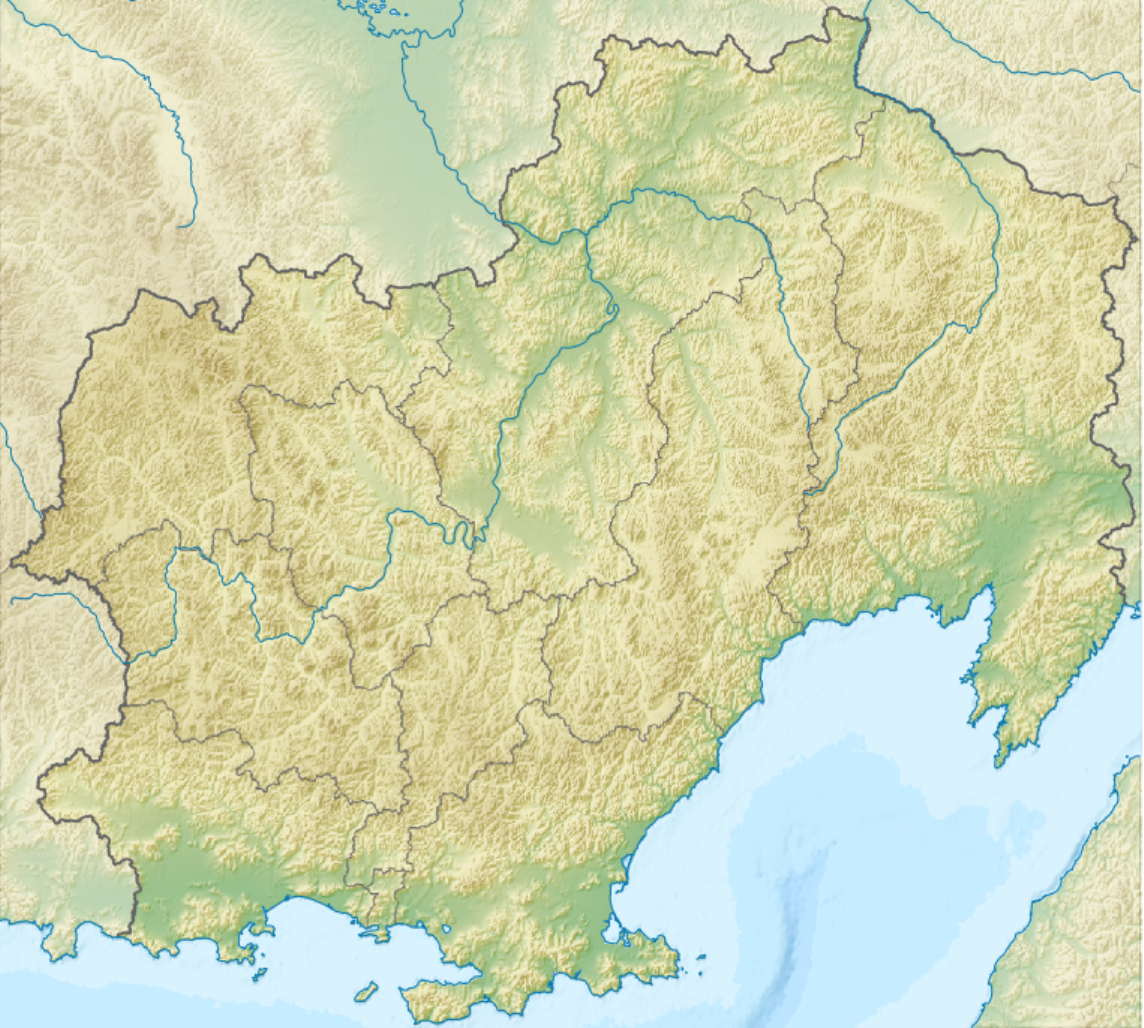
- Location in Magadan Oblast
- Location: Subarctic
- Coordinates: 59°12′N 152°01′E
- Ocean/sea sources: Sea of Okhotsk
- Basin countries: Russia
- Max. width: 19.3 km (12.0 mi)

Odyan Bay (Russian: Залив Одян, trans.: Zaliv Odyan) is a small bay on the north coast of the Sea of Okhotsk. It is in the eastern corner of Taui Bay and washes the Koni Peninsula on the south. It is 19.3 km (about 12 mi) wide. The high entrance points of the bay merge to form a low, sandy shore at its head. Sea ice remains in the bay longer than in other parts of Taui Bay. It is sheltered from all but west winds. Umara Island lies just off its south shore.
