= Taui Bay =

Taui Bay Тауйская губа
- Bay
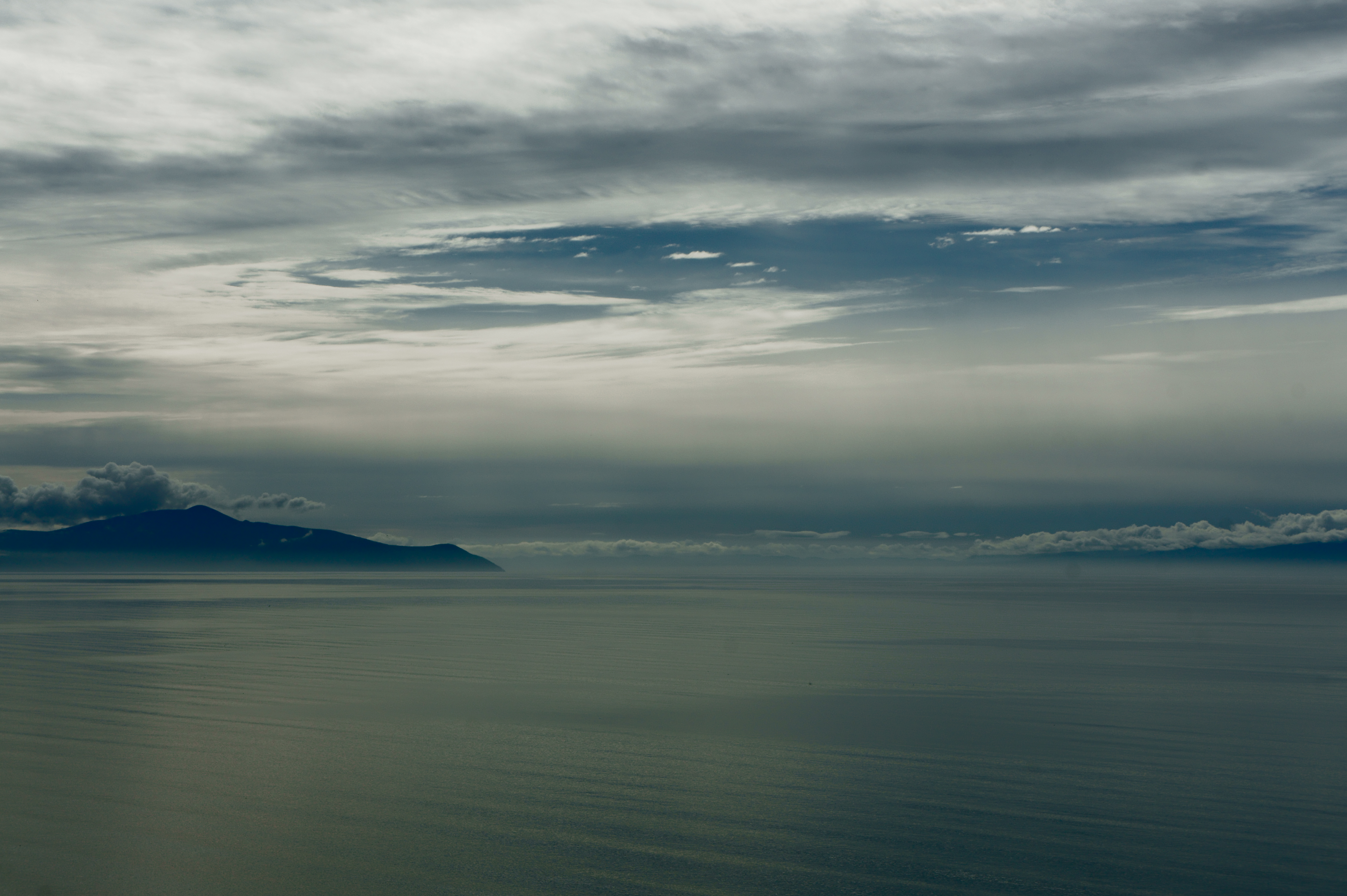

- Location within Magadan Oblast
- Coordinates: 59°18′N 150°24′E
- Country: Russian Federation
- Federal subject: Far Eastern Federal District
- Oblast: Magadan Oblast

Taui Bay (Russian: Тауйская губа; Tauyskaya Guba) is a body of water in the Sea of Okhotsk off the coast of the Magadan Oblast in Russia. The bay opens to the south.

== Geography ==
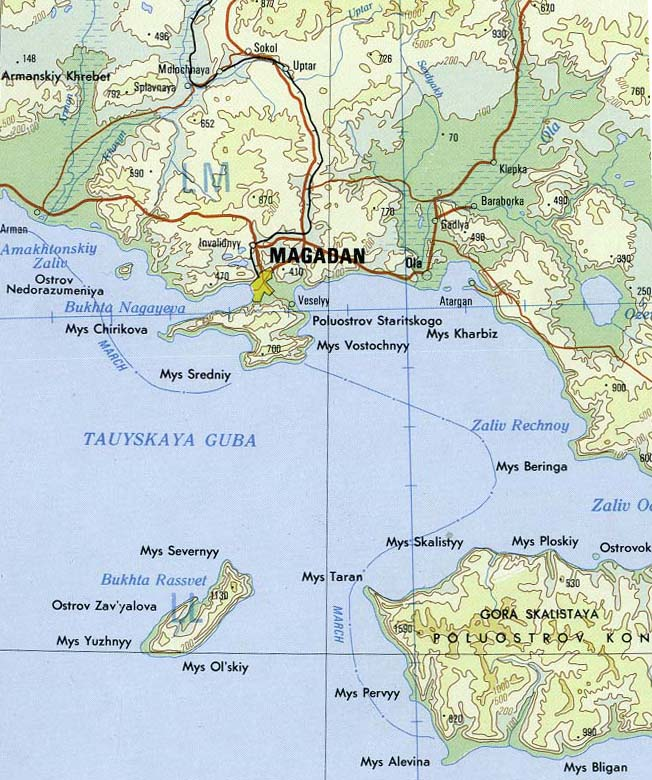
A map of the Magadan area

It is some 130 km (80 mi) wide and 75 km (46 mi) deep, and is enclosed by the Koni Peninsula with Odyan Bay and Zavyalov Island on its eastern side and by Spafaryev Island on its southwestern end. Ice occurs in the bay from the middle of October to the middle of June. Tides are semidiurnal. Springs rise about 4.5 m (14.75 ft), while neaps rise 1.8 to 2.1 m (5.9 to 6.9 ft).

The enclosed area is ca. 10 000 km^{2}, and the average depth 50–60 m (165-196 ft). The Arman, Ola, Yana and Taui rivers drain into the bay. The city of Magadan is situated the centrally at the end of the bay, on the isthmus of the Staritsky Peninsula separated from the mainland by the smaller Nagayev Bay on the west and Gertner Bay on the east.

== History ==
Taui Bay was frequented by American, French, and Russian whaleships hunting bowhead and gray whales between 1849 and 1885. The bark Isabella, of New Bedford, reported as many as thirty ships in the bay, all whaling. These ships usually sought shelter to obtain wood and water, flense whales, or boil oil in Fabius Harbor, between the mainland and Fabius Island (Ostrov Nedorazumeniya), or Jeannette Harbor (Nagayeva Bay), under Jeannette Point (Mys Chirikova). Some traded calico for fresh salmon from the natives.

On 12 August 1852, the whaleship Liancourt, of Havre, was wrecked in the bay during a squall. Her crew were rescued by nearby vessels. A ship found casks with provisions and pieces of the wreck to the west of the bay about ten days later.

== Fauna ==
There are a number of large colonies of common murre in the bay. Beluga whales are also occasionally sighted in the bay – they were formerly seen here regularly.
