= Koni Peninsula =

Peninsula in Russian Far East

Coordinates: 59.05°N 151.52°E

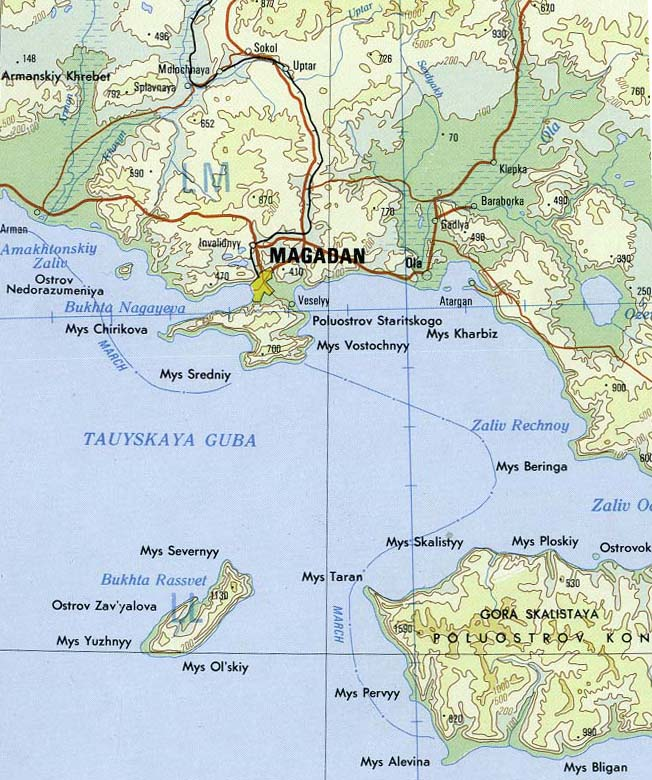
A map of the Magadan area, showing the western part of the Koni Peninsula, lower right

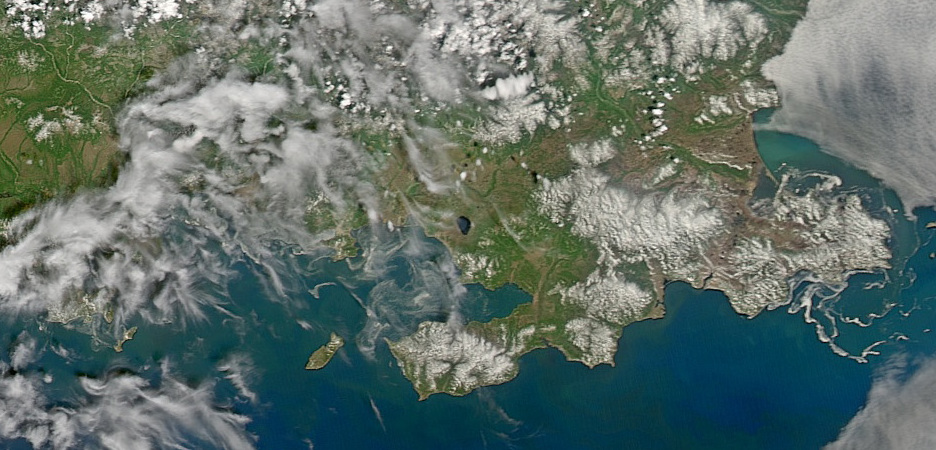
Satellite view of the Koni Peninsula

The Koni Peninsula projects into the Sea of Okhotsk in Magadan Oblast, in the Russian Far East, and has an area of 103,434 hectares.

Its north-western shores are on the Taui Bay. Its north-eastern shores are on the Odyan Bay; the latter one resolves into the Nerpichya Bay ("Pusa Bay"). The Peninsula's south-eastern shore is on the Zabiyaka Bay. From the Zabiyaka Bay northwards the Siglan Bay makes a notch into the isthmus between the peninsula and the mainland, into the valley of the Siglan River.

The Ola sector of the Magadan Nature Reserve is situated on the peninsula, in its western part. Its eastern border runs from Cape Ploskiy (Плоский, "Flat") in the north approximately south-eastwards along several watersheds (Note: Reserve's land boundary: from Cape Ploskiy, along the right bank of River Khindzha, then along the watershed between Khindzha (Хинджа) and Right Khindzha, onto the watershed between the basins of rivers Burgauli Бургаули and Antara Антара, and rivers Umara Умара, Orokholindzha Орохолинджа, Bogurchan Богурчан, encompasses the catchment area of the Left Claw and Right Claw streams, and goes down to a point on the shore of the Sea of Okhotsk 9km eastwards of the mouth of Antara.) down to the mouth of the Antara River (about 9 kilometers east of Cape Bligan (Блиган).) The shores of the reserve are surrounded by the buffer zone, a 2-kilometer wide strip of the sea from Cape Ploskiy to two nameless streams 9km to the east of the Antara River. Like in the Reserve, any human activities (such as hunting, fishing, Laminaria harvesting, etc.) are prohibited. The Ola sector was the first part of the Reserve, established in 1947 after the research carried out following the February 19, 1941 directive of Dalstroy directorate.

The peninsula adjoins the territory of the regional hunting reserve in the continental part of the Magadan Oblast.

The relief of the Koni Peninsula is mostly mountainous, with peaks rising to 1,300-1,500 meters above sea level. The highest of them is Mount Skalistaya, 1,548 meters. The rivers are small and rapid. In the central part there are small volcanic lakes.

Its westernmost promontory is Cape Taran ("Cape Ram"). There is a lighthouse (international code M 8015) on its slope.
