= Magadan Oblast =

First-level administrative division of Russia

Magadan Oblast Магаданская область (Russian)
- Oblast
- Flag Coat of arms

- Coordinates: 62°54′N 153°42′E
- Country: Russia
- Federal district: Far Eastern
- Economic region: Far Eastern
- Established: December 3, 1953
- Administrative center: Magadan

Government
  - Body: Oblast Duma
  - Governor: Sergey Nosov

Area
  - Total: 462,464 km^{2} (178,558 sq mi)
  - Rank: 11th

Population (2021 census)
  - Total: 136,085
  - Estimate (2018): 144,091
  - Rank: 81st
  - Density: 0.294261/km^{2} (0.762132/sq mi)
  - Urban: 96.4%
  - Rural: 3.6%

GDP (nominal, 2024)
  - Total: ₽404 billion (US$4.74 billion)
  - Per capita: ₽3.02 million (US$35,407.72)
- Time zone: UTC+11 (MSK+8)
- ISO 3166 code: RU-MAG
- License plates: 49
- OKTMO ID: 44000000
- Official languages: Russian
- Website: http://www.magadan.ru/

Magadan Oblast (Note: /mæɡəˌdæn ˈɒbləst/; Russian: Магаданская область, romanized: Magadánskaya óblastʹ, IPA: [məgɐˈdanskəjə ˈobləsʲtʲ]) is a federal subject (an oblast) of Russia. It is geographically located in the Far East region of the country, and is administratively part of the Far Eastern Federal District. Magadan Oblast has a population of 136,085 (2021 Census), making it the least populated oblast and the third-least populated federal subject in Russia.

Magadan is the largest city and the capital of Magadan Oblast with the majority of the oblast's inhabitants living in the city itself. The coastline has a less severe climate than the interiors, although both are relatively cold for their latitudes.

It borders Chukotka Autonomous Okrug in the north, Kamchatka Krai in the east, Khabarovsk Krai in the south and the Sakha Republic in the west. The economy is primarily based on mining, particularly gold, silver and other non-ferrous metals.

== History ==
Magadan Oblast was established on December 3, 1953 in what had popularly been known as Kolyma. As a result of considerable raw resources, especially gold, silver, tin, and tungsten deposits, mining activities and road building had been developed during the Stalin era in the 1930s and 1940s under the coordination of Dalstroy and its forced labor camps. Upon Stalin's death, Dalstroy was disbanded and the regional administration took over many of its former responsibilities.

From then on, paid labor replaced most of the convict-based manpower, attracted by the region's rapid economic expansion, especially the gold-mining interests.

The indigenous peoples of the region, including the Evens, Koryaks, Yupiks, Chukchis, Orochs, Chuvans and Itelmens, who had traditionally lived from fishing along the Sea of Okhotsk coast or from reindeer herding in the River Kolyma valley, suffered from the industrialization of the area but were able to rely on institutional support until 1987 when Perestroika started to cause many of the older structures to close. As a result, many of those who can no longer rely on traditional sources of income are now unemployed.

Chukotka Autonomous Okrug was formerly administratively subordinated to Magadan Oblast, but declared its separation in 1991.

On 4 July 1997, Magadan, alongside Bryansk, Chelyabinsk, Saratov, and Vologda signed a power-sharing agreement with the government of Russia, granting it autonomy. The agreement would be abolished on 30 January 2002.

== Geography ==
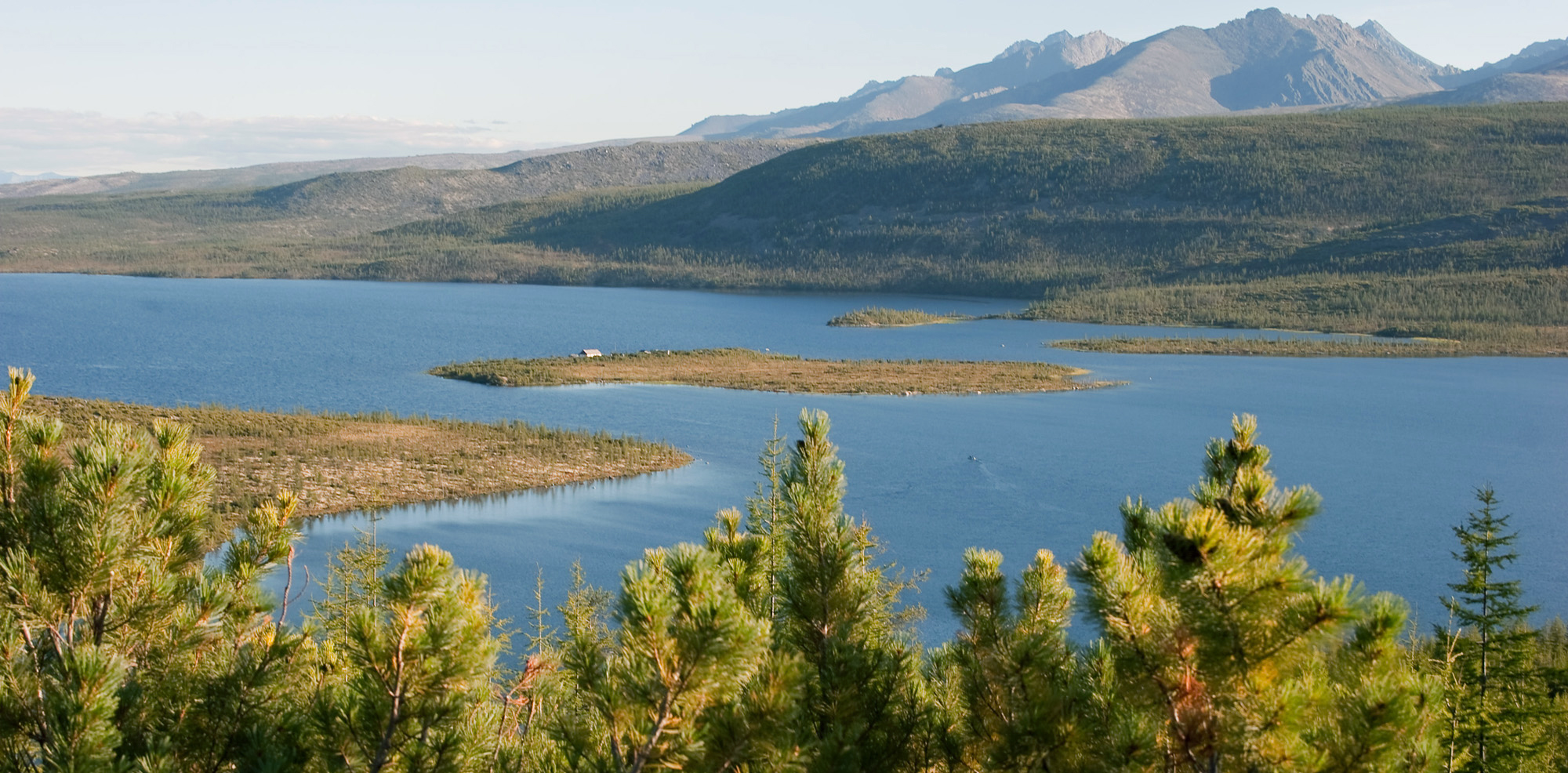
Jack London Lake

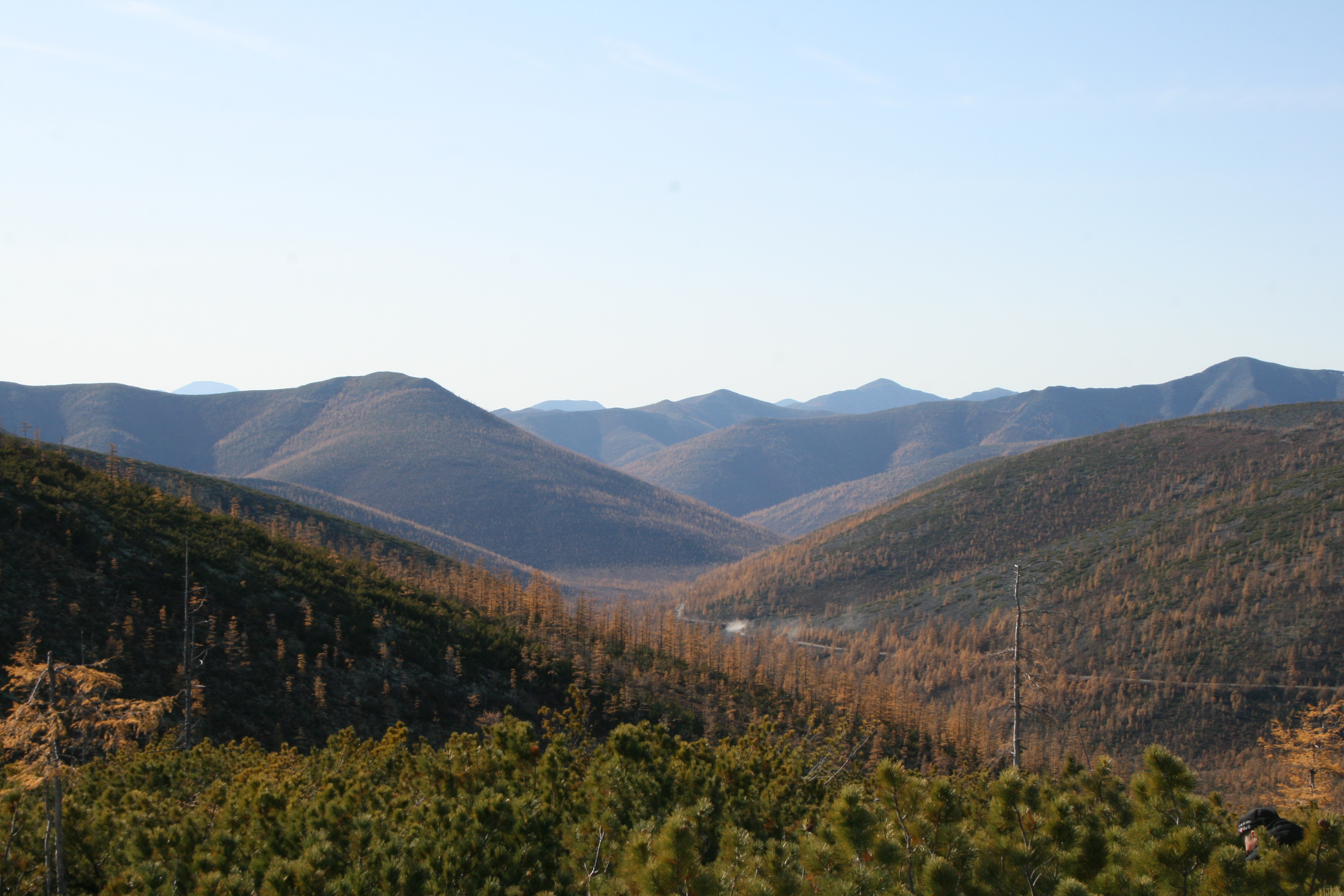
Burkhalinsky Pass as seen from the Susuman side

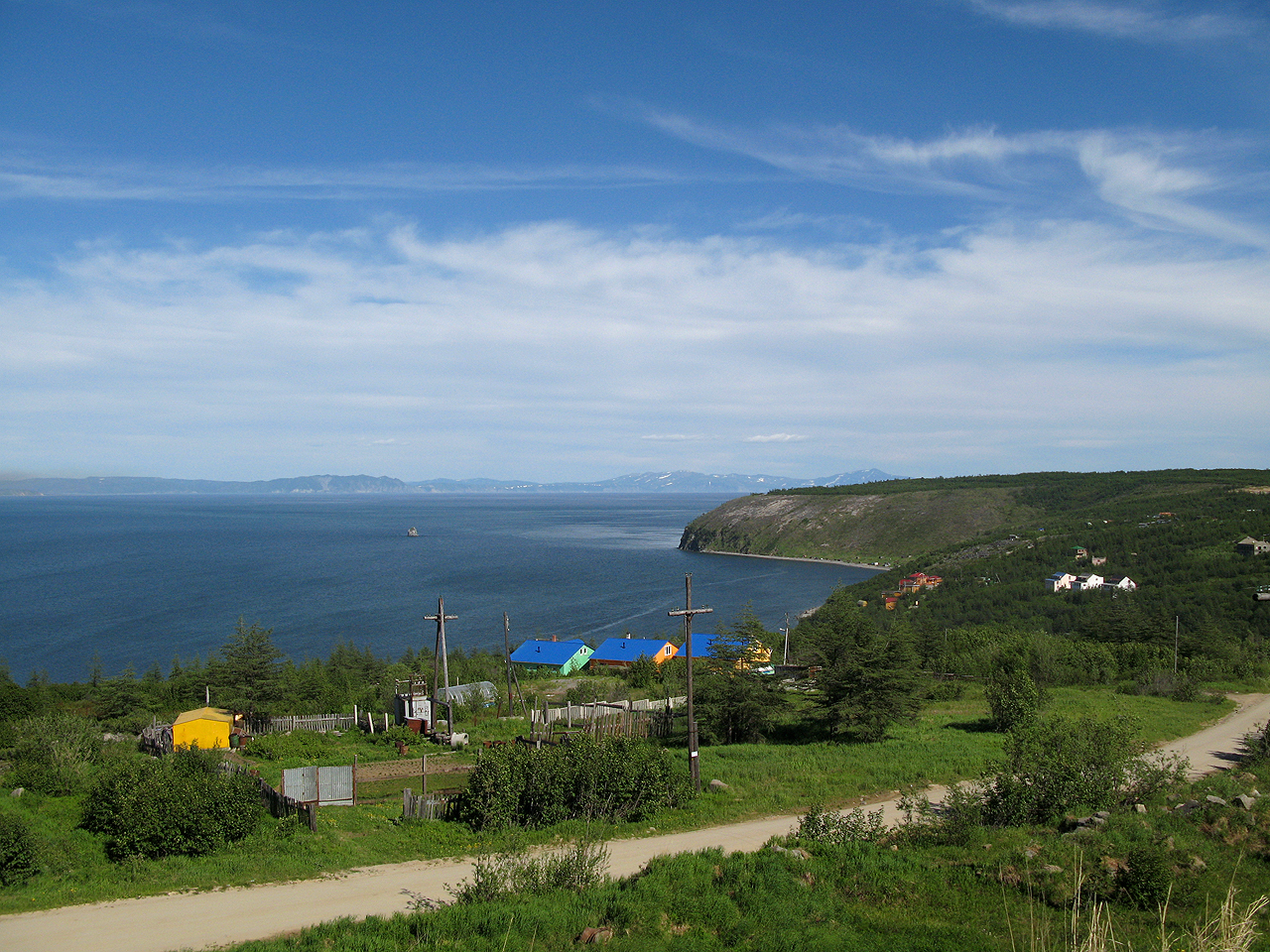
Gertner Bay, Magadan

Magadan Oblast consists principally of mountainous desert, tundra, and taiga. The southern part of the region is partly forested with birch, willow, mountain ash, larch and alder.

Inland there are mountain ranges belonging to the Kolyma Mountains, as well as the Chersky Range, including the Okhandya Range with the highest point of Magadan Oblast, an unnamed 2,337 metres (7,667 ft) high peak. There are a number of peninsulas along the oblast's coast, the chief ones being (north to south) the Taygonos Peninsula, Pyagina Peninsula, Koni Peninsula, Staritskogo Peninsula, Onatsevicha Peninsula, Khmitevskogo Peninsula and the Onara Peninsula.

The main islands of Magadan Oblast are (north to south) Telan Island, the Yam Islands, Zavyalov Island, Nedorazumeniya Island and the Spafaryev Islands.

=== Wildlife ===
The animal species in the south include snow sheep, reindeer, moose and brown bears. There are also many varieties of birds, including ducks and seabirds. Coastal waters of the Sea of Okhotsk host notable biodiversity where large vertebrates such as bowhead whales may appear, and have rich fishing grounds for pollock, herring, cod, flounder and salmon, as well as crabs and shellfish.

== Economy ==
The economy is centered on mining interests for gold, silver and other non-ferrous metals. The city of Magadan is the only large industrial center. Agriculture is not well developed in the region. In April 2014 the Russian government has endorsed bills for extending the operations of the Special Economic Zone (SEZ) in Magadan Oblast through to December 31, 2025.

=== Mining ===
Magadan Oblast is considered one of the world's richest mining areas. Gold is the region's main resource, although silver and tin deposits are also being developed. There are nearly 2,000 placer gold deposits, 100 gold ore deposits, and 48 silver ore deposits in the territory.

Recently, there has been interest in exploiting the coal resources in the region. In 2023, the East Mining Company reported that the Magadan Oblast may contain coal reserves exceeding 100 million tons. Over the medium term, there seem to be excellent opportunities for petroleum and natural gas exploitation.

=== Fishing ===
The fishing industry is the region's only food sector and is second in importance after mining. The 600,000 square kilometers (230,000 sq mi) area of the Sea of Okhotsk that borders on Magadan Oblast is one of the most productive regions of the world's oceans. Magadan Oblast has more than 15,900 kilometers (9,900 mi) of coastline and 29,016 kilometers (18,030 mi) of rivers of commercial importance. The catching vessels of the oblast's fishing companies operate mainly in Russia's economic zone, the Sea of Okhotsk and the Bering Sea, and to some extent in the Sea of Japan. Most of the catch comes from coastal waters. Fishing industry companies are concentrated in Magadan, Ola, Yamsk, and Evensk. The most important commercial fish are pollock, herring, cod, navaga (a member of the cod family), flounder, and various kinds of salmon. Crabs, squid, shrimp, and whelks are also caught.

=== Agriculture ===
Owing to the severe climate, agriculture is Magadan Region's least developed economic sector; as a result, 50% of all food products must be supplied from outside. The agricultural complex consists of companies producing agricultural products, the food and processing industries, a production infrastructure, and farm enterprises. The particular areas of specialization are reindeer herding, fur farming, and traditional hunting, fishing, and fur trapping activities. Companies involved in food processing and production include Gormolzavod, a distillery, a pasta factory, a sausage factory, the Dukcha state poultry farm, and the Khasynsky state farm.

=== Present situation ===
Despite rich natural resources, the economy has not prospered as much as might have been expected in recent years. The severe climate and poorly developed infrastructure are partly to blame, but the difficult transition from Soviet times has led to the collapse of a number of companies with the result that many inhabitants have left the region. Recently, there does seem to have been renewed efforts to encourage foreign investment which could lead to improvements in the economy. Indeed, on a visit to Magadan in November 2005, President Vladimir Putin supported the extension of special tax advantages for the region in order to encourage gold exploitation.

== Demographics ==
Population: 136,085 (2021 census); 156,996 (2010 census); 182,726 (2002 census); 542,868 (1989 Soviet census).

Historical population
Year	Pop.	±%
1926	6,000	—
1939	151,000	+2416.7%
1959	188,889	+25.1%
1970	251,297	+33.0%
1979	332,845	+32.5%
1989	385,340	+15.8%
2002	182,726	−52.6%
2010	156,996	−14.1%
2021	136,085	−13.3%
2025	134,202	−1.4%
Source: Census data, estimate

Vital statistics for 2024:

- Births: 1,009 (7.6 per 1,000)
- Deaths: 1,689 (12.7 per 1,000)

Total fertility rate (2024):
1.23 children per woman

Life expectancy (2021):
Total — 67.41 years (male — 62.48, female — 72.51)

=== Ethnic groups ===
Ethnicities in Magadan Oblast in 2021
Ethnicity	Population	Percentage
Russians	109,773	87.7%
Ukrainians	3,380	2.7%
Evens	2,062	1.6%
Uzbeks	904	0.7%
Koryaks	742	0.5%
Buryats	639	0.5%
Other Ethnicities	7,659	6.1%
Ethnicity not stated	10,926	–

=== Demographics for 2006 and later ===
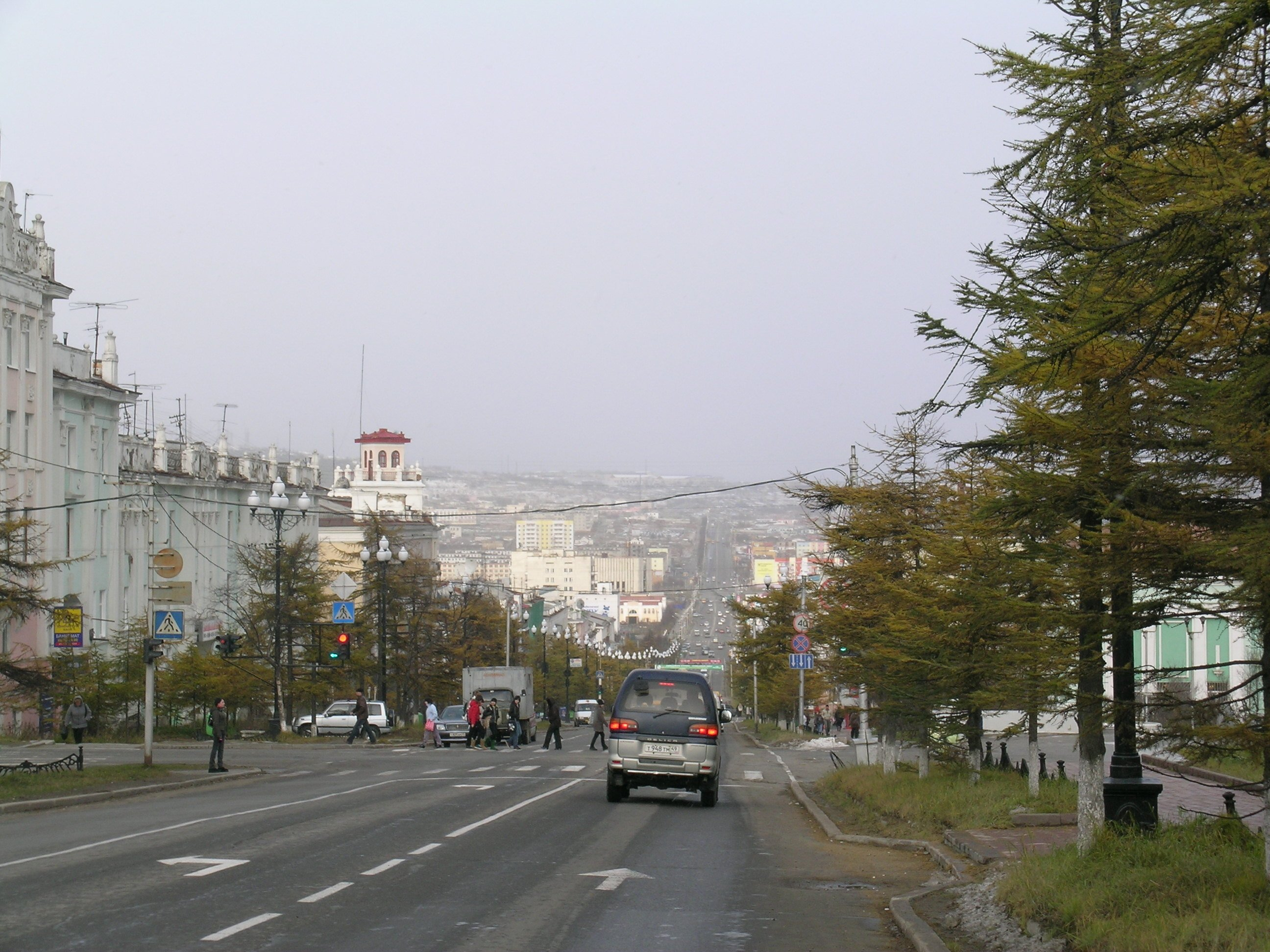
Magadan in 2008

Magadan is the federal subject with the highest rate of depopulation in the Russian Federation. Its population, which stood at 384,525 in 1991, stood at 165,820 on January 1, 2008 (according to the State Committee of the Russian Federation on Statistics), falling at a rate of around 2% per year. The rural population, which had stood at 59,151, was just 8,833 in 2008 and decreasing at a rate of around 10% per year. Entire villages are being emptied out and the population of the rural areas of the districts is simply disappearing. The rural population of Yagodninsky District was reduced from 13,843 (1991) to 445 (2007). The Omsukchansky District saw its rural population plummet from 1,301 to 79. Especially extreme is the example of Susumansky District, where the rural population almost disappeared: from 9,764 in 1991 to just 116 in 2007. Emigration is evident from the fact that for the 20–24 age group, there were only 66 females living in rural areas, compared to 202 males. Male life expectancy for rural areas rose to 53.73 years in 2006 from 51.88 in 2005. In 2021 the depopulation continues with approximately the same rate, as the population is about 139,000 people.

Although Magadan Oblast is a part of the program of resettlement of ethnic Russian families.

District	Population	Urban	Rural	Births	BR	Deaths	DR	NGR
Magadan Oblast	171,569	161,937	9,632	1820	10.70	2242	13.20	−0.25%
Magadan	107,265	107,265	0	1171	10.90	1292	12.10	−0.12%
Olsky District	11,463	7,917	3,546	124	10.90	192	16.90	−0.60%
Omsukchansky District	5,993	5,887	106	51	8.60	61	10.30	−0.17%
Severo-Evensky District	3,129	1,797	1,332	29	9.50	55	18.10	−0.86%
Srednekansky District	4,193	2,984	1,209	35	8.70	74	18.40	−0.97%
Susumansky District	11,166	10,952	214	101	9.30	132	12.20	−0.29%
Tenkinsky District	6,523	4,433	2,090	74	11.60	96	15.00	−0.34%
Khasynsky District	9,147	8,587	560	108	12.00	140	15.50	−0.35%
Yagodninsky District	12,690	12,115	575	127	10.40	200	16.30	−0.59%

=== Religion ===
Religion in Magadan Oblast as of 2012 (Sreda Arena Atlas)
Russian Orthodoxy	29.6%
Other Orthodox	3.2%
Old Believers	1%
Other Christians	4.2%
Islam	1%
Rodnovery and other native faiths	1.6%
Spiritual but not religious	27%
Atheism and irreligion	13.2%
Other and undeclared	19.2%

According to a 2012 survey 29.6% of the population of Magadan Oblast adheres to the Russian Orthodox Church, 3% are unaffiliated generic Christians, 3% is an Orthodox Christian believer without belonging to any church or adheres to other Orthodox churches, 2% of the population adheres to the Slavic native faith (Rodnovery) or to Siberian shamanism, 1% to Islam, 1% to the Old Believers. In addition, 27% of the population declares itself to be "spiritual but not religious", 13% is atheist, and 20.4% follows other religions or did not give an answer to the question.
