= De Nieuwe Wildernis =

- Theatrical release poster
- Directed by: Ruben Smit; Mark Verkerk
- Produced by: Ton Okkerse; Ignas van Schaick
- Narrated by: Harry Piekema
- Cinematography: Ruben Smit; Michael Sanderson
- Edited by: Niels Roza
- Music by: Bob Zimmerman
- Distributed by: Dutch FilmWorks
- Release date: 26 September 2013
- Running time: 97 minutes
- Country: Netherlands
- Language: Dutch

De Nieuwe Wildernis (English: The New Wilderness) is a 2013 Dutch natural history documentary film about the nature reserve Oostvaardersplassen in the Netherlands. The film shows animal life during four seasons, based on two years of filming in the reserve.

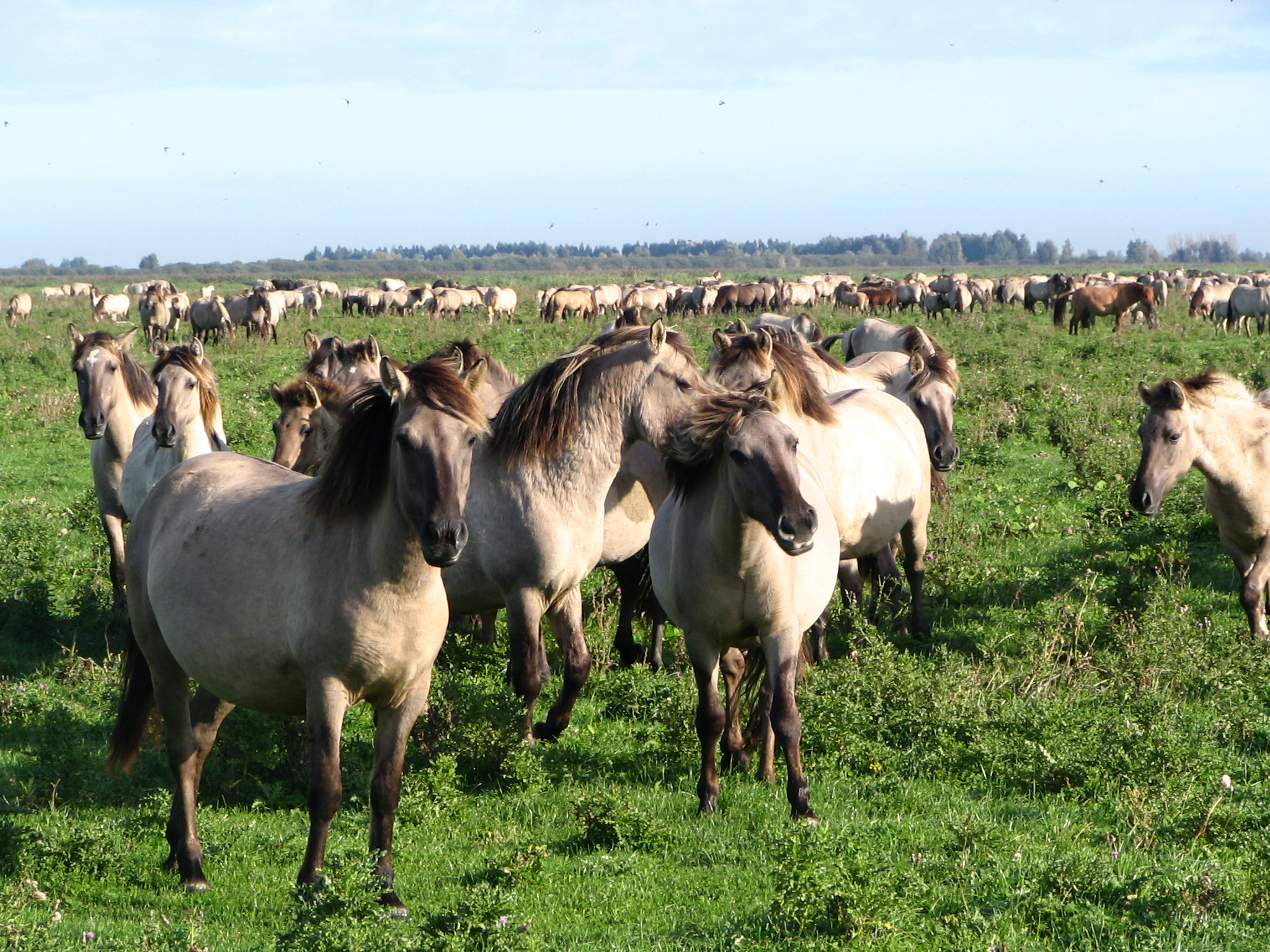
Wild koniks in the Oostvaardersplassen

== Animals ==
43 different animal species are being shown and also mentioned in the film, per class these are the following.

=== Mammals ===
- brown rat
- Eurasian beaver
- Konik horse
- red deer
- red fox

=== Birds ===
- barnacle goose
- bearded reedling
- bluethroat
- common buzzard
- common kingfisher
- common nightingale
- common raven
- common reed bunting
- common starling
- Eurasian bittern
- European goldfinch
- Eurasian spoonbill
- European robin
- great cormorant
- great crested grebe
- great egret
- greylag goose
- little grebe
- mute swan
- Savi's warbler
- sedge warbler
- water rail
- western yellow wagtail
- white-tailed eagle

=== Amphibians ===
- common frog
- natterjack toad

=== Fish ===
- common carp

=== Insects ===
- ant
- aphid
- blowfly
- Colletes cunicularius
- green-veined white
- ladybird beetle
- large earth bumblebee
- Ranatra linearis
- small cabbage white
- yellow dung fly

=== Branchiopods ===
- water flea

== Awards ==
- Film Poster Award (2013) at the Netherlands Film Festival
- Golden Film (2013) for 100,000 visitors
- Platinum Film (2013) for 400,000 visitors
- Rembrandt Award for Best Dutch Film (2014)
- Golden Calf for Best Popular Film (2014) at the Netherlands Film Festival
