= Michael Sanderson =

British-Dutch wildlife filmmaker

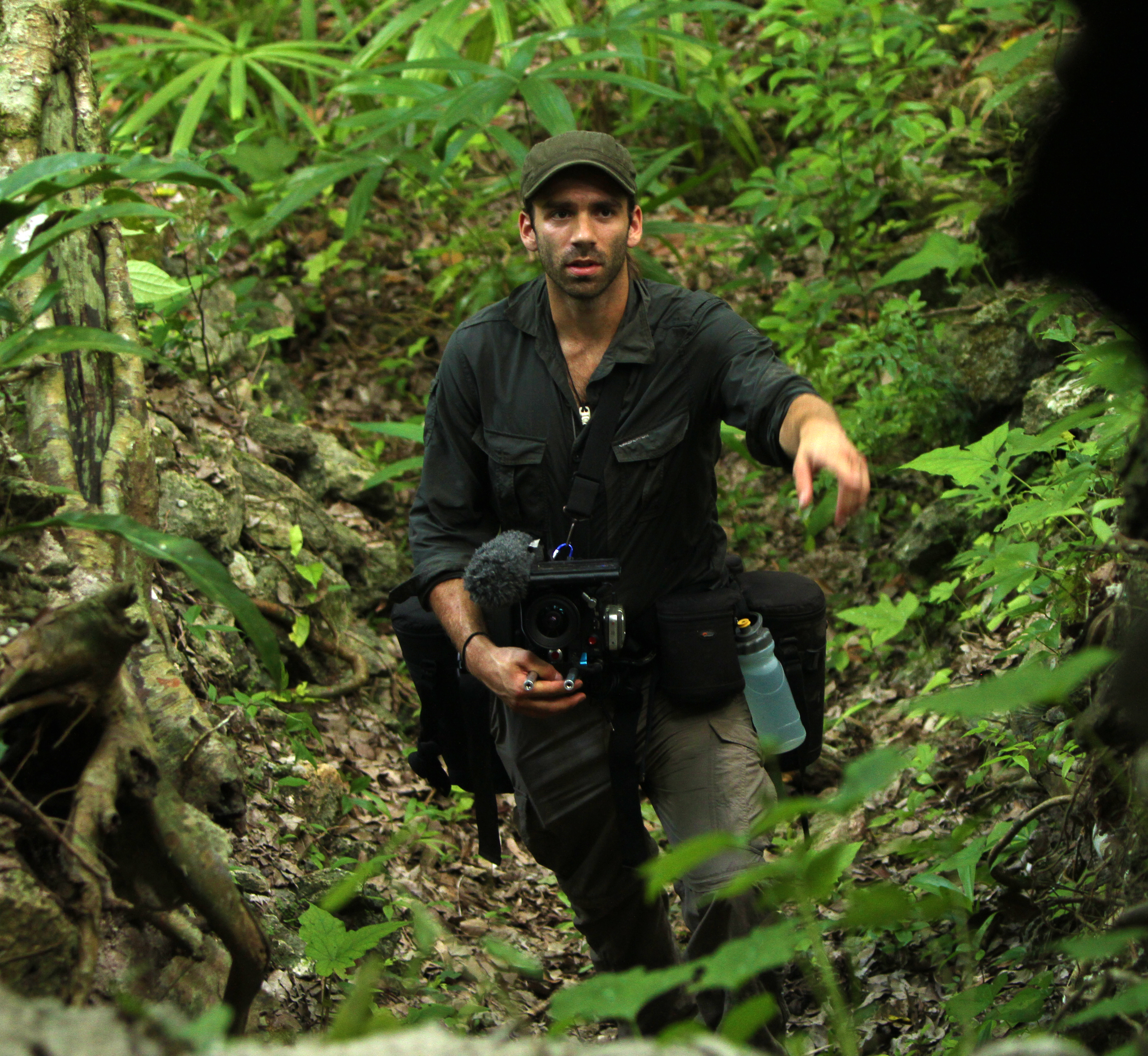
- Michael Sanderson in Guatemala 2013.
- Born: Michael John Sanderson; March 20, 1983; Wassenaar, Netherlands
- Other name: Michael J. Sanderson
- Occupations: Wildlife Filmmaker and Cameraman
- Website: www.ateles.org

Michael John Sanderson (born 20 March 1983) is a British-Dutch wildlife filmmaker.

He started his career in Bristol on the award-winning BBC series Smalltalk Diaries (2008) as cameraman.

One of his first independent projects as a Producer and Director of Photography (2009–2010) was a film about the Eurasian wolf in Chernobyl (Ukraine and Belarus) for the television channels ORF/NDR/PBS/BBC. During this project, he pioneered filming in Ultra High Definition (4K resolution) and was one of the first to build and use multi-rotor video drones for aerial images for EFP and wildlife film productions.

In the Netherlands, Sanderson's cinematography can be found in De Nieuwe Wildernis (2013), which was number one in the Dutch box office and is still the biggest Dutch nature film for cinema ever; in Holland: Natuur in de Delta (2015) for which Sanderson filmed the closing sequences and the specialist macro using lenses he built himself; and De Wilde Stad (2018) which he filmed, in high speed, the scene of a peregrine falcon hunting and the emotional scene of ducklings jumping for the first time from their rooftop nest to the canals of Amsterdam.

Sanderson produced multiple wildlife documentaries for NHK which include The Paternal Bond: Barbary Macaques (2015) which is about the Barbary Macaque in Morocco's Atlas Mountains; Pyrenees Mountain (2017), which is about the endangered Bearded Vulture in Spain; and the Japanese re-versioning of A Wild Fox Life (2019).

Sanderson has filmed extensively in Latin America for Planet Earth II, BBC Natural World Jungle Animal Hospital and for his independent Ateles Films production, which was aired worldwide including Nat Geo WILD and Arte, called Return of the Spider Monkeys (2016) narrated by Hayley Atwell and follows the life of an orphaned spider monkey called Infinity after she is released back into the jungle of Guatemala. For this film, Sanderson learned how to climb into the canopy alongside the spider monkeys of the Mayan jungle to film their intimate lives from a tree top perspective.

Recent work includes, A Wild Fox Life (2019) which was shot in the Netherlands and follows the life of a red fox that lives in the Oostvaardersplassen nature reserve on the reclaimed polder province of Flevoland.

Sanderson founded Ateles Films in 2013, where he also serves as an executive producer and cinematographer for their wildlife film productions, together with his business partner.

== Education ==
He studied Broadcast Systems Engineering (1st class BSc) at Solent University in Southampton and an MA in Documentary Filmmaking at Royal Holloway, University of London

== Filmography ==
=== Films ===
Year	Title	Role	Format
2005	Wolves of Lusatia	cinematographer	Documentary
2008	Smalltalk Diaries	cameraman	TV series
2013	De Nieuwe Wildernis	cinematographer	Cinema Film
2013	Living on the Edge	cinematographer	TV series
2015	The Paternal Bond: Barbary Macaques	cinematographer	TV documentary
2015	Holland: Natuur in de Delta	cinematographer	Cinema Film
2016	Mind of a Giant	cameraman	TV documentary
2016	Jungle Animal Hospital	cameraman	TV series
2016	Planet Earth II	cinematographer	TV series
2016	Return of the Spider Monkeys	cinematographer	TV documentary
2017	All the Wild Horses	cinematographer	Feature Documentary
2017	Mosquito	cameraman	TV documentary
2017	Pyrenees Mountain, Lammergeier, the bone Crashers, Soar up High above the Mountains	cinematographer	TV documentary
2017	Darwin's amazing animals: Barbary Macaque	cinematographer	TV series
2018	De Wilde Stad (aka. Wild Amsterdam)	cinematographer	Cinema Film
2019	A Wild Fox Life	cinematographer	TV documentary
2020	Spider Monkey for Sale	director	Micro Movie
2021	Hidden Nature of Holland - Fox and Rabbit: Battle of the Sandy Land	cinematographer	TV documentary
2023	Darwin's Amazing Animals: Netherland's Great Reclaimed Land	cinematographer	TV series

== Awards ==
Year	Festival	Category	Nominated work	Result
2020	Green Screen Naturfilmfestival: International Wildlife Film Festival (Germany)	Audience Award Best Short Film	Spider Monkey for Sale	Nominated
2020	World Wildlife Day Showcase (USA)	Micro Movie	Spider Monkey for Sale	Honorable Mention
2018	Mariupol International Film Festival Cinema and YOU (Ukraine)	Best Documentary (Professionals)	Return of the Spider Monkeys	Winner
2018	Woods Hole Film Festival (United States of America)	Best Cinematography (Feature Film)	All the Wild Horses	Winner
2017	Baikal International Festival of Documentary and Popular-Science Films (Russia)	Special Mention Award	Return of the Spider Monkeys	Winner
2017	British Academy Television Awards (UK)	Huw Wheldon Award for Specialist Factual	Planet Earth II (Series)	Winner
2017	British Academy Television Craft Awards (UK)	Best Photography - Factual	Planet Earth II (Episode "Jungles")	Nominated
2017	TCA Awards	Outstanding Achievement in News and Information	Planet Earth II (Series)	Nominated
2017	Primetime Creative Arts Emmy Awards	Outstanding Documentary or Nonfiction Series	Planet Earth II (Series)	Winner
2017	Baikal International Festival of Documentary and Popular-Science Films (Russia)	Special Mention Award	Return of the Spider Monkeys	Winner
2017	Green Screen Naturfilmfestival: International Wildlife Film Festival (Germany)	Audience Award	Planet Earth (Episode Jungles)	Nominated
2017	Green Screen Naturfilmfestival: International Wildlife Film Festival (Germany)	Best Newcomer	Return of the Spider Monkeys	Nominated
2017	Finisterra VI Arrabida Film Art & Tourism Festival (Portugal)	Best Cinematography	Return of the Spider Monkeys	Winner
2017	Finisterra VI Arrabida Film Art & Tourism Festival (Portugal)	Best Documentary	Return of the Spider Monkeys	Runner up
2017	Finisterra VI Arrabida Film Art & Tourism Festival (Portugal)	Best Wildlife & Nature Tourism	Return of the Spider Monkeys	2nd Runner up
2014	Rembrandt Award (Netherlands)	Best Film	De Nieuwe Wildernis	Winner
2014	Gouden Kalf (Netherlands)	Public Prize	De Nieuwe Wildernis	Winner
2009	Green Screen Naturfilmfestival: International Wildlife Film Festival (Germany)	Children's Audience Award	Smalltalk Diaries	Winner
2008	Wildscreen Panda (United Kingdom)	Best Series & Best Innovation	Smalltalk Diaries	Winner
2008	Chicago International Children's Film Festival (United States)	Best Live Action Award	Smalltalk Diaries	Winner

== Lectures ==
Michael Sanderson has been invited as a guest lecture to several events: 2013 for CineMec at “Master Class De Nieuwe Wildernis”; 2014 for Institute Beeld & Geluid at “Inspiration Day – Leren met Natuurbeelden”; 2015 for University of Porto for “Seminar – Open Class“; 2017 for NHL Stenden University for the event “Guest lecture by: Michael Sanderson“; for "Nederlandse Filmacademie Amsterdamse Hogeschool voor de Kunsten" for “BA Cinematography" and also during the Drone World Expo on the panel "Aerial Artistry: Exceptional Film and Television” in Silicon Valley.

== Books ==
- The Drone Camera Handbook, Aurum Press Lta, 2017. ISBN 1781316066.
