= Oostvaardersplassen =

Nature reserve in the Netherlands

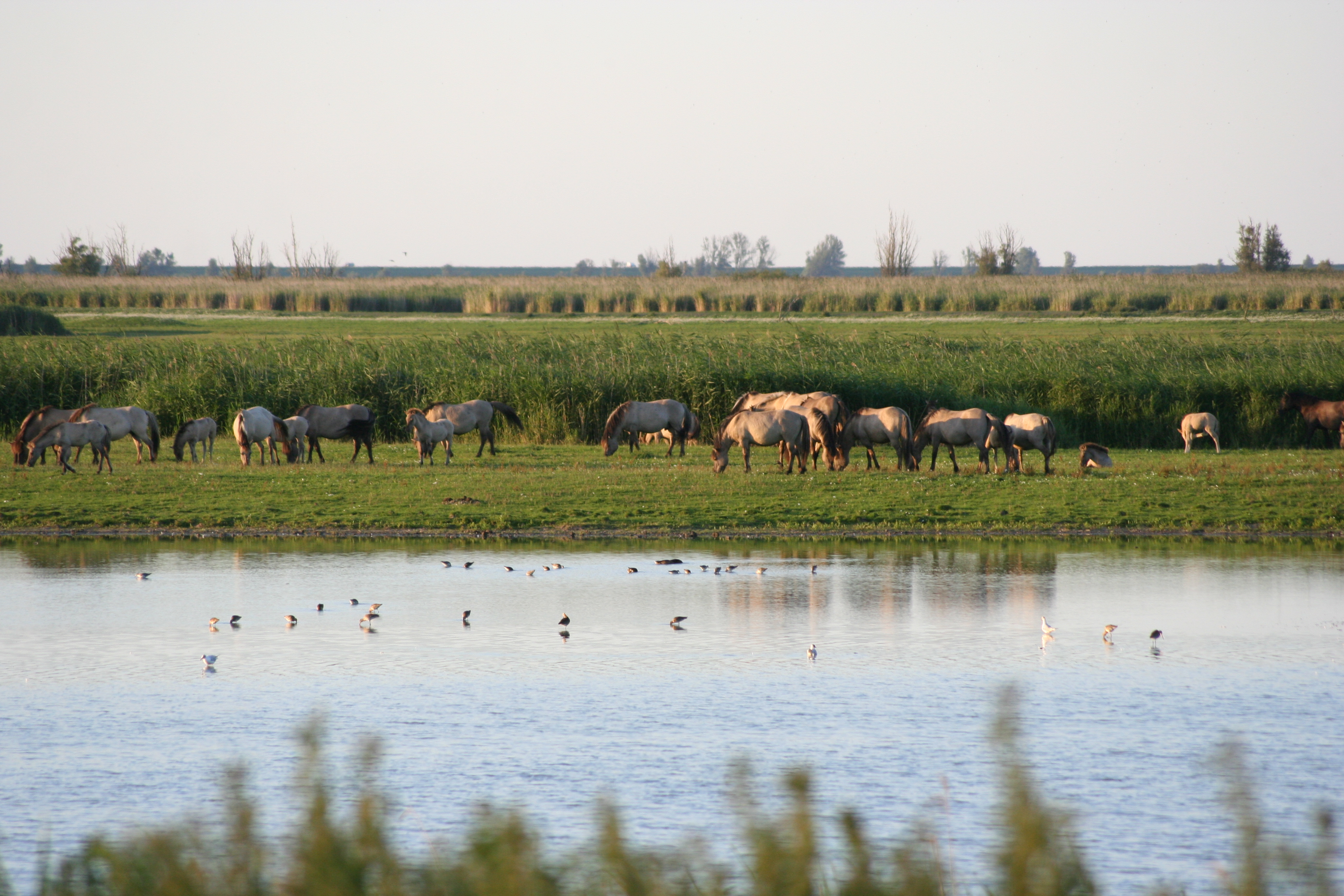
- Konik ponies in the Oostvaardersplassen

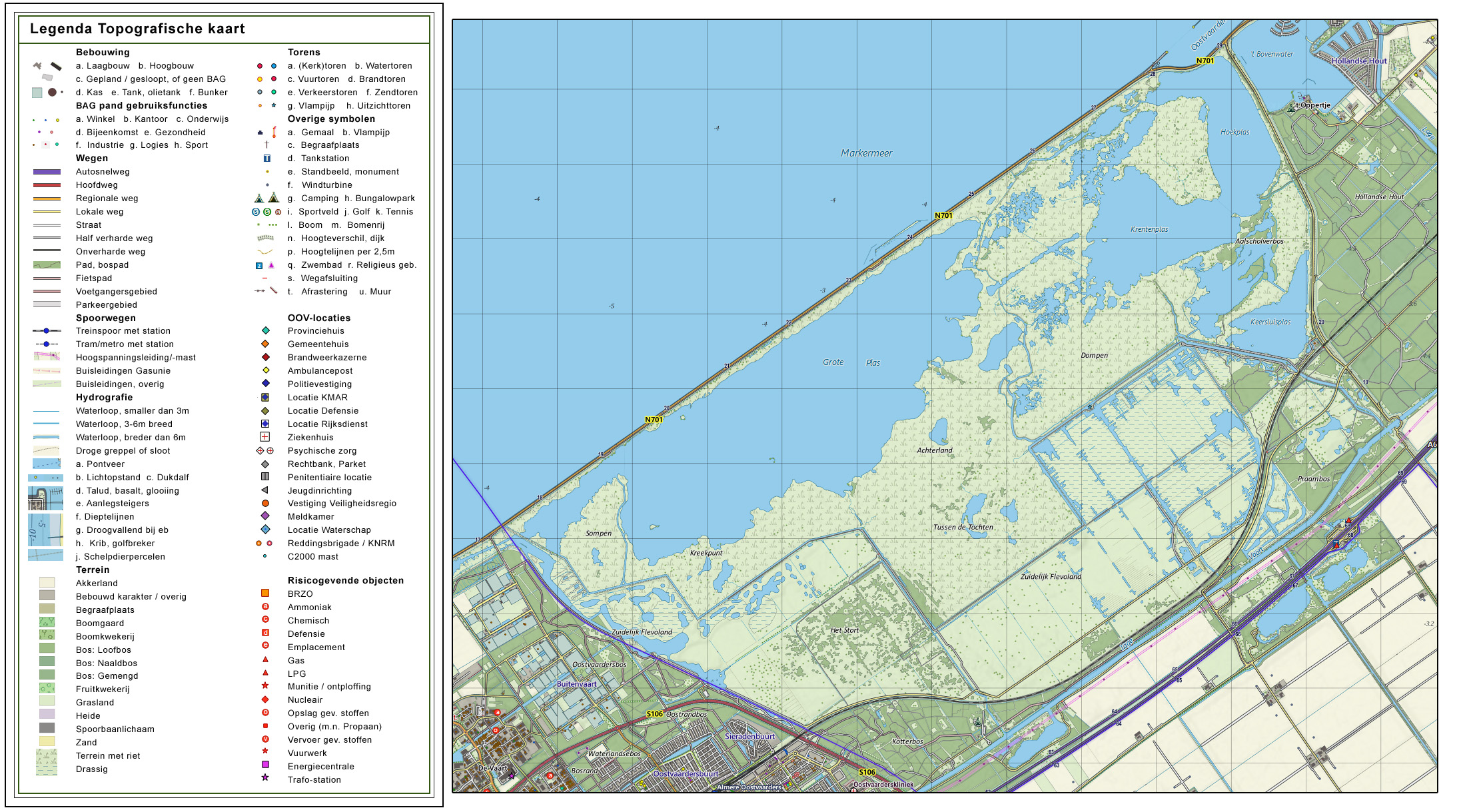
- Geographical map of the Oostvaardersplassen
- Location: Flevoland, the Netherlands
- Nearest city: Lelystad
- Coordinates: 52°27′N 5°22′E
- Area: 56 km^{2} (22 sq mi)

Ramsar Wetland
- Designated: 2 June 1989
- Reference no.: 427

The Oostvaardersplassen (Dutch pronunciation: [oːstˈfaːrdərsˌplɑsə(n)]) is a nature reserve in Flevoland, the Netherlands, managed by the Staatsbosbeheer (state forestry service). Covering about 56 square kilometres (22 sq mi) in the province of Flevoland, it is an experiment in rewilding. It is in a publicly owned polder created in 1968. The land was reclaimed from the sea and was originally intended for industrial development, but was found to be unsuitable for cultivation. The site was then abandoned and greylag geese began inhabiting the area. Frans Vera, a Dutch biologist, was the principal investigator of the Oostvaardersplassen starting in the late 1970s. By 1989, its ecological interest had resulted in its being declared a Ramsar wetland. It became part of Nieuw Land National Park when that was established in 2018.

== Geography ==
The Oostvaardersplassen is located in the municipality of Lelystad, between the towns of Lelystad and Almere, in the province of Flevoland in the Netherlands, just north of Amsterdam. The area of 56 km^{2} (22 sq mi) is situated on the shore of the Markermeer in the center of the Flevopolder. The Oostvaardersplassen can be divided into a wet area in the northwest and a dry area in the southeast.

== Wet and dry areas ==
In the wet area along the Markermeer, there are large reedbeds on clay, where greylag geese often feed. Oostvaardersplassen is also a Special Protection Area for birdlife, such as the great cormorant, common spoonbill, great egret, white-tailed eagle, Eurasian bittern, common kingfisher, grey heron, common raven, barnacle goose, little egret, Savi's warbler, bearded reedling, Red kite, Pied avocet, and European robin among many other animals, such as the European red fox, and Nicrophorus vespillo burying beetle.

Before the establishment of the reserve, the dry area was a nursery for willow trees, and in the first year hundreds of seedlings could be found on each square metre. This led to concern that a dense woodland would develop, significantly reducing the value of the habitat for water birds. To avoid this, the park's managers brought in a number of large herbivores to keep the area more open, including Konik horses, red deer and Heck cattle. These large grazing animals are kept out in the open all year round without supplemental feeding for the winter and early spring, and are allowed to behave as wild animals (without, for example, for now, castrating males). Allowing grazing animals had caused the vegetation of the Oostvaardersplassen to become stress-tolerant, low in stature, and more open and homogenous with a higher species richness as compared to areas that are left ungrazed. The ecosystem developing under their influence is thought to resemble those that would have existed on European river banks and deltas before human disturbance. However, there is some controversy about how natural the ecosystem is because it is a fenced in area with limited space, there are currently no wildlife corridors to connect the reserve to other places, it has a pumping station to control and prevent floods, and the area lacks large predators to keep the large numbers of herbivores in check, such as the Eurasian wolf, Eurasian brown bear and Eurasian lynx.

== Large herbivores ==
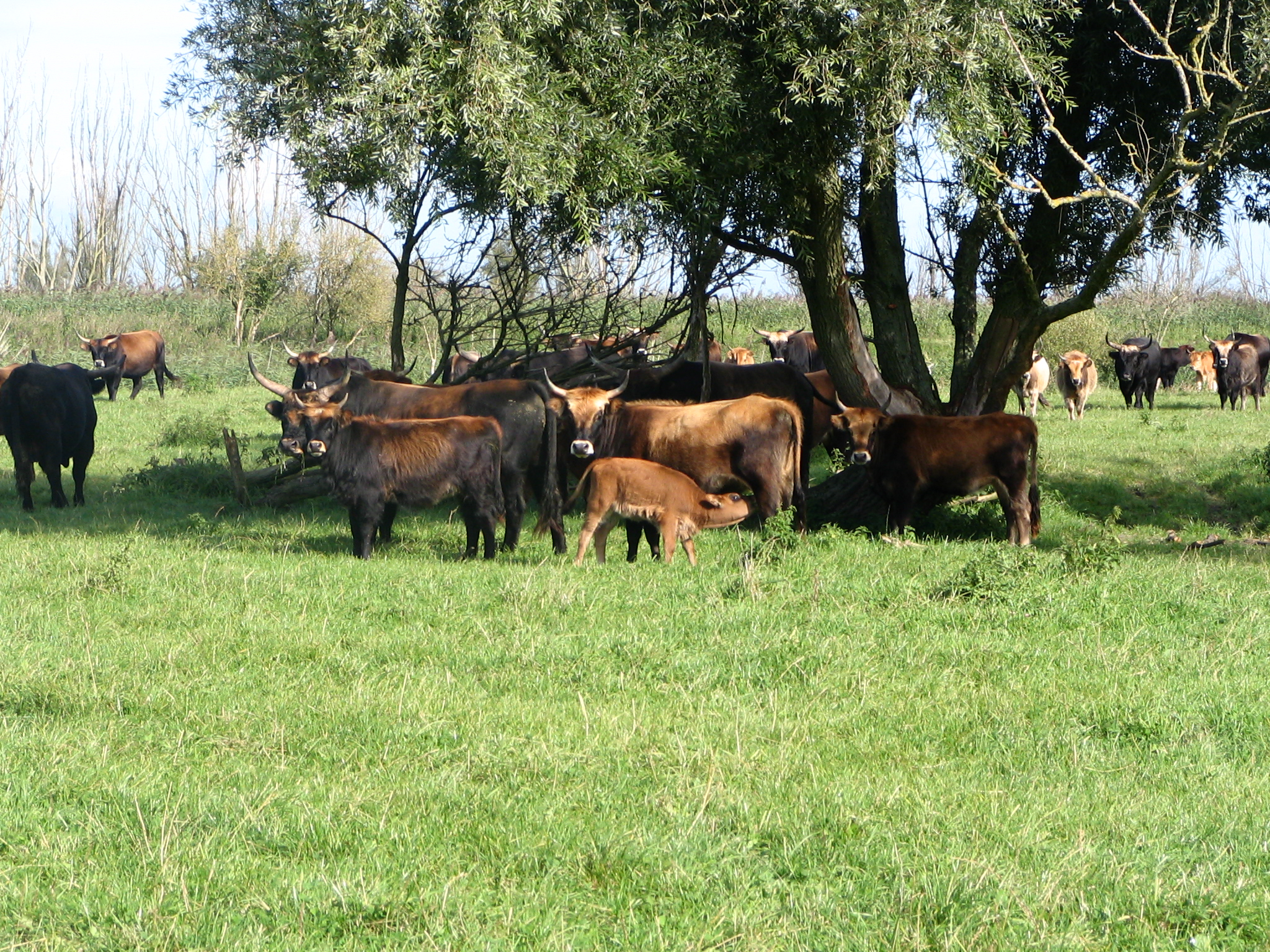
Heck cattle

Before they were driven to extinction, large herbivores in this part of Europe included the tarpan (wild horse), wisent (European bison), red deer and aurochs (wild cattle). The tarpan and aurochs are extinct, but Konik ponies and Heck cattle are able to act as functional equivalents, occupying a similar ecological niche. Hans Heck and Lutz Heck replaced the aurochs with selectively-bred Heck cattle that was introduced in the 1920's. Heck cattle fill similar roles as aurochs and resemble them, but are slightly smaller. The only native large herbivores now missing from Oostvaardersplassen are the elk (Alces alces), the roe deer "formerly present in the park", the wild boar and the wisent. There is a chance that the wild boar will find its way naturally from the Veluwe.

Head count	2010	2011
Red deer	2,200–2,800	3,300
Konik ponies	1,090	1,150
Heck cattle	320	350
Roe deer	30–40	n/a

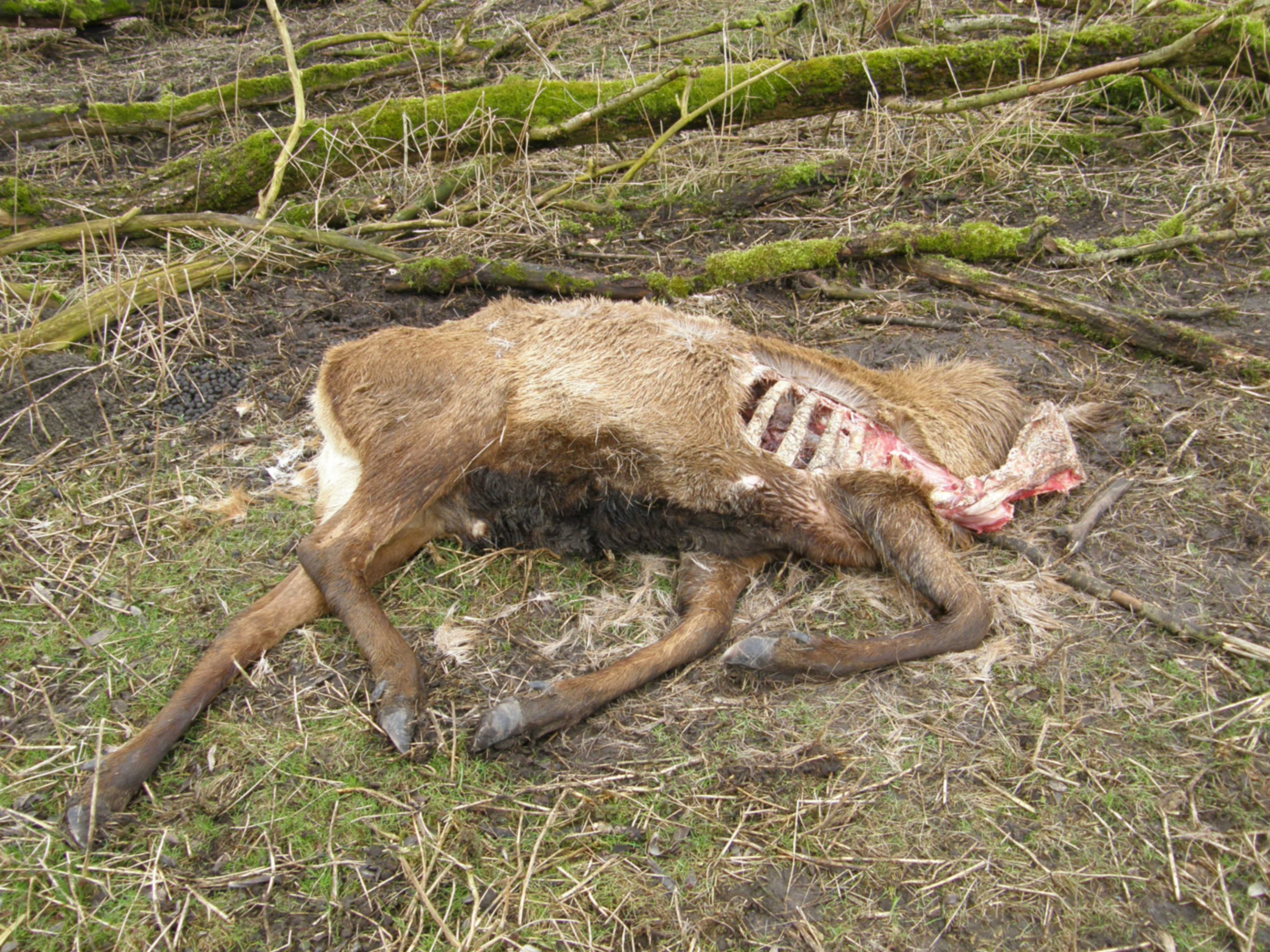
Carcass of deer that had been shot because it was too weak to survive the winter

=== Management ===
The reserve is the subject of decades of management reports and protests against the large reported number of grazers dying by starvation or shot to death, while the animals are kept behind a fence and cannot migrate. During a particularly harsh winter in 2005, many animals in the Oostvaardersplassen died of starvation, leading to public outcry against alleged animal cruelty and leading to the culling strategy. In the winter of 2017–2018, almost 3,300 deer, horses and cattle starved to death dividing the Dutch public and leading to demonstrations and individuals feeding hay to the animals despite police arrests. Because the Oostvaardersplassen is a man-made wilderness experiment, the large herbivores are expected to survive independently without any human intervention such as feeding, breeding, or vaccination.

The Province asked the Van Geel Commission to write a policy which was presented in April and approved on 11 July 2018. This Van Geel report advised to manage the terrain instead of rewilding. The consequence is a reduction of the numbers of remaining animals either by replacing or shooting which led to another outburst of protests and court cases.

Mass mortalities were likely also caused by failure to connect the reserve to the Veluwe nearby due to conflicts with farmers and a lack of political support, abandonment of OostvaardersWold due to political transition, and failure to introduce large predators.

== Further development ==
In many ways the Oostvaardersplassen is an isolated area; it is in a polder with no previous history and there are currently no wildlife corridors connecting it to other nature reserves. The "Ecological Main Structure" plan proposes connections between nature reserves in the Netherlands, calling for a corridor to be created toward the nearby Horsterwold forest near Zeewolde. The resulting network, called Oostvaardersland, would be part of Natura 2000, the European-wide network of habitats to which Oostvaardersplassen belongs. The creation of Oostvaardersland will allow seasonal small scale migration and take some strain off the big grazers in winter. In the summer, Oostvaardersplassen will offer rich grazing and the sea winds will keep biting insects at bay, in the winter, the Horsterwold will offer protection from cold winds and supply browse. Oostvaardersland will comprise a total area of 150 km^{2} (58 sq mi). Furthermore, there is an option for a connection to the Veluwe forest. Eventually this could allow wild animals to move to and from Germany.

Oostvaardersland was expected to be finished by 2014. However, the project ran into financial and political troubles. In 2012 the creation of OostvaardersWold, the 18 km^{2} (6.9 sq mi) connecting corridor between Oostvaardersplassen and the Horsterwold, was stopped, and four members of the regional parliament resigned. The government then planned to sell back the property to the previous owners for less money than it originally paid for the property; according to European nature laws it would then have to turn other lands into wilderness areas to compensate for the loss of the OostvaardersWold nature area. In 2018, the Oostvaardersplassen rewilding experiment was terminated due to public backlash from the mass deaths of the herbivores.

As above-mentioned, the plan to connect to the De Hoge Veluwe National Park in Gelderland also failed.

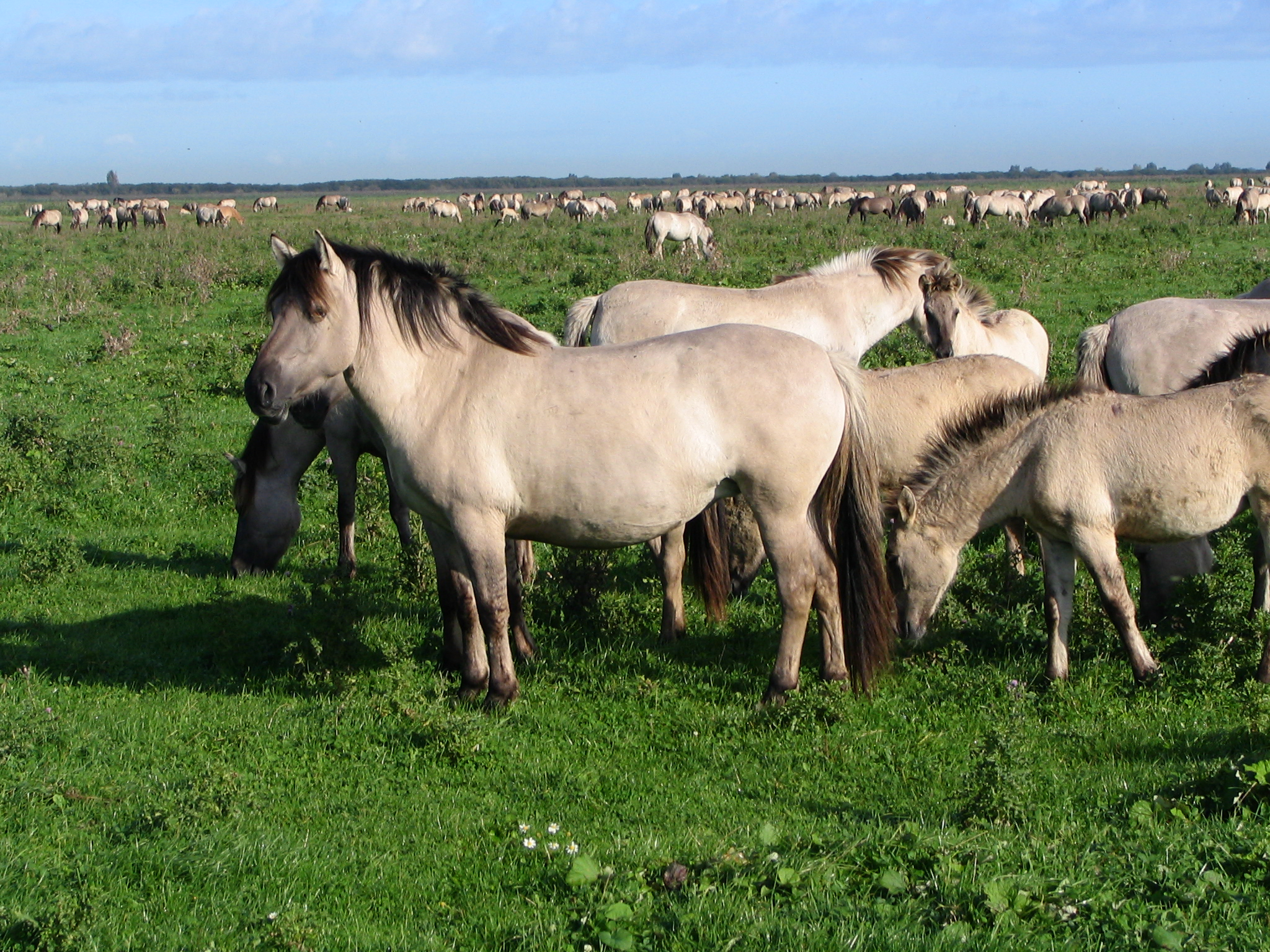
Konik ponies

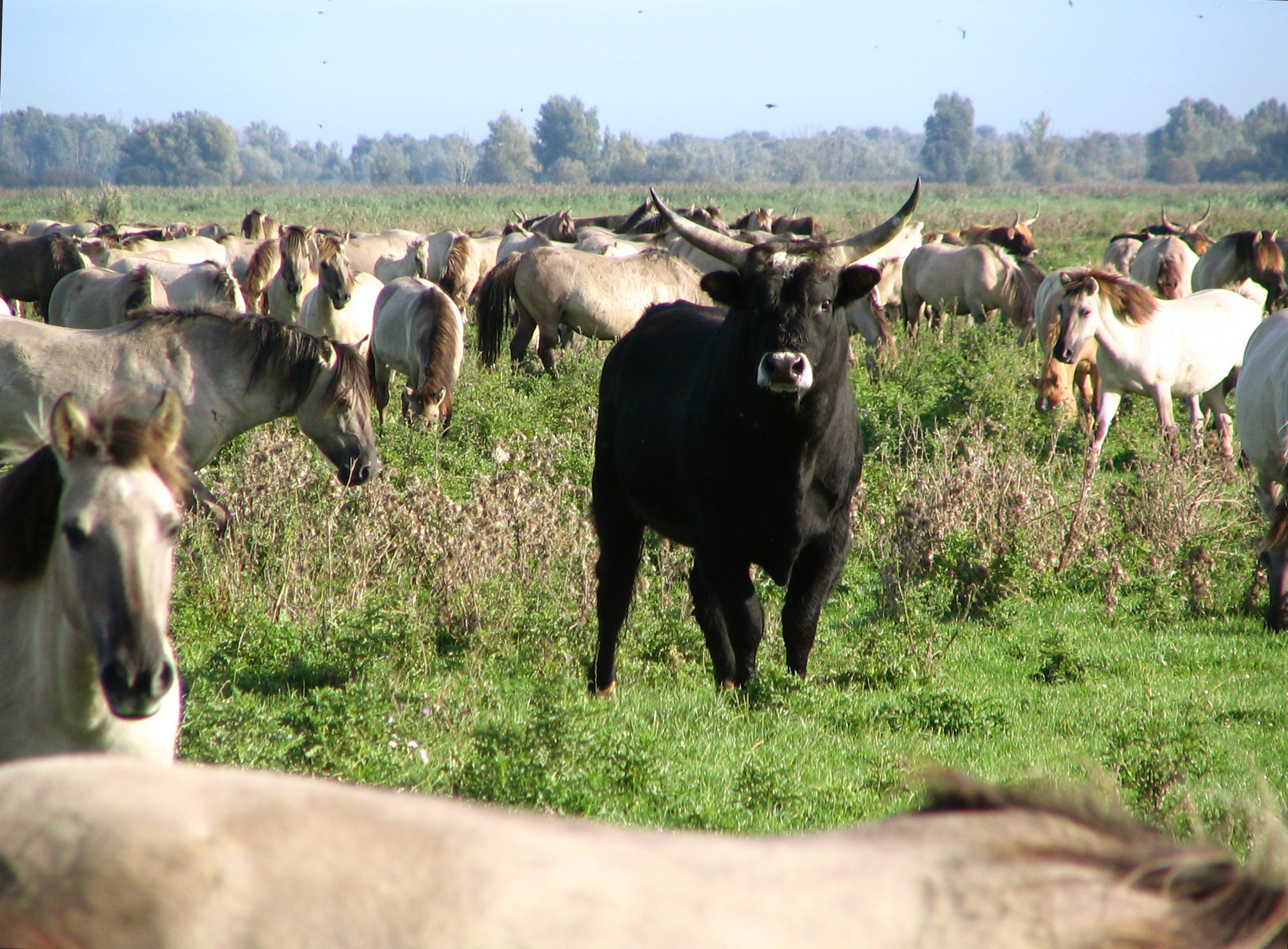
A Heck bull amongst a herd of Konik ponies

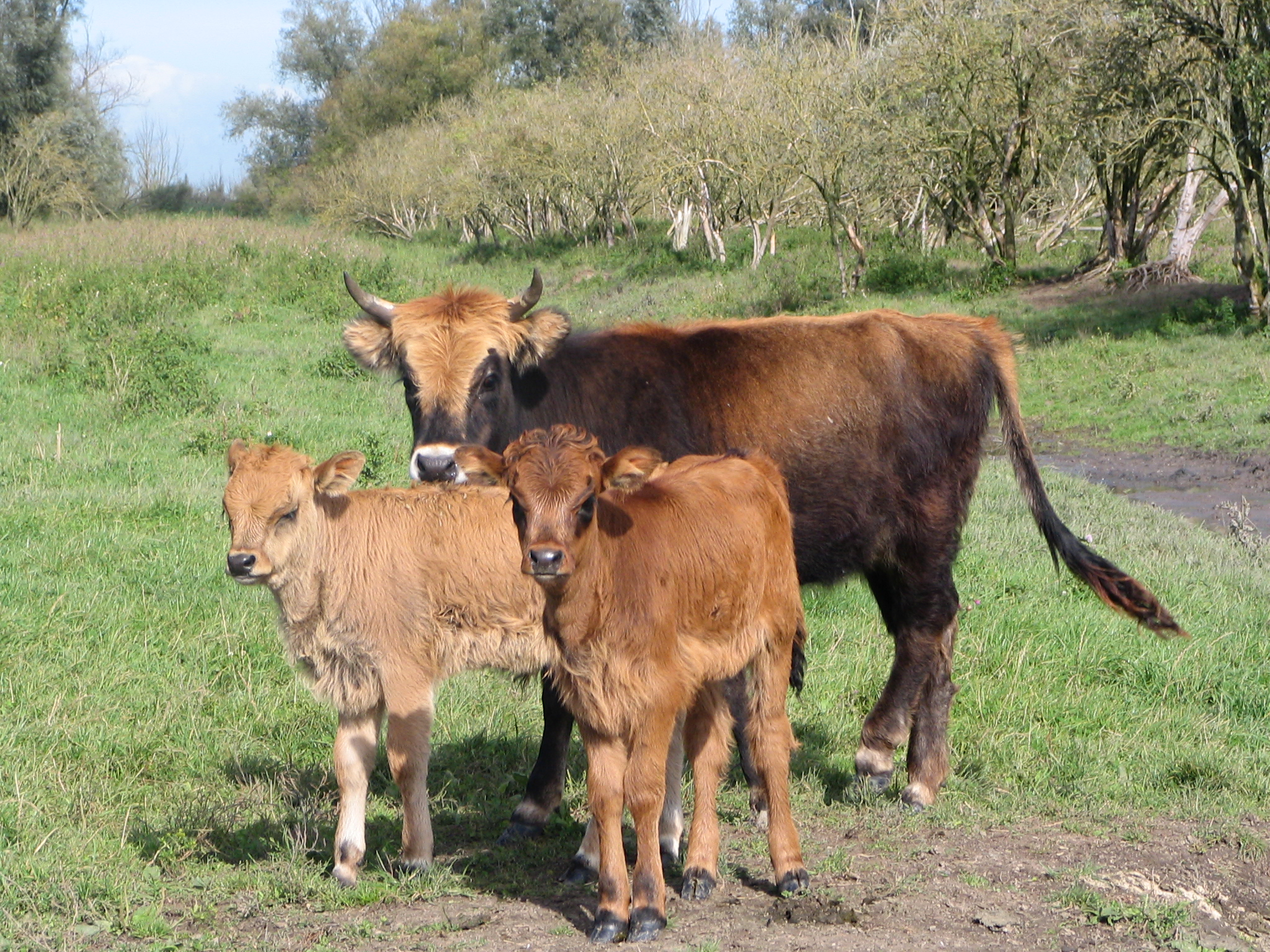
Young Heck cow with calves

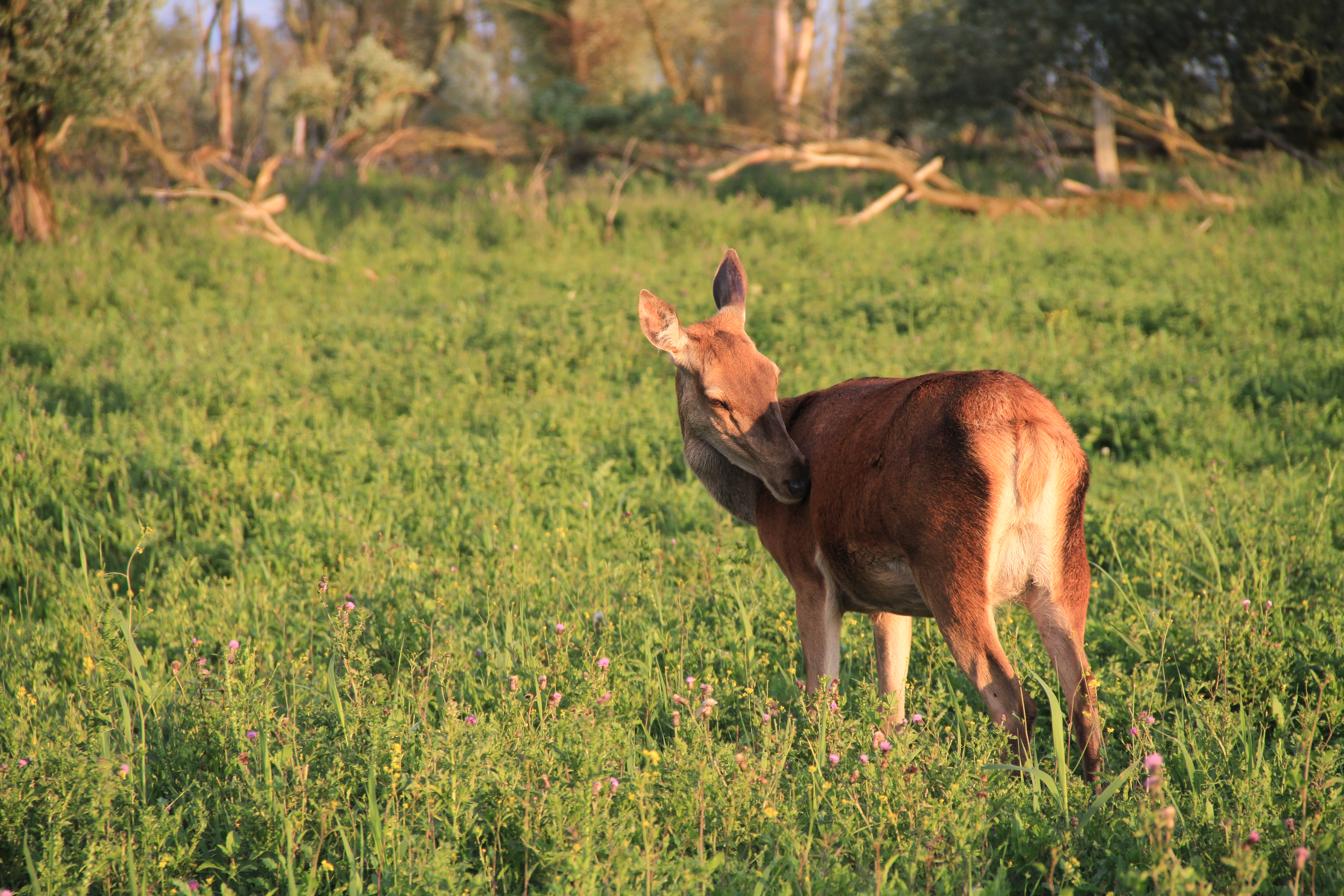
A red deer

== See also ==
- De Nieuwe Wildernis, a 2013 Dutch natural history documentary film
- Pleistocene Park
- Wood-pasture hypothesis
