= Gennady Romanenko =

Ukrainian entrepreneur and author

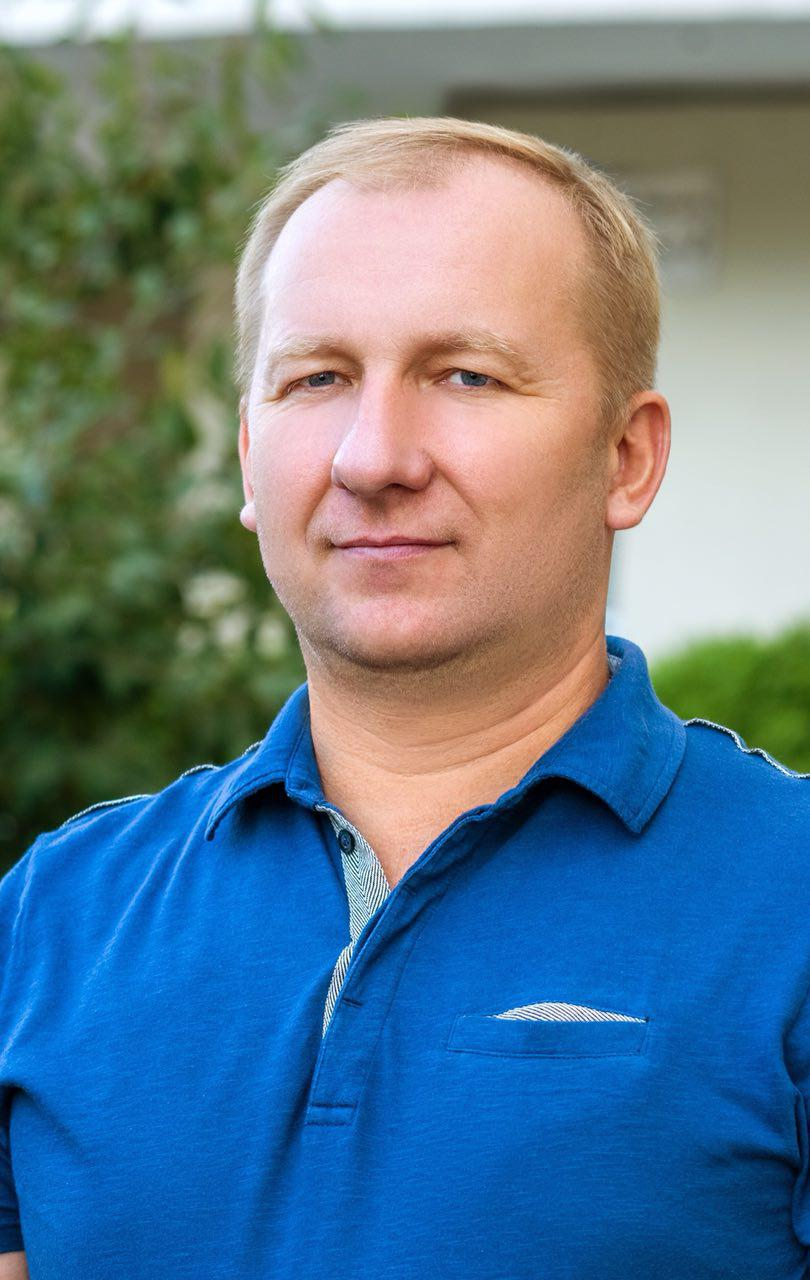
- Born: January 12, 1969 (age 57); Karabelivka, Vinnytsia Oblast, Ukraine

Gennady Romanenko is a Ukrainian entrepreneur, sociocultural projects initiator, and author.

His book Karabelіvka. The Land of Our Ancestors - the Land of Our Heirs was nominated for the Ukrainian Book of the Year award, an annual literary award by the President of Ukraine.

Prior to 2015, Romanenko was on board of the State Fiscal Service of Ukraine and the National Security and Defense Council of Ukraine.

== Biography ==
Romanenko graduated from the Taras Shevchenko National University of Kyiv, degree - Ph.D. in Law.

In the late 1980s he became known in the professional community as an antiques collector.

In 1991–97 he was engaged in foreign trade.

In 1997–2014 Romanenko extensively worked in state agencies. Namely, he was the head of customs offices in several regions of Ukraine, twice in Kyiv. In different periods, Romanenko was an advisor to the chairmen of the State Fiscal Service. He also worked in the National Security and Defense Council of Ukraine.

In an interview in 2015, Romanenko noted that reforms in the customs agencies had always met tremendous resistance.

Since 2015 he is engaged in agribusiness, as well as consults foreign economic relations.

Romanenko is actively developing sociocultural projects, including the revival of the relic Ukrainian horse breed.

=== Karabelіvka. The land of Our Ancestors - the Land of Our Heirs ===
Gennady Romanenko is the author of the book Karabelіvka. The land of Our Ancestors - the Land of Our Heirs, devoted to the history of his native village in Vinnytsia oblast of Ukraine. The book was published by the Rodovid Press in 2015.

After its publication the book aroused considerable interest in the academic and museum communities of Ukraine. A panel on the book was done during the V International Scientific Conference Oral history research: current trends, directions and perspectives. State historical museums included the book on Karabelivka into their libraries' lists.

In 2016, the State Committee for Television and Radio Broadcasting of Ukraine put Romanenko's book into competition for Ukrainian Book of the Year Presidential Award, in the category "For contribution to the development of Ukrainian Studies".

=== Hucul breed revival ===
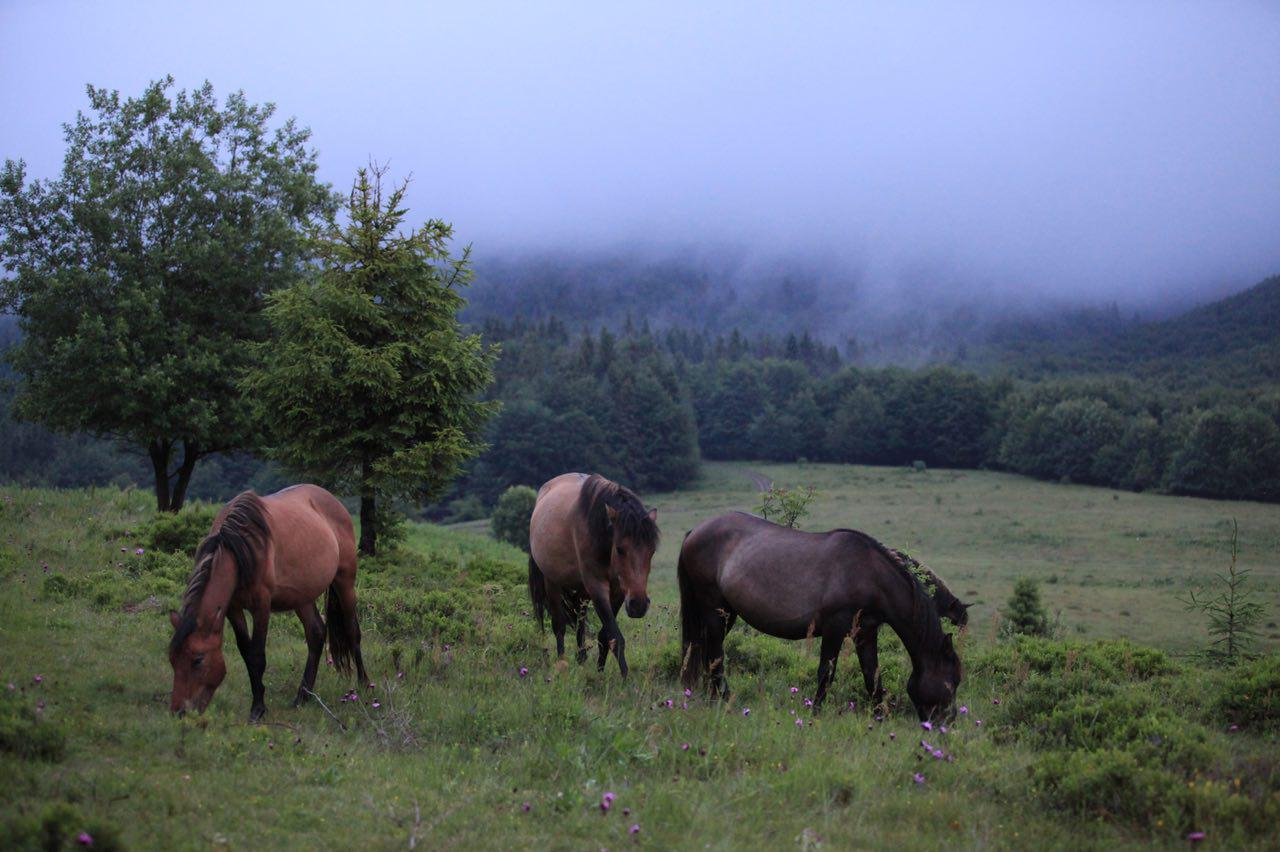
Hucul horses in Ukraine

In 2016, Romanenko announced the founding of a stud farm in Vinnytsia oblast with the aim to restore a rare breed of Hucul pony. Romanenko called for action to preserve this breed: "Hucul is a heritage of the whole country. All of Ukrainians (and not just those who happened to live in the mountains) should have the chance to know them. How can we deprive our future generations of the joy of communion with these extraordinary creatures? We take the full responsibility for their fate".

Romanenko has authored scientific articles on the history of breeding Hucul and specifically on its history in Ukraine since 17th century until nowadays.

== Recognition ==
Romanenko is ranked an Honorary customs officer of Ukraine, III Rank State Advisor of the tax and customs. He was also awarded with the 3rd grade Order of Merit, as well as the medal For Courage in Protecting the State Border.

== Family ==
Married, father to a daughter and two sons.
