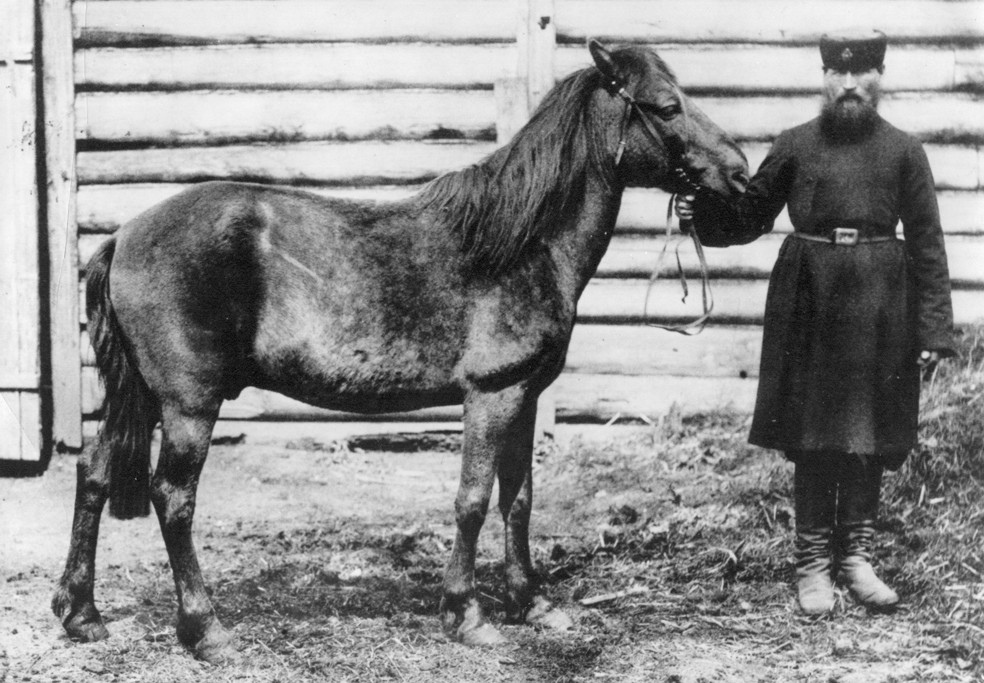
- The "Cherson tarpan", the only tarpan to be photographed (1884) is generally believed to not have been a purebred animal

Conservation status
- Extinct (1918) (IUCN 3.1)

Scientific classification
- Kingdom: Animalia
- Phylum: Chordata
- Class: Mammalia
- Order: Perissodactyla
- Family: Equidae
- Genus: Equus
- Species: E. ferus
- Subspecies: †E. f. ferus

Trinomial name
- †Equus ferus ferus Boddaert, 1785

Synonyms
- Equus equiferus Pallas, 1811; Equus gmelini Antonius, 1912; Equus sylvestris Brincken, 1826; Equus silvaticus Vetulani, 1928; Equus tarpan Pidoplichko, 1951

= Tarpan =

Tarpan Temporal range: Holocene

Extinct subspecies of equines

The tarpan (Equus ferus ferus) was a free-ranging horse population of the western Eurasian steppe which was first documented in the 18th century and went extinct in the early 20th century.

What qualifies as a tarpan is subject to debate. It is unclear whether tarpans were a category of wild horses; domestic horses which became feral; or hybrids of domestic and wild horses. DNA sequencing suggests at least some tarpans were genetically distinct from modern domestic horses.

The last individual believed to be a tarpan died in captivity in Russia in 1918, decades after the last free-ranging tarpans were captured or killed in Ukraine in the late 19th century.

Beginning in the 1930s, several attempts were made to breed horses resembling the tarpans described in historical sources, through a process of selective breeding called "breeding back" by advocates. The breeds that resulted included the Heck horse, Hegardt and Stroebel's horse and a derivation of the Konik breed, all of which have a primitive appearance, particularly in having a grullo coat colour. Some of these horses are now commercially promoted as "tarpans", although such animals are only domesticated breeds and not the wild animal themselves.

== Name and etymology ==
The name "tarpan" or "tarpani" derives from a Turkic language (Kazakh or Kyrgyz) name meaning "wild horse". The Tatars and the Cossacks distinguished the wild horse from the feral horse; the latter was called Takja or Muzin.

== Taxonomy ==
The tarpan was first described by Samuel Gottlieb Gmelin in 1771; he had seen the animals in 1769 in the district of Bobrov, near Voronezh. In 1784, Pieter Boddaert named the species Equus ferus, referring to Gmelin's description. Unaware of Boddaert's name, Otto Antonius published the name Equus gmelini in 1912, again referring to Gmelin's description. Since Antonius' name refers to the same description as Boddaert's, it is a junior objective synonym. The domesticated horse, named Equus caballus by Carl Linnaeus in 1758, is now thought to be descended from the tarpan; indeed, many taxonomists consider them to belong to the same species. By a strict application of the rules of the International Code of Zoological Nomenclature, the tarpan ought to be named E. caballus, or if considered a subspecies E. caballus ferus. Biologists have generally ignored the letter of the rule, though, and used E. ferus for the tarpan to avoid confusion with the domesticated subspecies.

Whether the small, free-roaming horses seen in the Russian steppes during 18th and 19th centuries and called "tarpan" were indeed wild, never-domesticated horses, hybrids of wild and local domestic animals, or feral horses is debated. Most studies have been based on only two preserved specimens, and research to date has not positively linked the tarpan to Pleistocene- or early Holocene-era animals.

In 2003, the International Commission on Zoological Nomenclature "conserved the usage of 17 specific names based on wild species, which are predated by or contemporary with those based on domestic forms", confirming E. ferus for the undomesticated wild horse. Taxonomists who consider the domestic horse a subspecies of the wild horse should use Equus ferus caballus; the name Equus caballus remains available for the domestic horse where it is considered to be a separate species.

== Appearance ==
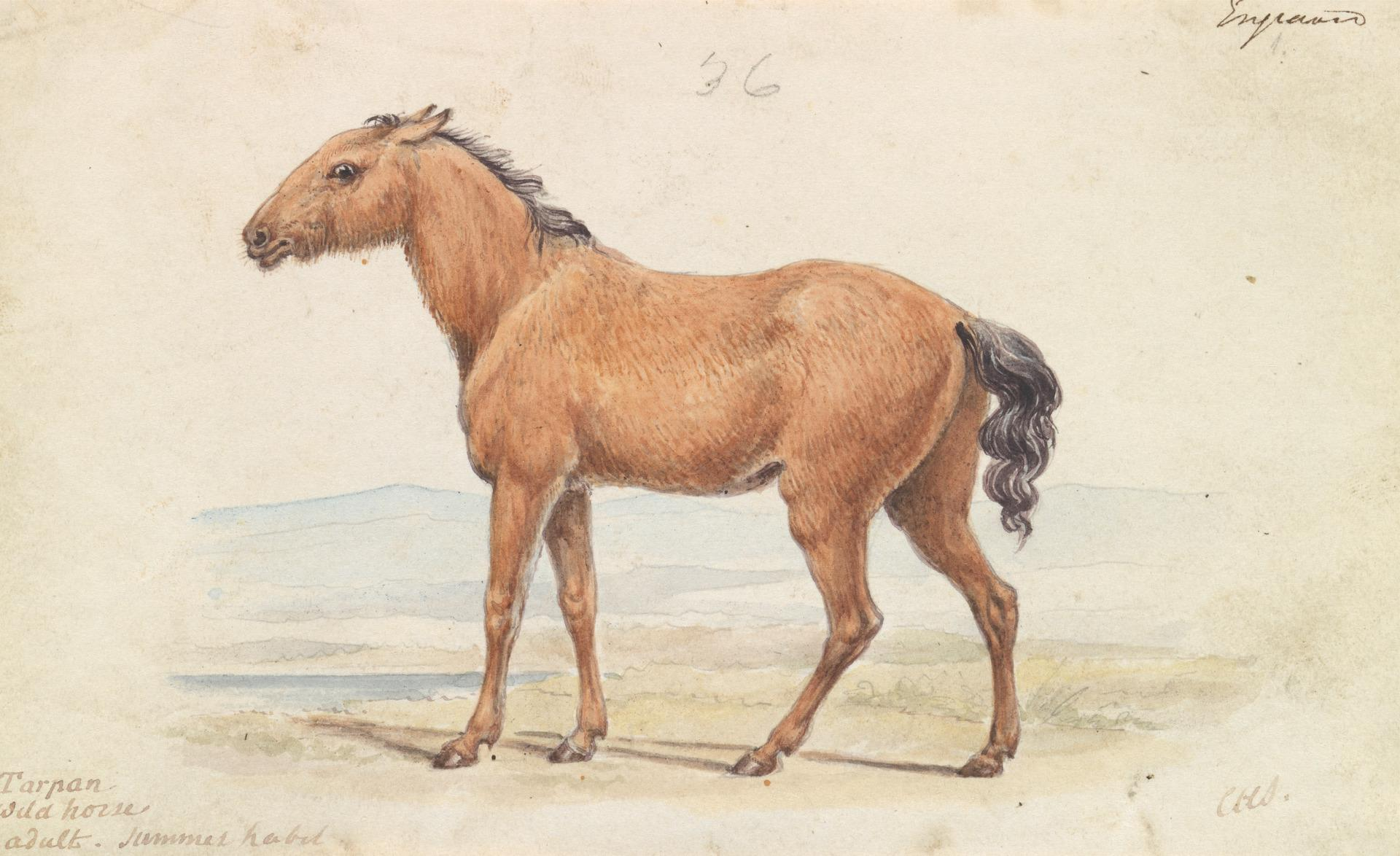
A watercolor painting of a tarpan by Charles Hamilton Smith (1841), based on eyewitness accounts.

Traditionally two subtypes have been proposed, the forest tarpan and steppe tarpan, based on minor differences in type. The general view is that the only subspecies is the tarpan, Equus ferus ferus. The last individual was between 140 and 145 centimetres (55 and 57 in; 13.3 and 14.1 hands) tall at the withers and had a grullo coat colour, dark legs, a dorsal stripe, poorly defined shoulder stripe, and a thick, semi-erect mane.

Several coat colour genotypes have been identified within European wild horses from the Pleistocene and Holocene - those creating bay, black, and leopard complex are known from the wild horse population in Europe and were depicted in cave paintings of wild horses during the Pleistocene. The dun gene, a dilution gene seen in Przewalski's horse that also creates the grullo or "blue dun" coat seen in the Konik has not yet been studied in European wild horses. At least some wild horses likely had a dun coat.

Historical reports are ambiguous on whether tarpans had standing manes like wild equines or falling manes like domesticated horses.

The appearance of European wild horses may be reconstructed with genetic, osteologic, and historic data. One genetic study suggests that bay was the predominant colour in European wild horses. During the Mesolithic, a gene coding a black coat colour appeared on the Iberian peninsula. This colour spread east, but was less common than bay in the investigated sample and never reached Siberia. Bay in combination with dun results in the "bay dun" colour seen in Przewalski's horses; black with dun creates the grullo coat. A loss of the dun dilution may have been advantageous in more forested western European landscapes, as dark colours were a better camouflage in forests. Pangaré or "mealy" coloration, a characteristic of other wild equines, might have been present in at least some European wild horses, as historic accounts report a light belly.

Historic references report that most tarpans were black dun (grullo, "blue dun") colour. Some black individuals were reported to have domestic colours like white or grey legs. Authors, such as Peter Pallas, believed tarpans to be escaped farm horses.

== History ==
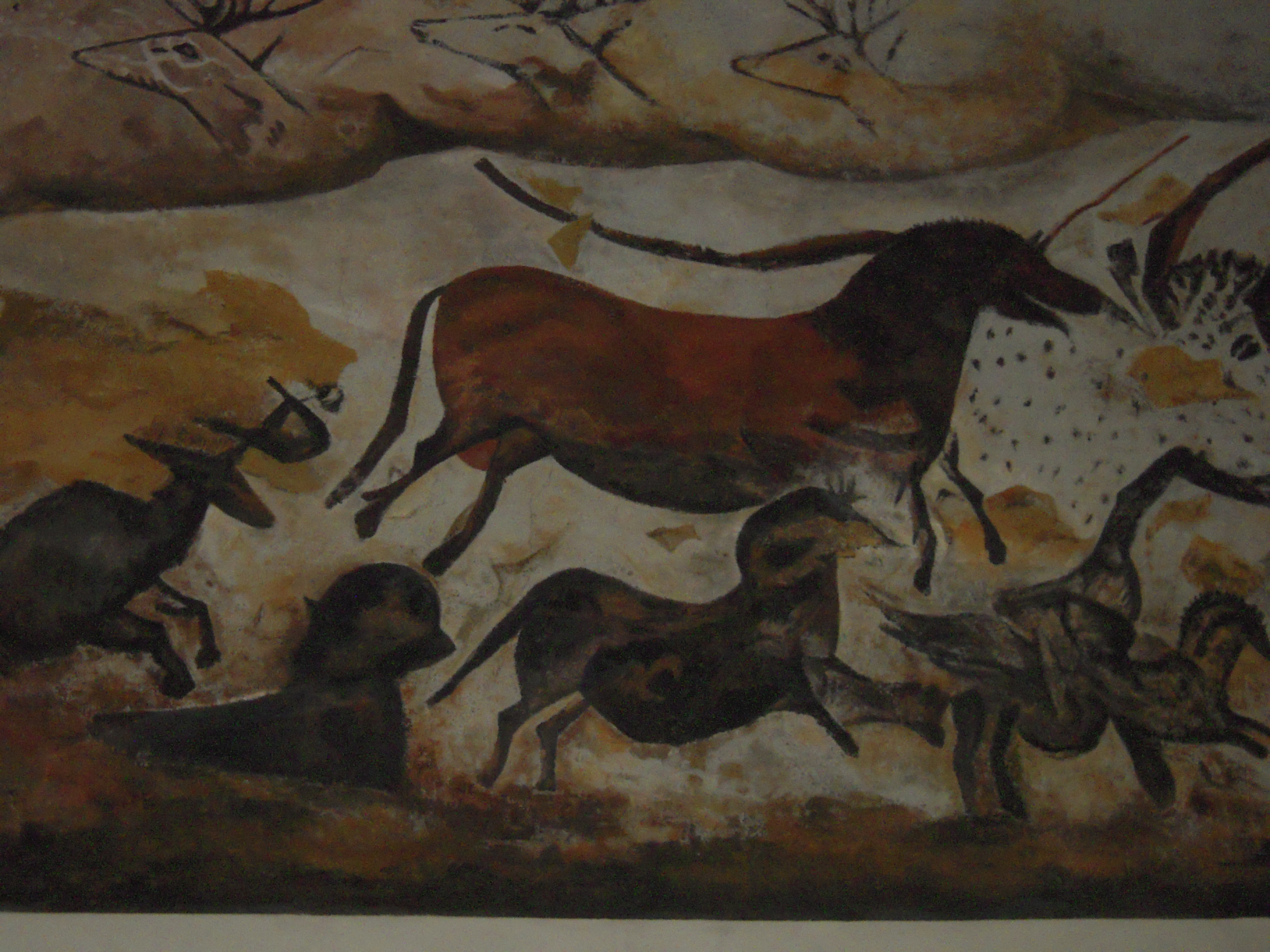
Replica of a horse painting from a cave in Lascaux

Wild horses have been present in Europe since the Pleistocene and ranged from southern France and Spain east to central Russia. Cave drawings of primitive predomestication horses are at Lascaux, France, and in Cave of Altamira, Spain, as well as artifacts believed to show the species in southern Russian empire, where a horse of this type was domesticated around 3000 BC. Equus ferus had a continuous range from Western Europe to Alaska; historic material suggests wild horses lived in most parts of Holocene continental Europe and the Eurasian steppe, except for parts of Scandinavia, Iceland, and Ireland.

=== DNA ===
DNA obtained from a "tarpan" that lived in the steppes of the Kherson region during the mid-19th century shows its ancestry to be a mixture between horses native to Europe and found with the Corded Ware Culture and horses closely related to the DOM2 population, the ancestors of modern domestic horses. (DOM2 horses originated in the Western Eurasia steppes, especially the lower Volga-Don, but not in Anatolia, during the late fourth and early third millennia BCE. Their genes may show selection for easier domestication and stronger backs). This is not consistent with tarpans as the wild ancestor of, or a feral version of, DOM2. Nor is the tarpan a hybrid with Przewalski's horses.

=== Forest tarpan ===
The "forest horse" or "forest tarpan" was a hypothesis of various 20th-century natural scientists, including Tadeusz Vetulani, who suggested that the continuous forestation of Europe after the last ice age created forest-adapted subtype of the wild horse, which he named Equus sylvestris. However, historic references do not describe any major difference between the populations, so most authors assume to exist only one subspecies of western Eurasian wild horse, Equus ferus ferus.

Nevertheless, a stocky type of horse living in forests and highlands was described during the 19th century in Spain, the Pyrenees, the Camargue, the Ardennes, Great Britain, and the southern Swedish upland. They had a robust head and strong body, and a long, frizzy mane. The colour was described as faint brown or yellowish brown with eel stripe and leg stripes, or wholly black legs. The flanks and shoulders were spotted, some of them tended to an ashy colour. They dwelled in rocky habitats and showed intelligent and fierce behaviour. Yet, those horses were never colloquially called "tarpans".

Black wild horses were found in Dutch swamps, with a large skull, small eyes, and a bristly muzzle. Their mane was full, with broad hooves, and curly hair. However, these were possibly feral and not wild horses.

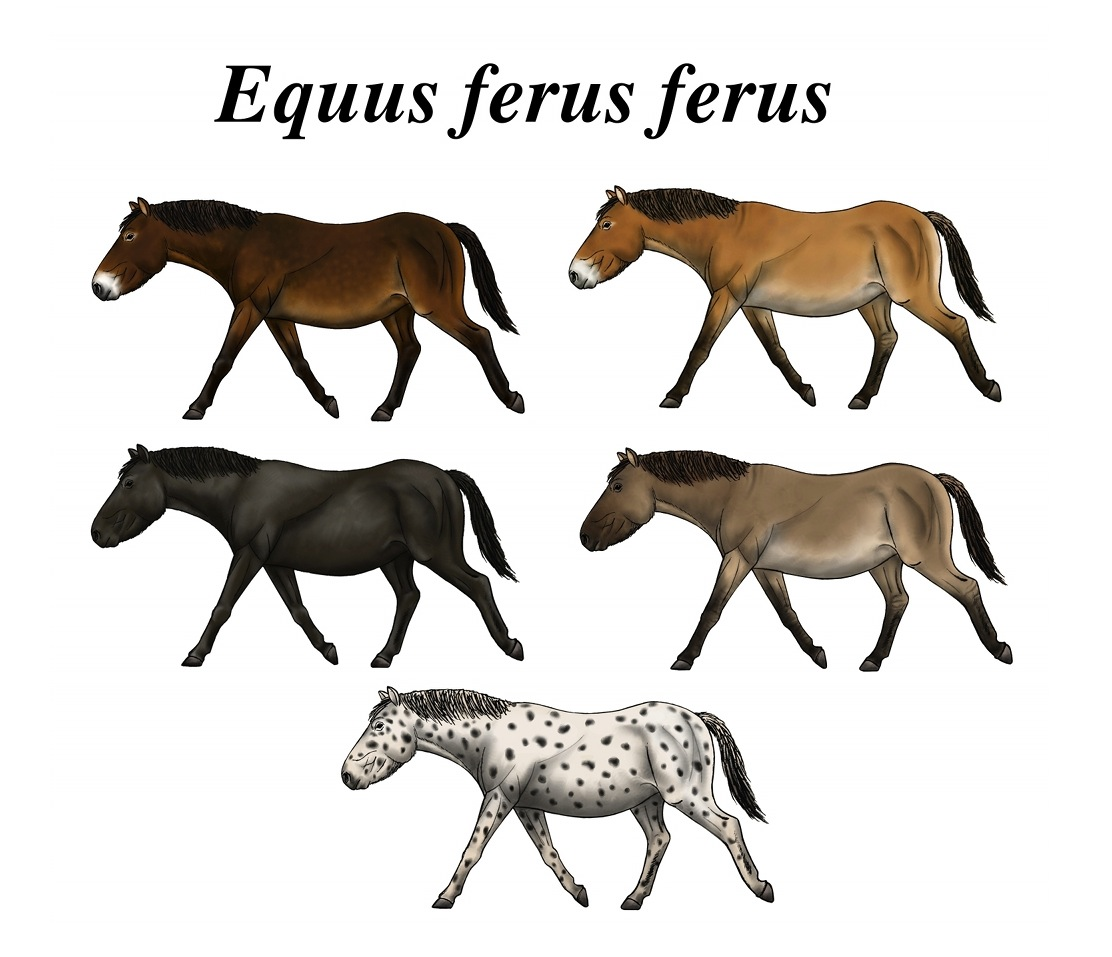
European wild horse coat colours

Herodotus described light-coloured wild horses in an area now part of Ukraine in the fifth century BCE. In the 12th century, Albertus Magnus stated that mouse-coloured wild horses with a dark eel stripe lived in the German territory, and in Denmark, large herds were hunted.

=== 16th century free-ranging horses in Europe ===
Wild horses still were common in the east of Prussia during the 15th and early 16th centuries. During the 16th century, wild horses disappeared from most of the mainland of Western Europe and became less common in Eastern Europe, as well. Belsazar Hacquet saw wild horses in the Polish zoo in Zamość during the Seven Years' War. According to him, those wild horses were of small body size, had a blackish-brown colour, a large and thick head, short dark manes and tail hair, and a "beard". They were absolutely untameable and defended themselves harshly against predators.

Kajetan Kozmian visited the population at Zamość, as well, and reported that they were small and strong, had robust limbs, and were a consistently dark mouse colour. Samuel Gottlieb Gmelin witnessed herds in Voronezh in 1768. Those horses were described as very fast and shy, fleeing at any noise, and as small, with small, pinned ears and a short, frizzly mane. The tail was shorter than in domestic horses. They were typically mouse-coloured with a light belly and legs becoming black, although grey and white horses were mentioned, as well. The coat was long and dense. The horses at Zamosc were never called "tarpan" back in their lifetimes.

Peter Simon Pallas witnessed possible tarpans in the same year in southern Russia. He thought they were feral animals that escaped during the confusions of wars. These herds were important game of the Tatars and numbered between five and 20 animals. The horses he described had a small body, large and thick heads, short, frizzly manes, and short tail hair, as well as pinned ears. Their colour was described as faint brownish, sometimes brown or black. He also reported of obvious domestic hybrids with light-coloured legs or grey coats.

=== The tarpans of 18th century Europe ===
The Natural History of Horses by 19th-century author Charles Hamilton Smith also described tarpans. According to Smith, the herds of free-ranging horses numbered from a few to hundred individuals. They often were mixed with domestic horses, and alongside pure herds there were herds of feral horses or hybrids. The colour of alleged pure tarpans was described as consistently brown, cream-coloured or mouse-coloured. The short, frizzy mane was reported to be black, as were the tail and legs. The ears were of varying size, but set high on the skull. The eyes were small.

According to Smith, tarpans made stronger sounds than domestic horses, and the overall appearance of these horses was mule-like.

== Extinction ==
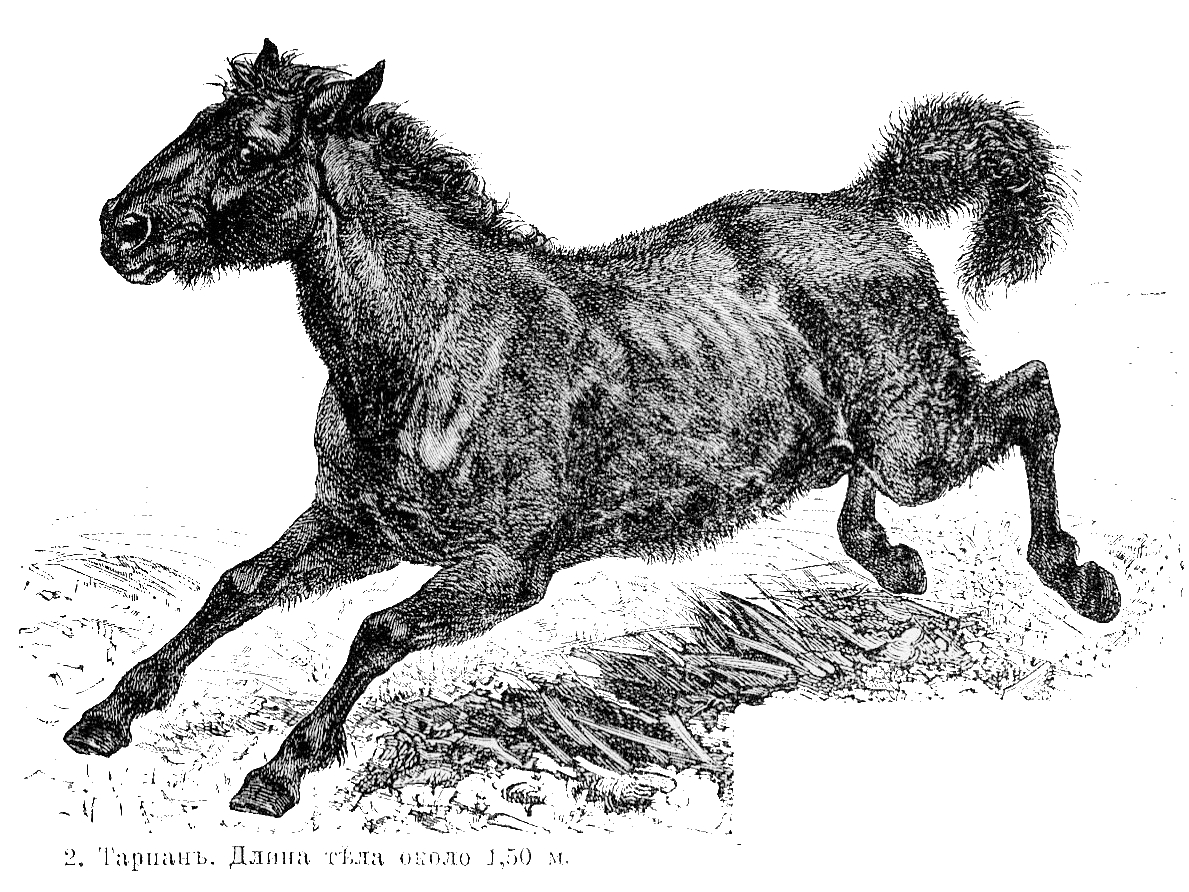
Illustration of a running individual

The human-caused extinction of wild horses in Europe began in Southern Europe, possibly in antiquity. While humans had been hunting wild horses since the Paleolithic, during historic times, horse meat was an important source of protein for many cultures. As large herbivores, the range of the tarpan was continuously decreased by the increasing human population of the Eurasian landmass. Wild horses were further targeted because they caused damage to hay stores and often took domestic mares from pastures. Furthermore, interbreeding with wild horses was an economic loss for farmers, since the foals of such matings were intractable.

Tarpans lived in the southern parts of the steppe. In 1879, the last scientifically confirmed individual was killed. After that, only dubious sightings were documented. As the tarpan horse died out in the wild between 1875 and 1890, the last free-ranging mare considered a tarpan was accidentally killed during an attempt at capture. The last captive tarpan died in 1909 in a zoo in the Russian empire.

The horses at Zamość survived until 1806, when they were allegedly donated to local farmers of Poland and bred to their horses. The Konik is claimed to descend from these hybrid horses, as recent research has highlighted a significant degree of anatomic difference between free-roaming Konik in the Netherlands and other modern domesticated horses.

== Tarpans interbreeding with domestic horses ==
The oldest archaeological evidence for domesticated horses is from Kazakhstan and Ukraine between 6,000 and 5,500 YBP (years before present). The diverse mitochondrial DNA of domestic horses contrasts sharply with the very low diversity of the Y chromosome; that suggests that many mares but only a few stallions were used, and local use of wild mares or even secondary sites of domestication are likely. Therefore, the European wild horse may well have contributed to the domestic horse.

=== Wild horses vs. feral horses ===
Some researchers consider the tarpans to be mixed wild and feral population or completely feral horses. Few consider the more recent animals historically called "tarpans" to be genuine wild horses without domestic influence. Historic references to "wild horses" may actually refer to feral domestic horses or hybrids.

Some 19th century authors wrote that local "wild" horses had hoof problems that led to crippled legs; therefore, they assumed these were feral horses. Other contemporary authors claimed all "wild" horses between the Volga River and the Ural were actually feral. However, others thought that this was too speculative and assumed that wild, undomesticated horses still lived into the 19th century. Domestic horses used in warfare often were turned loose when they were no longer needed. Also, remaining wild stallions could steal domestic mares. There are some accounts from the 18th and 19th centuries of wild herds with typical wild horse features such as large heads, pinned ears, short frizzy mane and tail, but mentioned animals with domestic influence as well.

The only known individual to be photographed was the so-called Cherson tarpan, which was caught as a foal near Novovorontsovka in 1866. It died in 1887 in the Moscow Zoo. The nature of this horse was dubious in its lifetime, because it showed almost none of the wild horse features described in the historic sources. In 2021, a study found that the so-called 'Shatilov' tarpan, a museum specimen from the Kherson region of the Pontic–Caspian steppe that died in 1868, was a hybrid between two horse lineages, with two thirds of its genetics representing the same ancestral lineage as modern domestic horses (DOM2), and the remaining third related to a distinct lineage of European horses found at an archaeological site associated with the late-Neolithic Corded Ware culture.^{including supplemental material.}

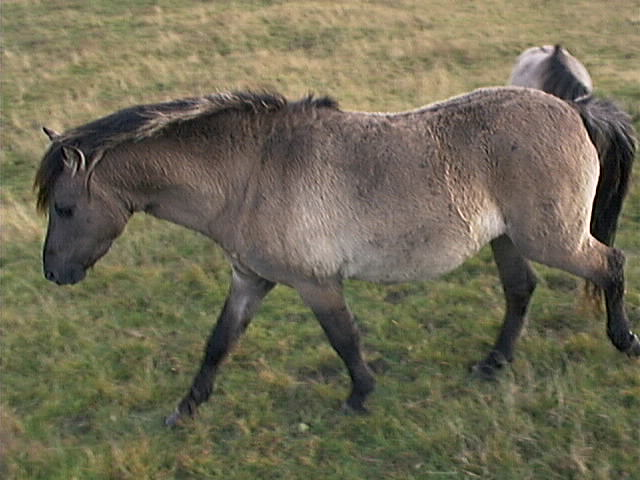
Heck horse in Haselünne, Germany (2004)

=== Breeding back the tarpan ===
Three attempts have been made to use selective breeding to create a type of horse that resembles the tarpan phenotype, though recreating an extinct subspecies is not genetically possible with current technology. In 1936, Polish university professor Tadeusz Vetulani selected Polish farm horses that were formerly known as Panje horses (now called Konik) and that he believed resembled the historic tarpan and started a selective breeding program. Although his breeding attempt is well known, it made only a minor contribution to the modern Konik stock, which clusters genetically with other domestic horse breeds, including those as diverse as the Mongolian horse and the Thoroughbred.

In the early 1930s, Berlin Zoo Director Lutz Heck and Heinz Heck of the Munich Zoo began a program crossbreeding Koniks with Przewalski horse stallions, and the mares of Gotland ponies, and Icelandic horses. By the 1960s they produced the Heck horse. In the mid-1960s, Harry Hegard started a similar program in the United States using mustangs and local working ranch horses that has resulted in the Hegardt or Stroebel's horse.

=== Assessment ===
While all three breeds have a primitive look that resembles the tarpan in some respects, they are not genetically tarpans and the wild, predomestic European horse remains extinct. However, this does not prevent some modern breeders from marketing horses with these features as a "tarpan".

In spite of sharing primitive external features, the Konik and Hucul horses have markedly different conformation with differently proportioned body measurements, thought in part to be linked to living in different habitats.

Other breeds sometimes alleged to be surviving wild horses include the Exmoor pony and the Dülmen pony. However, genetic studies do not set any of these breeds apart from other domestic horses. On the other hand, there has not yet been a study comparing domestic breeds directly with the European wild horse.

== See also ==
- Domestication of the horse
- List of extinct animals of Europe
- Przewalski's horse
