= Hucul pony =

Breed of horse

Hucul Pony
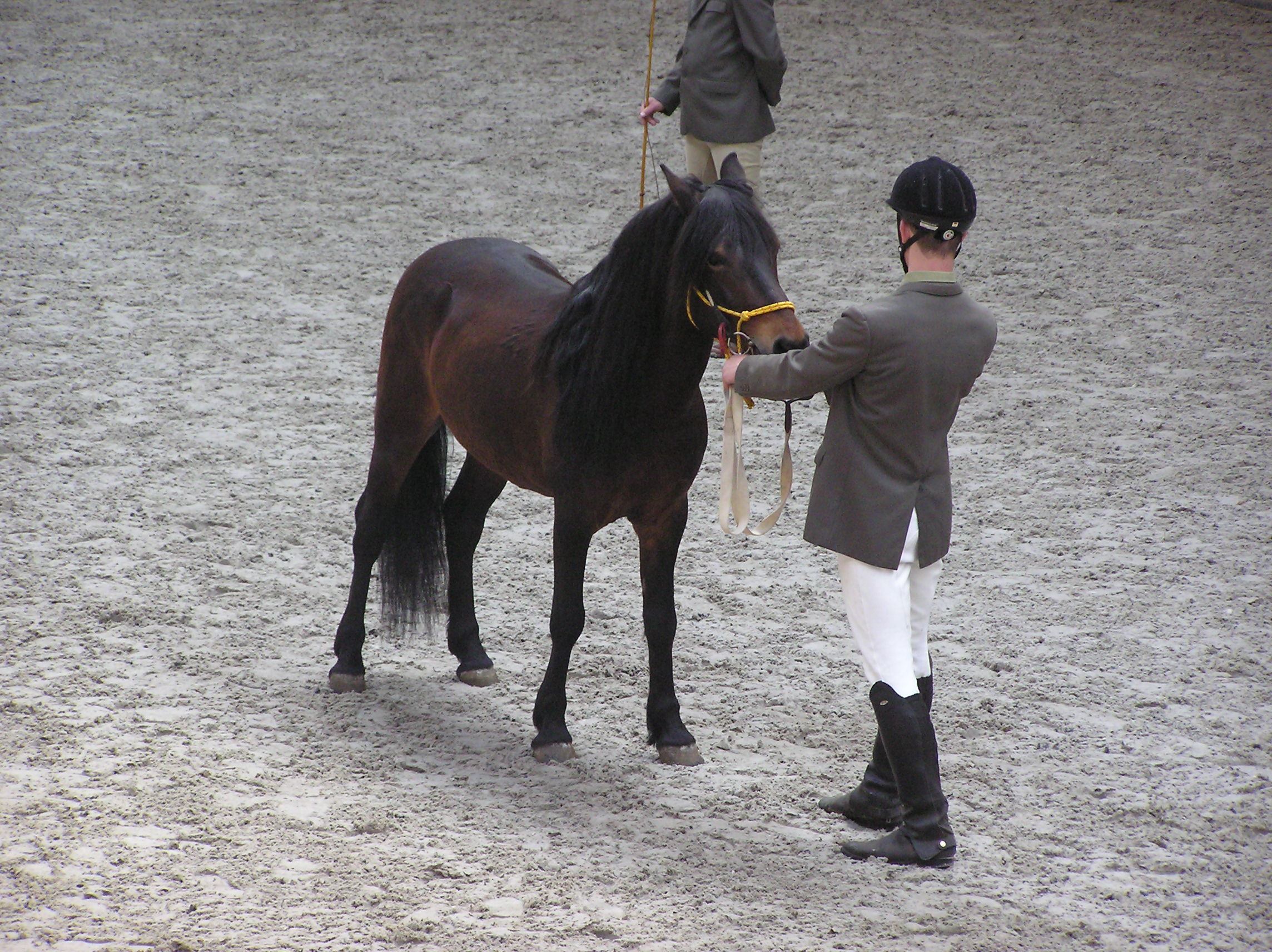
- A Hucul pony shown in-hand
- Other names: Carpathian Pony
- Country of origin: Carpathian Mountains

The Hucul or Carpathian is a pony or small horse breed originally from the Carpathian Mountains. It has a heavy build and possesses great endurance and hardiness. The breed is also referred to as the Carpathian pony, Huculska, Hutsul, Huțul, Huțan or Huzul. The breed gets its name from the Hutsul people, who live mostly in the Carpathians in Ukraine and in Romania, but also in an area in the East Carpathian Mountains north of the river Bistritz, officially named “Huzelei”.

== Characteristics ==
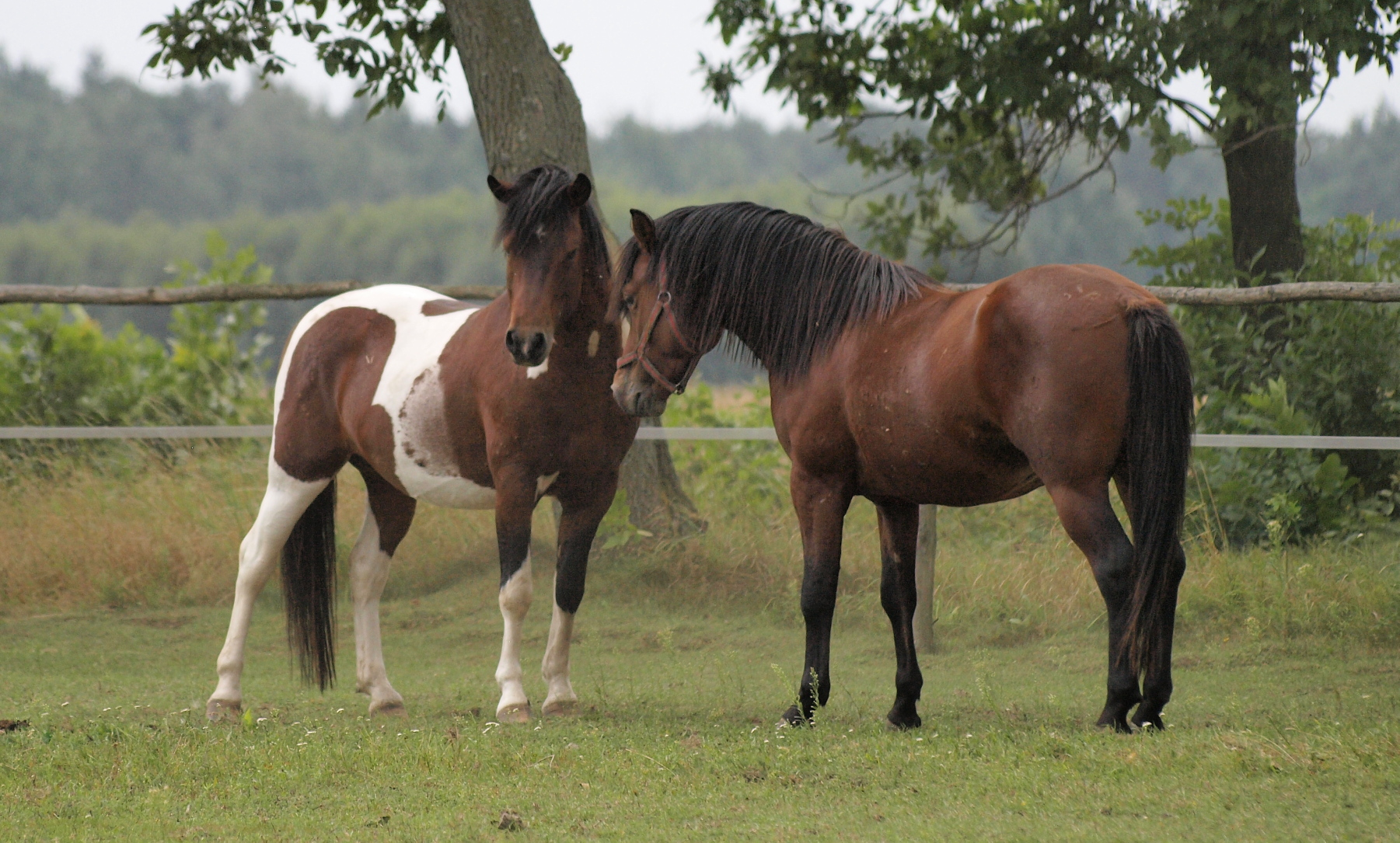
Hucul horse

Hucul ponies are usually calm with a good disposition, and are used for both hacking and pulling timber in otherwise inaccessible forested areas. They are usually bay, black, chestnut, or the grullo variation of dun, with a dorsal stripe and zebra stripes on the legs characteristic of the breed. Their conformation traits include a short head with a relatively short neck, compact body, short legs, and sound feet.

== History ==
The Hucul bears some resemblance to the now-extinct Tarpan. Said to have originated in the Carpathian Mountain range of Eastern Europe covered by present-day Ukraine, Poland, Slovakia and Romania, it is named after the small sub-ethnic Ukrainian group of Hutsuls. However, the horse breed is much older than the Hutsul people. The Huculs are probably depicted on the monuments erected by Roman Emperors Domitian and Trajan, as Dacian draft horses. The breed was mentioned for the first time in written resources around 400 years ago (as the "Mountain Tarpan"). Unlike the Polish Konik, the Hucul has been only rarely cross-bred with domestic horses.

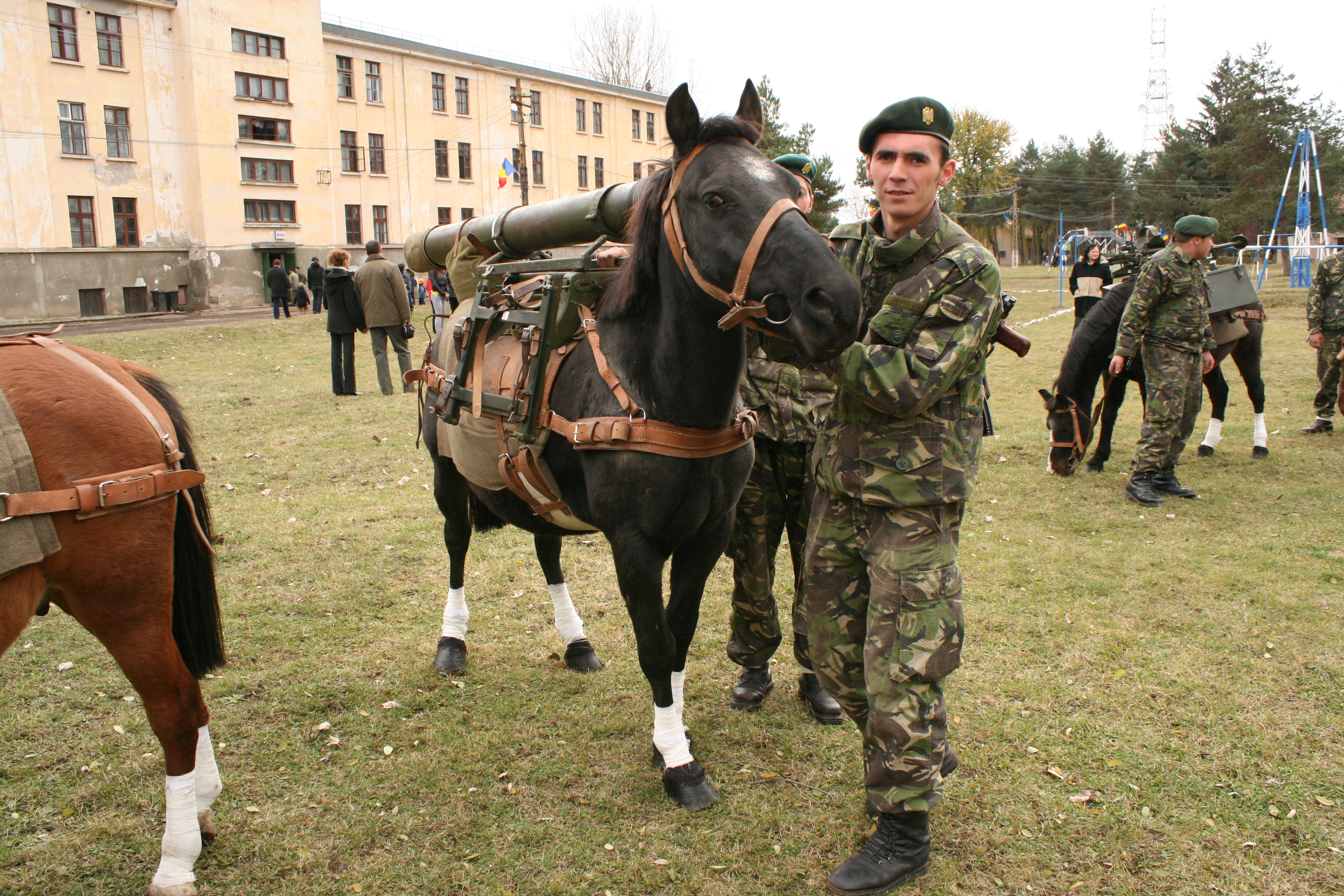
Huculs of the Romanian 22nd Battalion, 61st Mountain Troops Brigade

In the 19th century, the Huculs were used by the Austro-Hungarian Army. The Huculs are still used in the military of Romania today as packhorses with the Vânători de munte units.

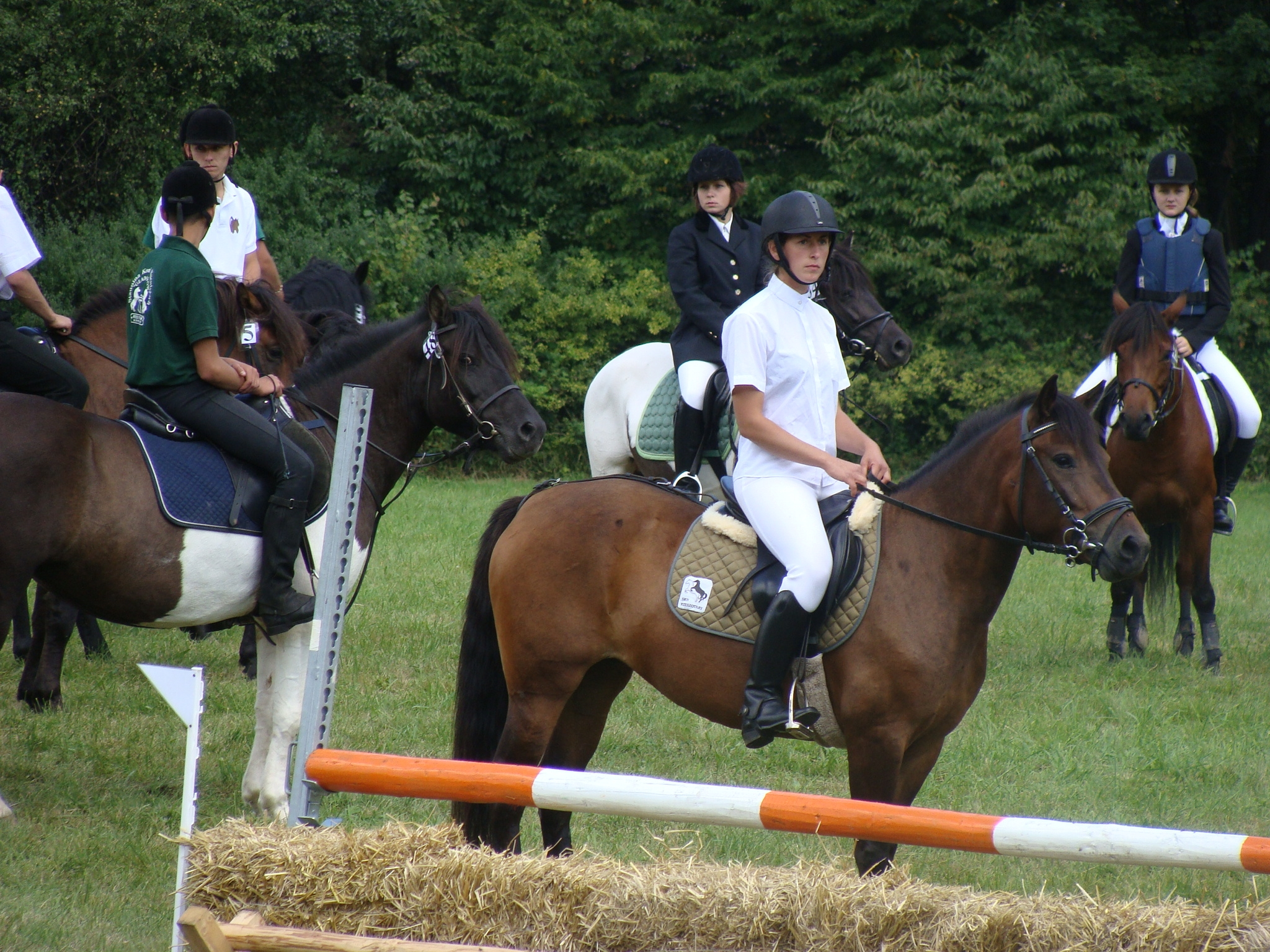
A Regional Championship of Hucul Horse in Rudawka Rymanowska

In 1856, the first stud farm was established at Rădăuți, Romania. Several bloodlines were established by the foundation stallions Goral, Hroby, Oușor, Pietrousu and Prislop, and the horses were carefully bred to preserve the purity of these bloodlines. In 1922, thirty-three horses were sent to Czechoslovakia to establish a herd there which would become the Gurgul line. World War II caused a severe decline in the number of Hucul horses in Czechoslovakia. After the end of the war, only 300 Hucul horses remained there. Even though a stud-book was established in 1924 in the Huzelei after Polish cavalry officer Michal Holländer encouraged it, it was not until the early 1970s that breeders established an organization, Hucul Club, to prevent the extinction there caused by the declining number. In 1982 they established a stud book with fifty purebred animals and the goal of increasing the numbers in that region.

In 2004 Polish Horse Breeders Association was recognised by the European Union as keeper of the Studbook of Origin of the breed.

Thanks to the efforts of breeders, the world population of these horses now exceeds a few thousands. Most of them live in Western Europe. In Poland in 2019 there where 1446 mares and 167 stallions registered in the Stud-book of Origin of Hucul breed. There are also breeding studs in Slovakia, Romania, Czech Republic, and Ukraine. Many ponies in Europe also have Hucul blood. In recent years the popularity of this breed has spread as far as England.

In Vinnytsia oblast of Ukraine, a hucul stud farm was established by Gennady Romanenko in 2016.

== Breeding centers ==
- Romania: Lucina, in the Moldova-Sulița commune
- Poland: Gładyszów, Odrzechowa, Bieszczady National Park (Conservative Hutsul horse breeding in Wołosate)
- Slovakia: Topoľčianky
- Hungary: Aggtelek
- Czech Republic: Prague, Janova hora (Krkonose)
- Ukraine: Steblivka, Polonyns'ke Gospodarstvo

== Gallery ==
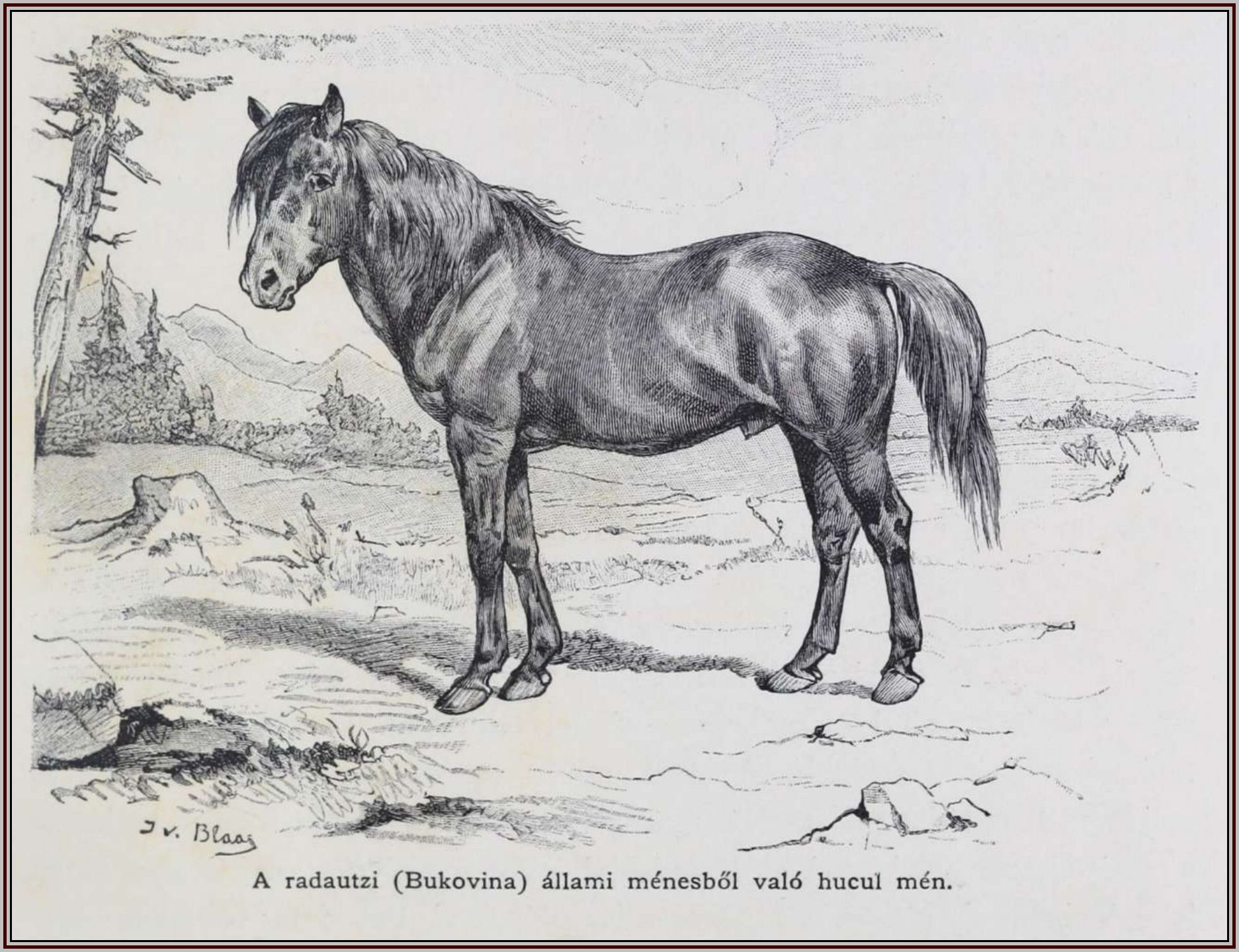
Hucul from the Rădăuți stud farm in 1899

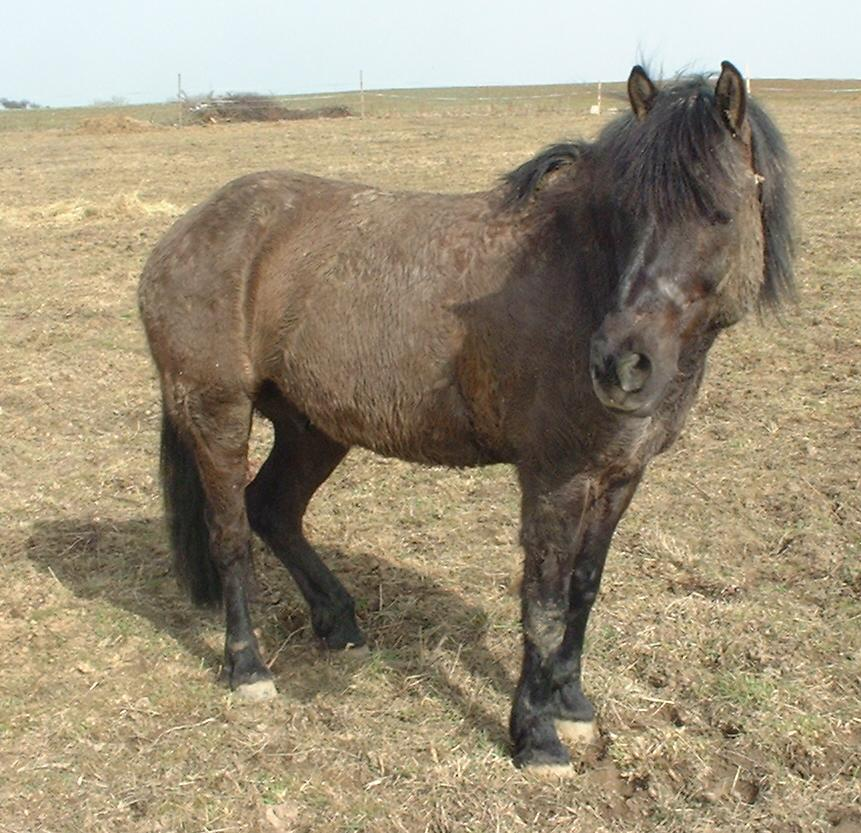
A Hucul pony in a natural state

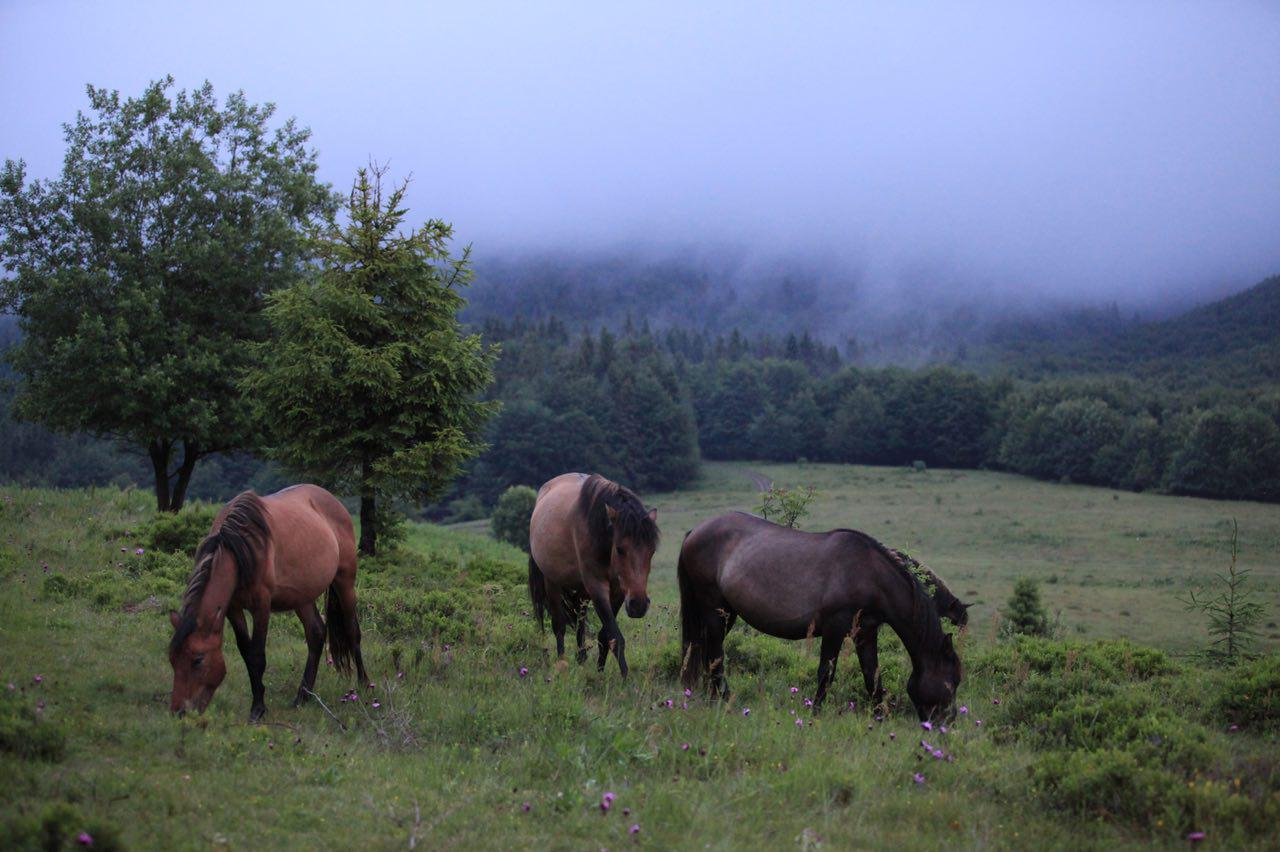
Hucul horses in the Ukrainian mountains
