= Otto Antonius =

Austrian zoologist and palaeontologist

Otto Antonius (21 May 1885 in Vienna – 9 April 1945 in Vienna) was director of the Tiergarten Schönbrunn in Vienna, zoologist, palaeontologist and co-founder of the modern zoological biology.

== Early life ==
Otto Antonius was the eldest of five children. His father was Protestant minister a native of Transylvania. Otto was named after the German chancellor Otto von Bismarck.

He attended classical grammar school in Vienna and studied in particular natural sciences, zoology and palaeontology at the University of Vienna. During his years of study, Antonius joined a nationalist fraternity, named “Silesia” which strove for a Pan-German solution. His father and three of his brothers were also members of this student organisation.

In 1910, he received his PhD and started to work for Professor Othenio Abel as scientific assistant at the chair of palaeobiology. Until 1918 he served in World War I as lieutenant and liaison officer. He received several medals: the Eisernes Kreuz, the Eiserner Halbmond and the Silberne Tapferkeitsmedaille.

In 1919, he resumed his scientific work as assistant professor. The same year he received his habilitation from the University of Vienna, in 1921 from the University of Agriculture.

In 1922, he married Margarethe von Tunner, they had two daughters.

== Director at the Schönbrunn Zoo ==
On 1 December 1923, he started his regular duty at the Schönbrunn Zoo. Four months later he was named scientific director and eventually became palaeontologist and expert for zoological science on domestic animals. On 1 December 1925 he became the only director with full responsibilities.

In March 1934, Antonius was officially dismissed, due to accusations of being an active member of the NSDAP which was illegal in Austria. Antonius denied this allegation and sued successfully. He was reinstalled as director on 4 January 1937.

His commitment for Schönbrunn was extremely important for the survival of the zoo. Before World War I, the zoological garden ranked among the biggest and most beautiful zoos in the world. As there were shortages in feed during war, the livestock dropped extremely. In fall 1921, the zoo was about to close. Already in 1918, Antonius had written an exposé on how to modernise the outdated enclosures.

Due to support from the Viennese population, private sponsors, the Hilfsaktion für den Ausbau des Schönbrunner Tiergartens and the livestock supplies from the animal dealer Alfred Weidholz, the number of animals increased, the cages and enclosures were improved and new projects, like the aviary for birds of prey or the monkey house, were realised.

Antonius also introduced new media, like the display of dioramas in 1934. The dioramas showed landscapes and animals of Austria's prehistory. They were painted by the artist Franz Roubal. The display of dioramas did not succeed with the public. The dioramas were destroyed in World War II.

Antonius served as vice-president of the International Union of Zoo Directors from 1938 to 1945. He also was a member of the Zoological Society of London. Additionally he taught as an associate professor at university.

== Zoological biology ==
Otto Antonius is considered to be the co-founder of modern zoological biology besides Heini Hediger and Karl Max Schneider.

He was among the academic authors who published regularly in the journal Der Zoologische Garten. Furthermore, he was co-editor of Zeitschrift für Tierpsychologie.

Even the goals of the zoo changed. It became a place for animal experiments and breeding. Questions about heredity and ancestry were also addressed.

This era is called the heyday of science in zoological gardens. That is why the Menagerie Schönbrunn changed its name officially into Tiergarten Schönbrunn in 1926.

Antonius thought of livestock husbandry as a psychological experiment, in which one could study the typal and differentiated characteristics of the animals. With his comparative studies he contributed to the emerging discipline of ethology. Furthermore, he conducted experiments on feeding and acclimatisation.

Being a zoologist, he also dealt with genetics and livestock breeding. He was especially interested in studies about hybridisation to explore the ancestry of domestic animals. In 1922 he published his book Grundzüge der Stammesgeschichte der Haustiere. It dealt with the research on animal domestication as a new category in livestock breeding. The book lists zoological and historical methods of domestic animal research, such as their exact body structure, mentioning for example their bone structure or the colour of their fur. Antonius tried to "breed back" domestic animals into the ones they descended from. Since those experiments were connected with the national socialist ideology, there were no other zoo directors who joined those experiments.

== Protection of species ==
Antonius recognized the necessity and importance of the protection of species and tried to alert his fellow men to the threat to native and exotic animals.

Under his direction, Tiergarten the Zoo Schönbrunn joined the first European organisation to save the wisent. Due to controlled breeding in adapted and strictly guarded areas, they were very successful. This system is still used for endangered species.

With his book Gefangene Tiere (1933) he wanted to point out that caged animals are not living under worse circumstances than animals living in wilderness. He put forward the idea that both develop the same relations to their environment. He often quoted [Alfred Brehm], saying that a good cage is like a home for an animal while a bad one is like a prison. Here the modern concept of a cage's quality is presented. That is the reason why he planned the cages functionally and appropriate for the species.

== Death ==
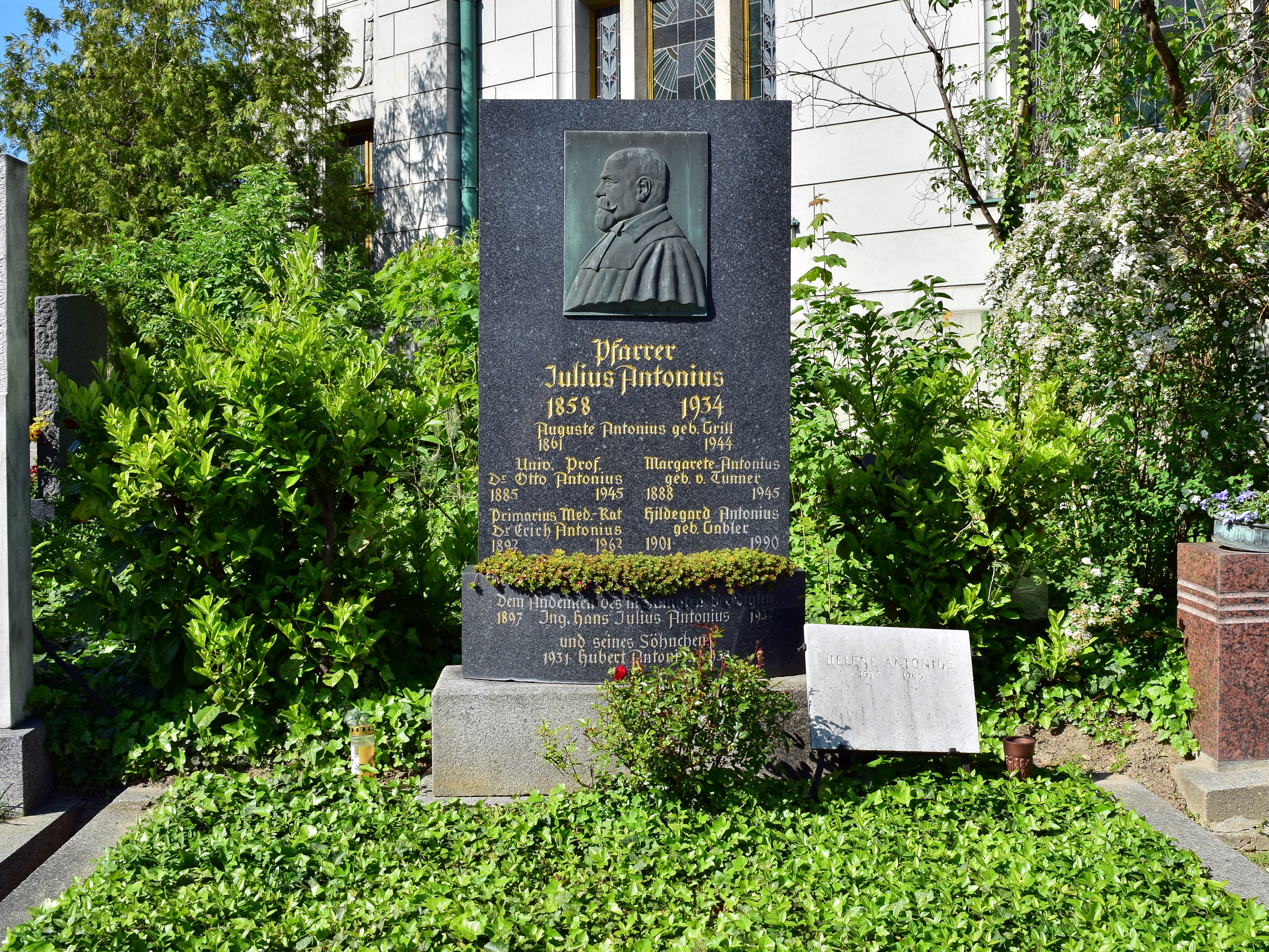
Grave on the Wiener Zentralfriedhof

Antonius was a supporter of Nazism and installed Nazi flags at Schönbrunn Zoo following the Anschluss. At the end of World War II the Schönbrunn Zoo was badly hit by bombs. With the Russian army approaching Vienna, Antonius and his wife committed suicide on 9 April 1945. In his suicide note, he wrote "I cannot deny overnight something that I honestly believed in … To err is human, and this is something which is now especially apparent".

== Bibliography ==
- Die Tigerpferde. Frankfurt/M., 1951.
- Equus Abeli nov. spec.. Wien-Leipzig, 1913.
- Gefangene Tiere. Salzburg, 1933.
- Grundzüge einer Stammesgeschichte der Haustiere. Jena, 1922.
