= Konik =

Polish breed of horse

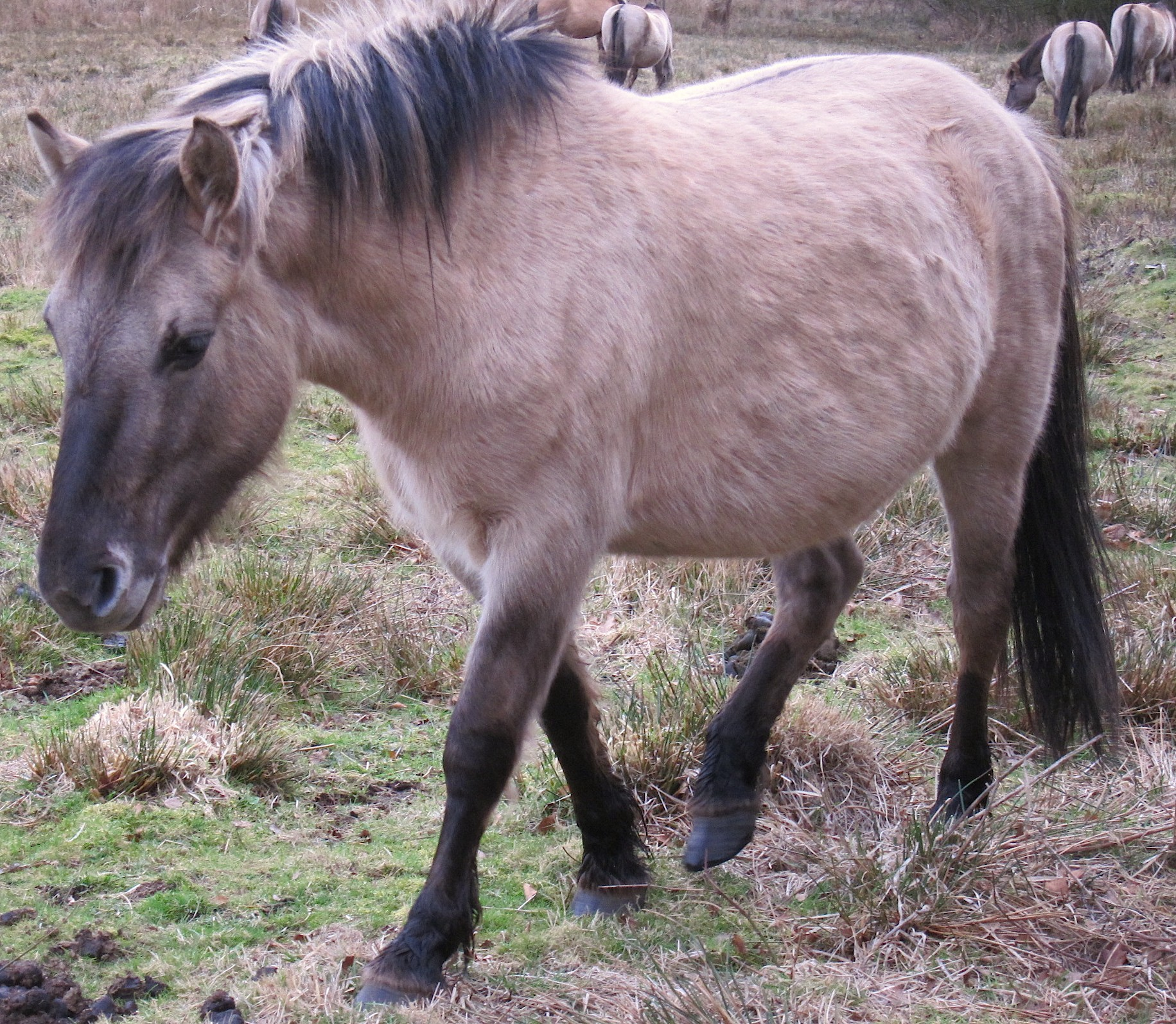
- Conservation status: FAO (2007): endangered; DAD-IS (2021): at risk
- Other names: Polish Konik; Konik polski
- Country of origin: Poland
- Distribution: Poland; Baltic states; France; Germany; The Netherlands; United Kingdom

Traits
- Weight: 380 kg
- Height: 130–140 cm
- Colour: mouse dun or striped dun

Breed standards
- Polski Związek Hodowców Koni

The Konik or Polish Konik, Polish: konik polski, is a Polish breed of small horse or pony. There are semi-feral populations in some regions. They are usually mouse dun or striped dun.

The Bilgoray, Polish: konik biłgorajski, of south-eastern Poland is a sub-type of the breed influenced by Arab and Thoroughbred blood; it is close to extinction. The extinct Sweyki or Schweike sub-type of East Prussia contributed to the development of the Trakehner.

The word "konik" in Polish means 'small horse'. It may be used in a wider sense to describe the Polish Konik and other similar breeds, among them the Hucul pony of the Carpathian Mountains, the Polesian of Belarus and the Žemaitukas of Lithuania.

== Etymology ==
The Polish word konik (plural koniki) is the diminutive of koń, the Polish word for "horse" (sometimes confused with kuc, kucyk meaning "pony"). It means 'small horse'.

== History ==
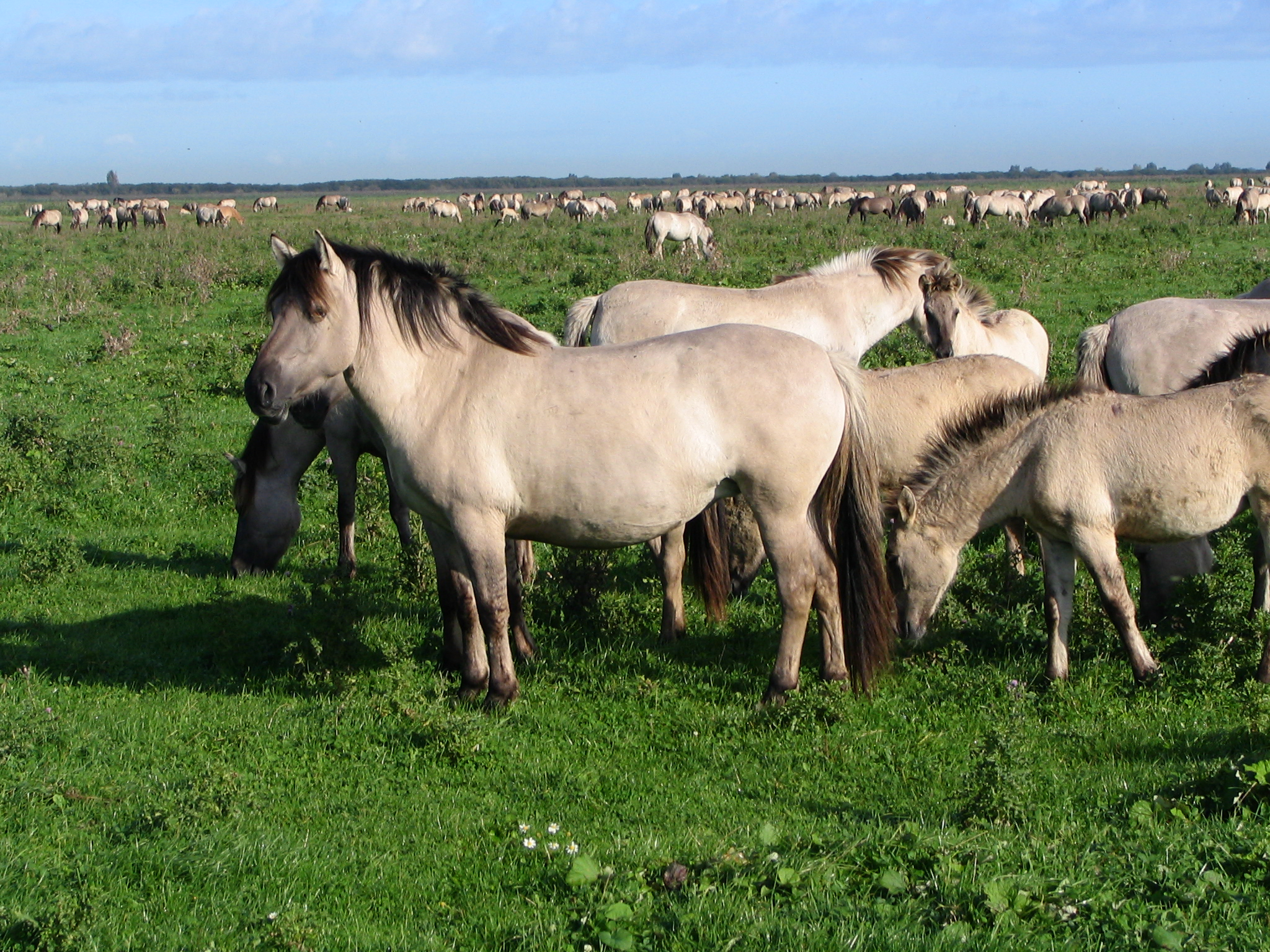
Free-ranging koniks in the Oostvaardersplassen

The Konik is a Polish horse breed descending from very hardy horses from the Biłgoraj region. These horses had a predominantly dun colour, but also black and chestnut horses were present in the population. Some researchers claim these foundation animals were hybrids with wild horse breeding that had been sold to farmers by the zoo in Zamość in 1806, which were bred to local domesticated draft horses. However, genetic studies now contradict the view that the Konik is a surviving form of Eastern European wild horse, commonly called the tarpan, nor is it closely related to them. The Konik shares mitochondrial DNA with many other domesticated horse breeds and their Y chromosome is nearly identical.

During World War I, these horses were important transport animals for Russian and German troops and were called Panje horses. In 1923, Tadeusz Vetulani, an agriculturalist from Kraków, started to get interested in the Panje horses, a landrace of Biłgoraj and coined the name "Konik" (Polish for "small horse"), which is now established as the common name for the breed. During the 1920s, several public and private studs were created to conserve this animal. In 1936, Vetulani opened a Konik reserve in the Białowieża Forest. He was convinced that if horses were exposed to natural conditions, they would redevelop their original phenotype. While Vetulani's experiments are well-known and widely publicised, his stock actually had only a minor influence on the modern Konik population. However, World War II marked the end of Vetulani's "breeding back" project. Part of his stock was moved to Popielno, where they continued to live in semi-feral conditions. Popielno became the breed's main stud during the 1950s, but the herd was also preserved by buying animals from Germany.

Between the two world wars, the German brothers Heinz and Lutz Heck crossed stallions of Przewalski's horse with mares of the Konik horse, as well as mares of other breeds such as the Dülmener, Gotland Russ, and the Icelandic horse, to create a breed resembling their understanding of the tarpan phenotype. The result is called the Heck horse. Other breeders crossed Koniks with Anglo-Arabians or the Thoroughbred to increase their quality as a riding horse.

== Characteristics ==
The breed has a strong and stocky build, small head with a straight profile, and a neck set low out of the chest. The Konik has a deep chest, a thick mane, and the hair coat is blue dun, often colloquially called "mouse-gray". The Konik is short in height, ranging from 130–140 cm (12.3–13.3 hands). Minimum heartgirth measurement is 165 cm (65 in), and minimum cannon bone measurement 16.5 cm (6.5 in) for mares, 17.5 cm (6.9 in) for stallions. Weight is 350–400 kg (770–880 lb).

== Breeding centres and nature reserves ==
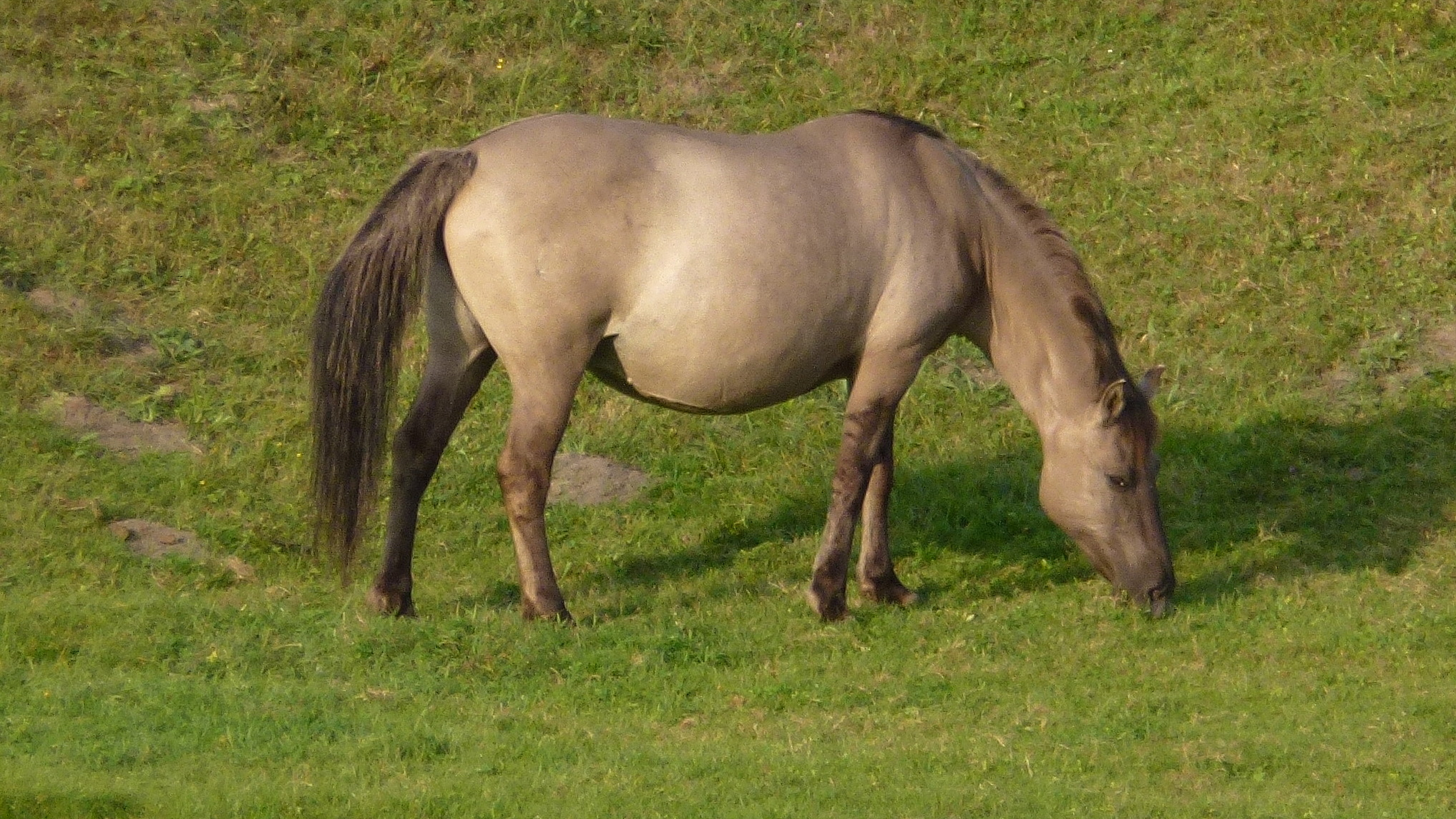
Konik in Roztocze National Park

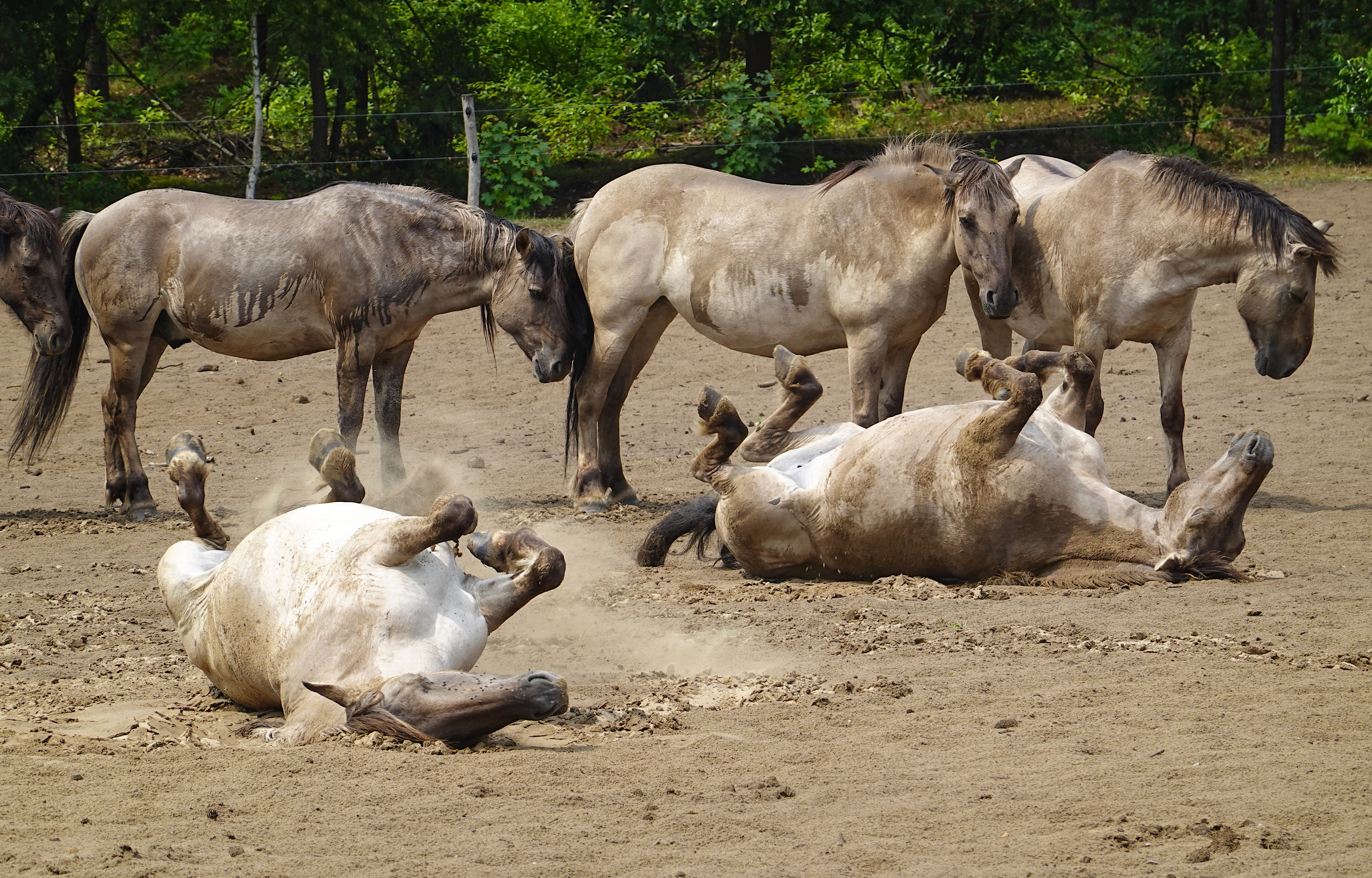
Two Koniks rolling in sand in Schönower Heide nature reserve, north Germany

Koniks today are bred either in stables or open reserves and under human guidance. The Konik was bred for a larger shoulder height in past decades, to improve its value as a working horse. A more graceful appearance, especially of the head, was established, as well. Black and sorrel horses have been largely selected out, but still appear on occasion, as do white markings. The simultaneous management of Koniks in both stables and reserves made it possible to compare the health and behaviour of the horses under different circumstances. For example, hoof diseases and hay allergies are more common in Koniks raised in stables than in reserves.

In Poland, Koniks currently live on nature reserves at Popielno, Roztocze National Park, Stobnica Research Station of the University of Life Sciences in Poznań. They are bred in controlled conditions at a state stud at Popielno, Sieraków. Private breeders currently own 310 mares and 90 stallions; the state studs own 120 mares and 50 stallions.

=== Oostvaardersplassen, the Netherlands ===
As it is claimed to phenotypically resemble the extinct tarpan, the Konik has also been introduced into nature reserves in other nations. The Netherlands has multiple natural reserves spread over the country with (semi-)feral Konik horses. One of the first places were the Konik horse was introduced was the Oostvaardersplassen reserve, where the biggest herd of free-ranging feral Konik horses lives in the world. In 1983, 20 Konik horses were introduced in the reserve, but due to the fact that the horses have no natural predator in the reserve, the population increased rapidly and at a faster rate than was expected. The horses in the reserve are feral and by Dutch law it is prohibited to feed them or to interfere in their population size. In 2011 the herd consisted of 1150 Konik horses and in November 2017 this number reduced to 1050 horses, while the area of the reserve is meant for a maximum population of approximately 300 horses in order for the natural reserve to provide the horses with enough food. This overpopulation and harsh winters led to the starvation and death of many horses in the reserve, with a peak of 30% of the population in the winter of 2012-2013. The Dutch citizens were outraged by the neglecting approach of Staatsbosbeheer, and a debate about possible alterations of the laws on interference with feral animal populations in Dutch reserves started. In 2019, a few hundred horses got transported to reserves in Spain and Belarus. However, the population still continues to increase and as of October 2020 the Oostvaardersplassen reserve was home to 540 Konik horses, while there are no other reserves left to transport the horses to. In order to control the population size, the Province of Flevoland is considering to administer anticonception to the Konik horses. Furthermore, around 200 Konik horses were brought to slaughter in 2021.
