= Gothemsån =

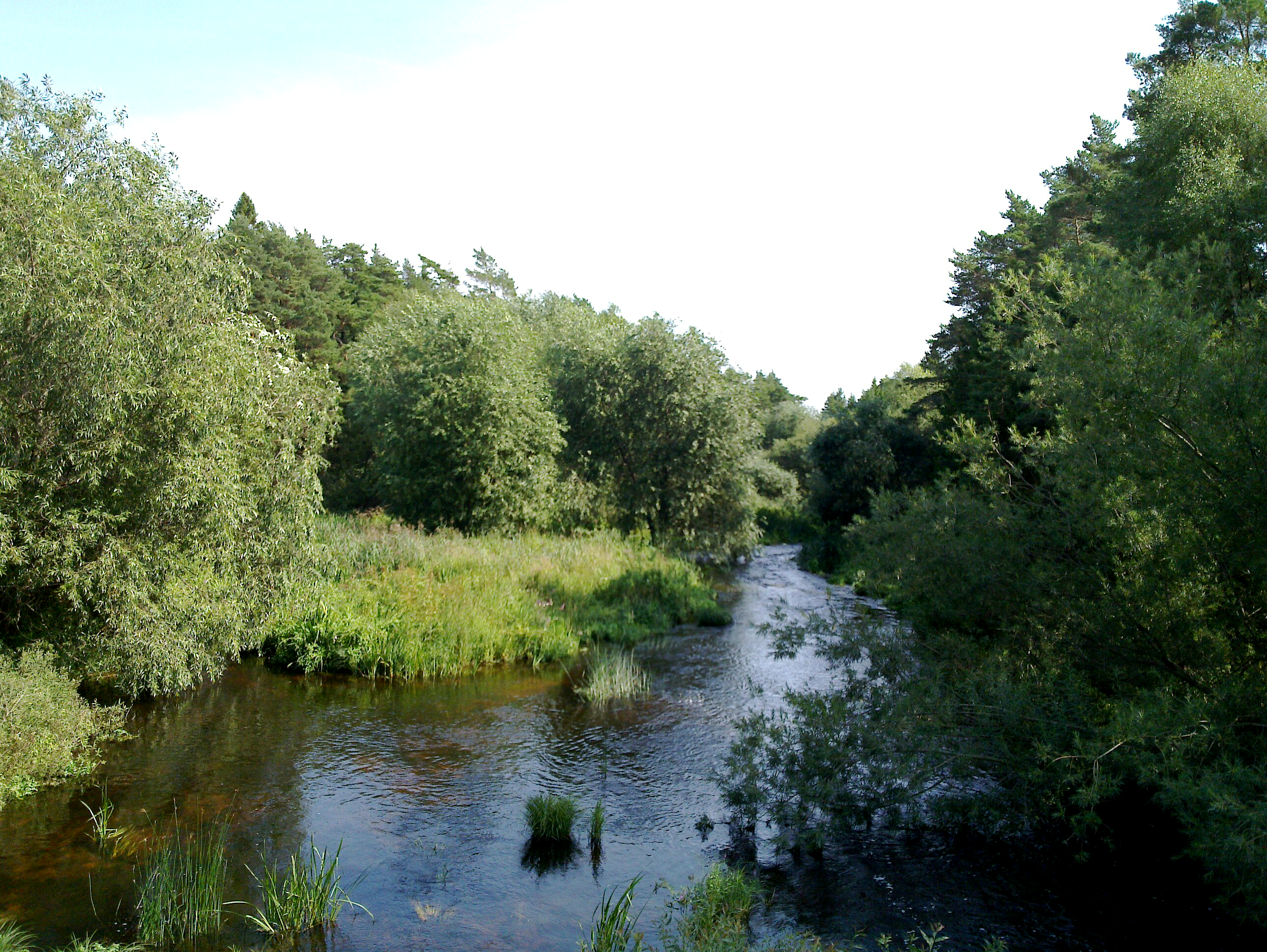

Location
- Country: Sweden
- County: Gotland
- Municipality: Gotland

Physical characteristics
- Mouth: Baltic Sea
  - location: Gothem
  - coordinates: 57°36′58″N 18°45′52″E
  - elevation: 0 m (0 ft)
- Basin size: 479.5 km^{2} (185.1 sq mi)

Gothemsån is a river on Gotland, Sweden. It's considered to be Gotland's largest river. It stretches between Lojsta Moor in the south and Hejnum in the north to the outflow in Åminne in Gothem.
