= Anders Göthberg =

Swedish musician

- Born: 9 October 1975
- Died: 30 March 2008 (aged 32) Stockholm, Sweden
- Genres: indiepop
- Occupation: musician
- Instrument: guitar
- Years active: 1990s–2008
- Label: Dolores Recordings
- Formerly of: Broder Daniel, Honey is Cool

Anders Göthberg (9 October 1975 – 30 March 2008) was a Swedish guitarist.

Göthberg played guitar for Broder Daniel and Honey Is Cool. He lived his latter life in Stockholm with his girlfriend, artist Paola Bruna. Göthberg died of suicide by jumping from Västerbron in Stockholm. A memorial to Broder Daniel was raised in August 2014 at the site of the band's last concert in Slottsskogen during the Way Out West Festival in 2008, during which the band reunited one last time in memory of Göthberg.
