= Iron Age Scandinavia =

Historical period in Scandinavia

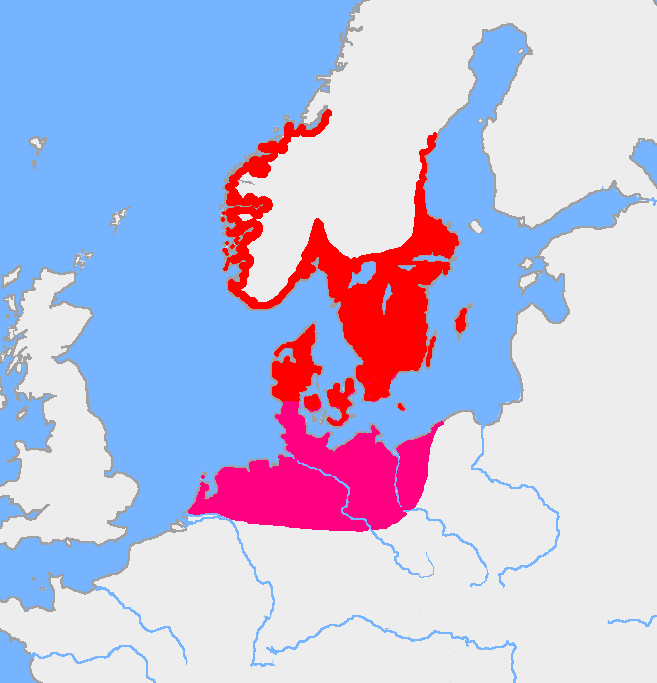
The Nordic Iron Age and Jastorf cultures

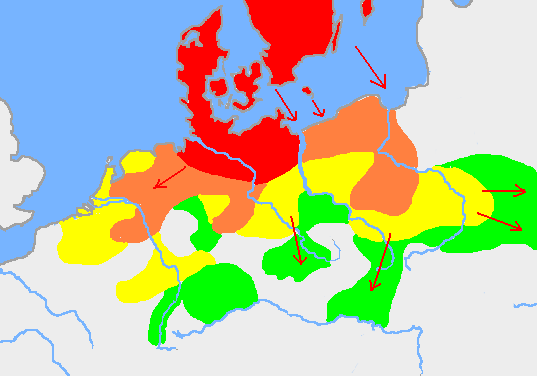
Expansion of early Germanic tribes into previously mostly Celtic Central Europe: Settlements before 750 BC New settlements by 500 BC New settlements by 250 BC New settlements by AD 1 Some sources also give a date of 750 BC for the earliest expansion out of southern Scandinavia and northern Germany along the North Sea coast towards the mouth of the Rhine.

Iron Age Scandinavia (or Nordic Iron Age) was the Iron Age, as it unfolded in Scandinavia. It was preceded by the Nordic Bronze Age.

== Beginnings ==
The 6th and 5th centuries BC were a tipping point for exports and imports on the European continent. The ever-increasing conflicts and wars between the central European Celtic tribes and the Mediterranean cultures destabilized old major trade routes and networks between Scandinavia and the Mediterranean, eventually breaking them down. Archaeology attests a rapid and deep change in the Scandinavian culture and way of life due to various reasons which have not yet been sufficiently analyzed. Agricultural production became more intensified, organized around larger settlements and with a much more labour-intensive production. Slaves were introduced and deployed, something uncommon in the Nordic Bronze Age. The rising power, wealth and organization of the central European tribes in the following centuries did not seem to instigate an increased trade and contact between Scandinavia and central Europe before 200‒100 BC. At this point the Celtic tribes had organized themselves in numerous urban communities known as oppida, and the more stable political situation in Europe allowed for a whole new economic development and trade.

Bronze could not be produced in Scandinavia, as tin was not a local natural resource, but with new techniques, iron production from bog iron (mostly in Denmark) slowly gained ground. Iron is a versatile metal and was suitable for tools and weapons, but it was not until the Viking Age that iron incited a revolution in ploughing. Previously, herds of livestock had pasture grazed freely in large wood pastures, but were now placed in stables, probably to utilize manure more efficiently and increase agricultural production. Even though the advent of the Iron Age in Scandinavia was a time of great crisis, the new agricultural expansions, techniques and organizations proceeded apace. And though the decline of foreign trade might suggest that the period marked a transition from a rich and wealthy culture to a poor and meagre one, the population grew and new technology was developed. The period might just reflect a change of culture and not necessarily a decline in standards of living.

== Periodization ==
The Iron Age in Scandinavia and Northern Europe begins around 500 BC with the Jastorf culture, and is taken to last until c. 800 AD and the beginning Viking Age. It succeeds the Nordic Bronze Age with the introduction of ferrous metallurgy by contact with the Hallstatt D/La Tène cultures.

- Pre-Roman Iron Age (5th to 1st centuries BC). There are many bog bodies from Danish bog areas, some ritually killed, perhaps as human sacrifices, of which Tollund Man (found 1950) is the best-known. Their hair, skin and possessions have often been preserved in the anaerobic conditions, allowing archaeologists to learn more about their lifestyle.
- Roman Iron Age (1st to 4th centuries AD)
- Germanic Iron Age (5th to 8th centuries AD)
  - Vendel era

The Northern European Iron Age is the locus of Proto-Germanic culture, in its later stage differentiating into Proto-Norse (in Scandinavia), and West Germanic (Ingvaeonic, Irminonic, Istvaeonic) in northern Germany.

== Culture and religion ==
Nordic Iron Age culture

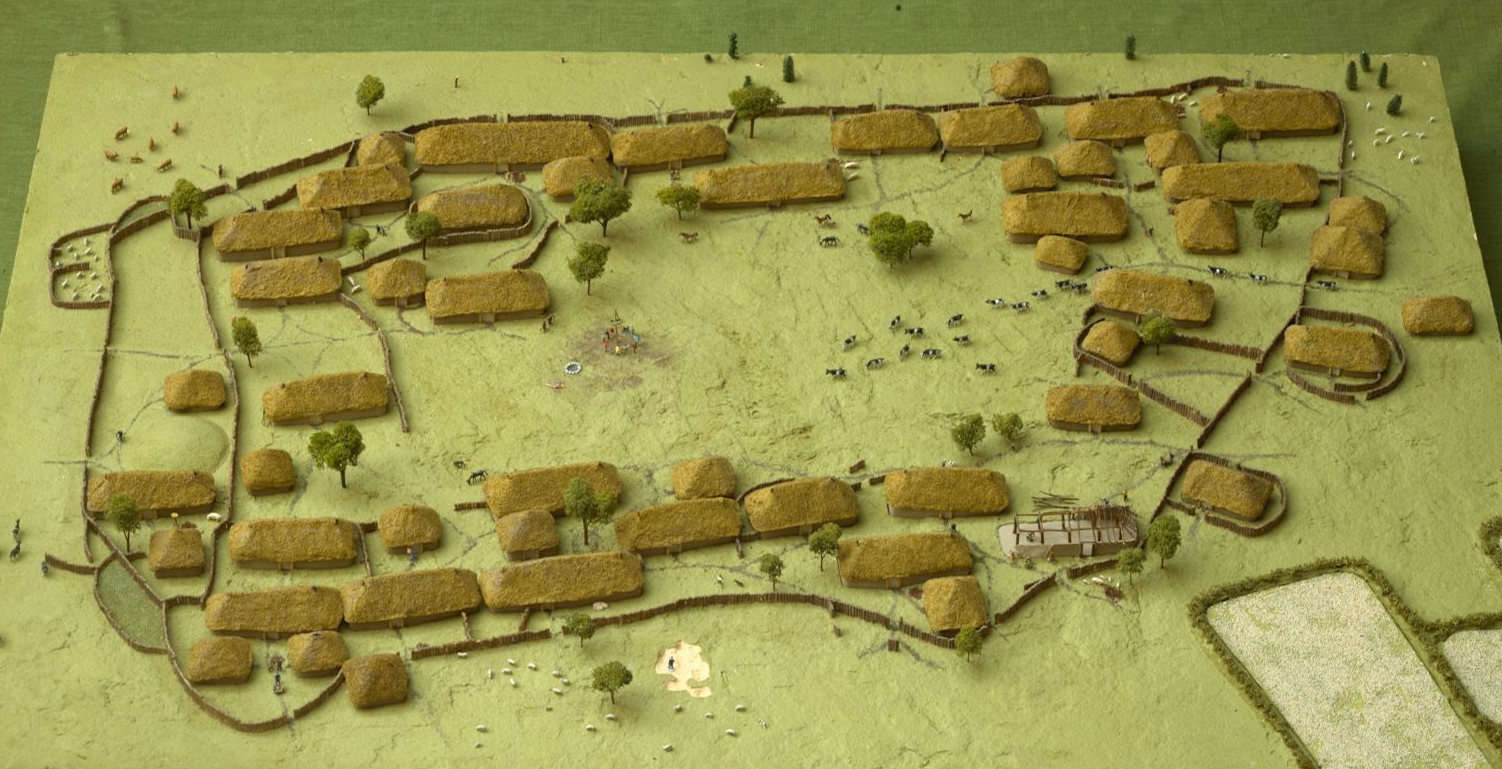
Model of Hodde Iron Age village, Denmark, c. 100 BC.

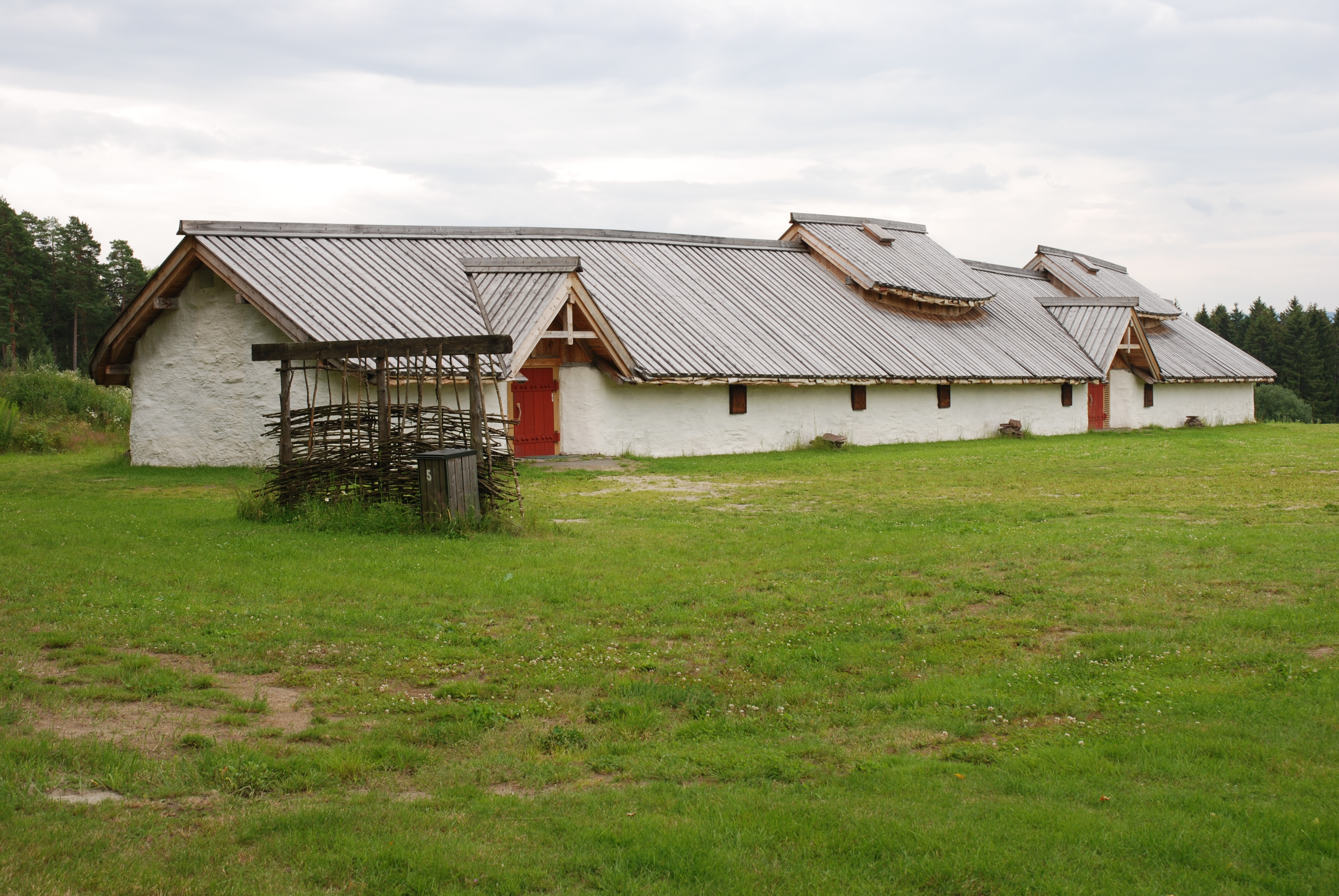
Reconstructed Iron Age hall at Veien, Norway. Roman Iron Age, 1st-2nd century AD.

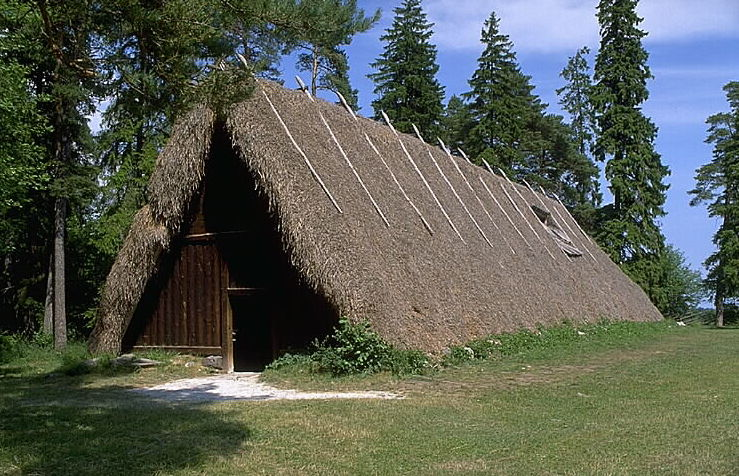
Lojsta Hall, a 30 x 16 m reconstructed hall from the Germanic Iron Age (Gotland, Sweden)

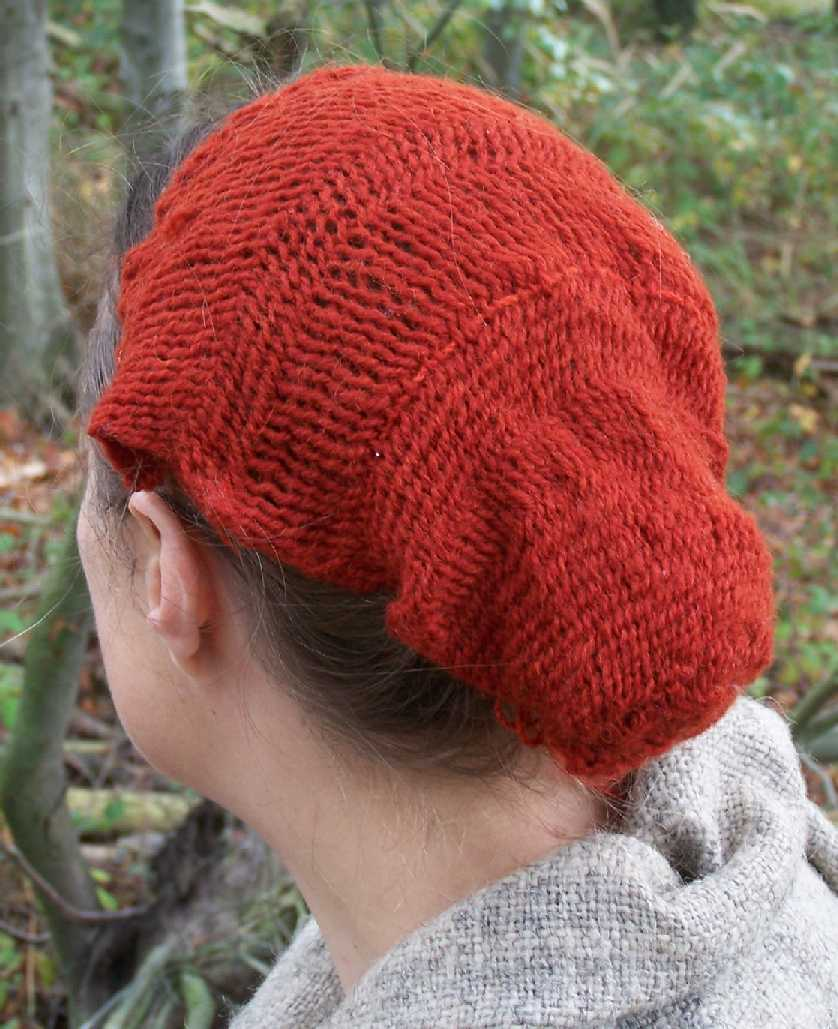
Women wore sprangs. A reconstructed hairnet from the Pre-Roman Iron Age (Arden Woman, Denmark)

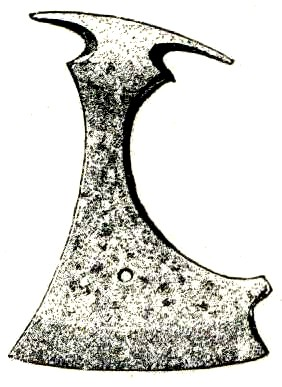
Iron axe head (Gotland, Sweden. Drawing from Nordisk familjebok, 1904–1926)

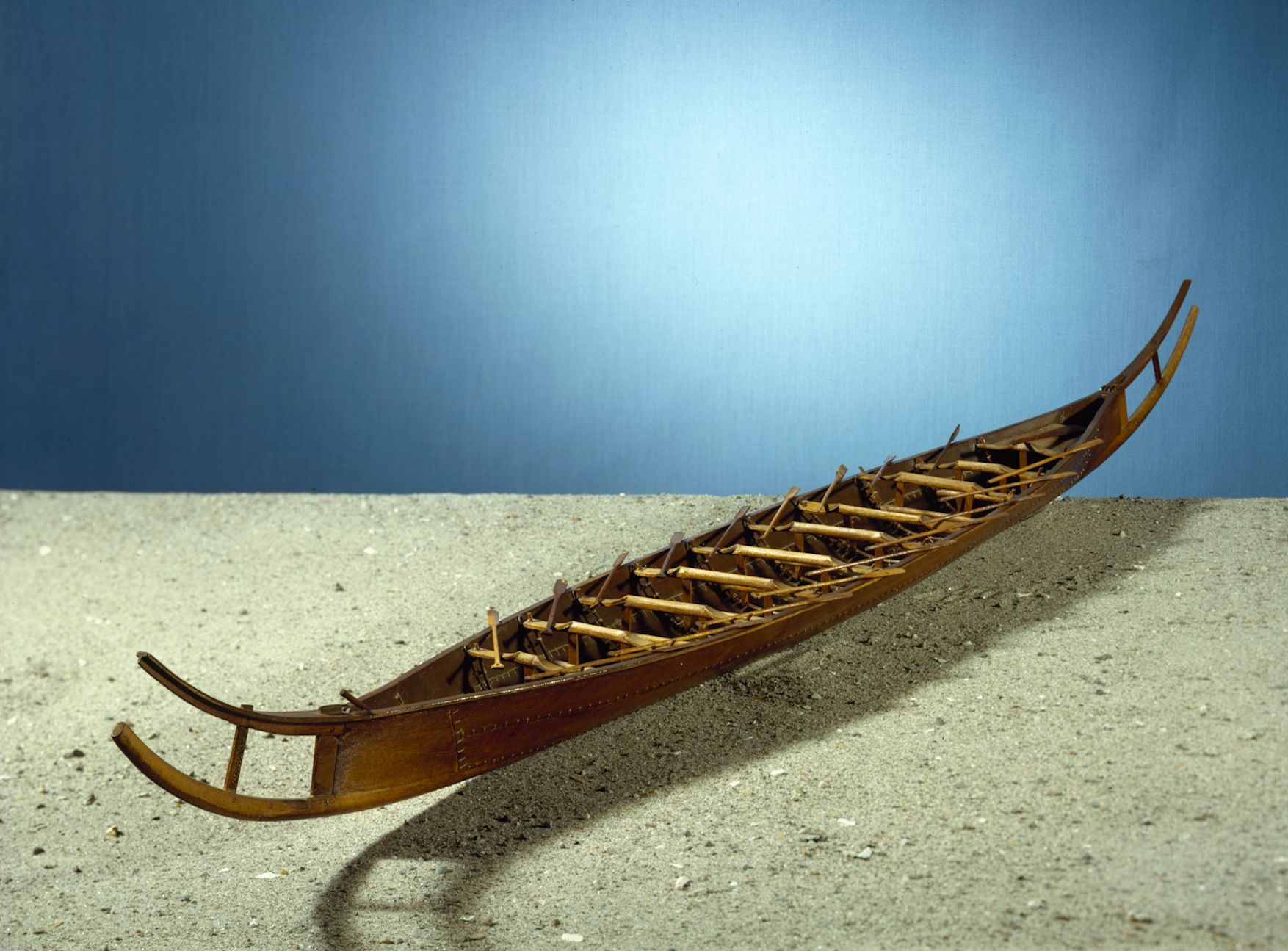
Nordic Iron Age boats (Hjortspring boat, Denmark), c. 400 BC

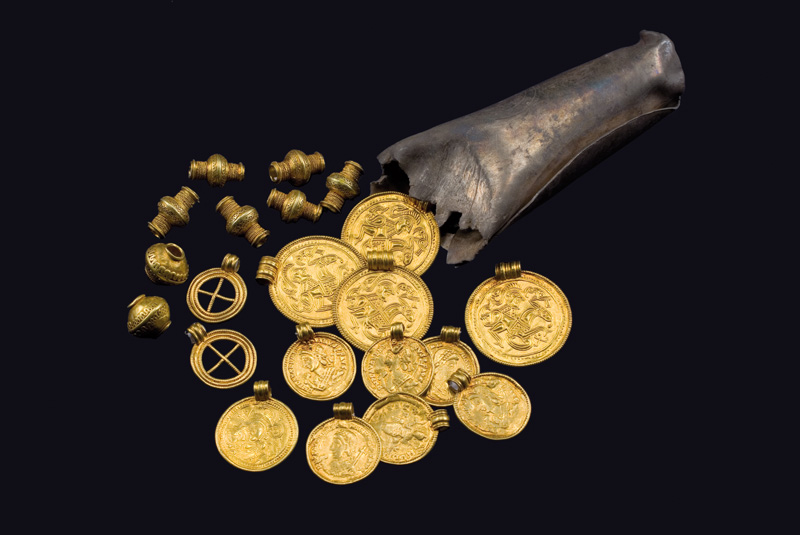
Bracteates (Bornholm, Denmark)

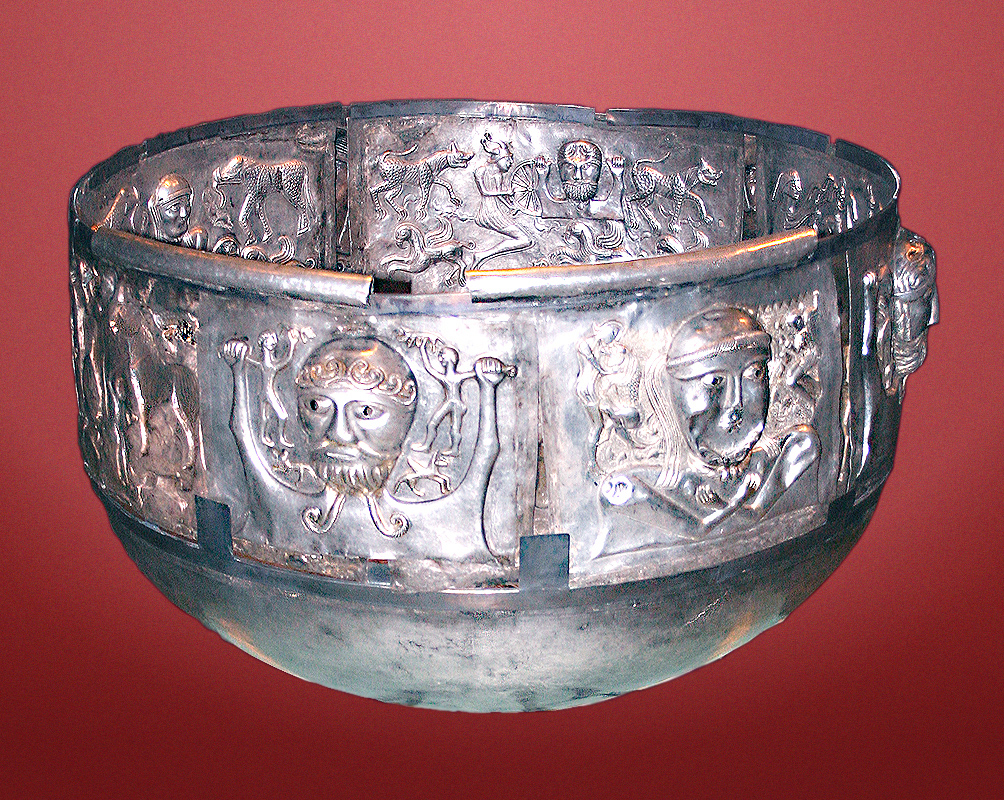
Ornamented cauldrons. The silver Gundestrup Cauldron from the Roman Iron Age (Aars, Denmark)

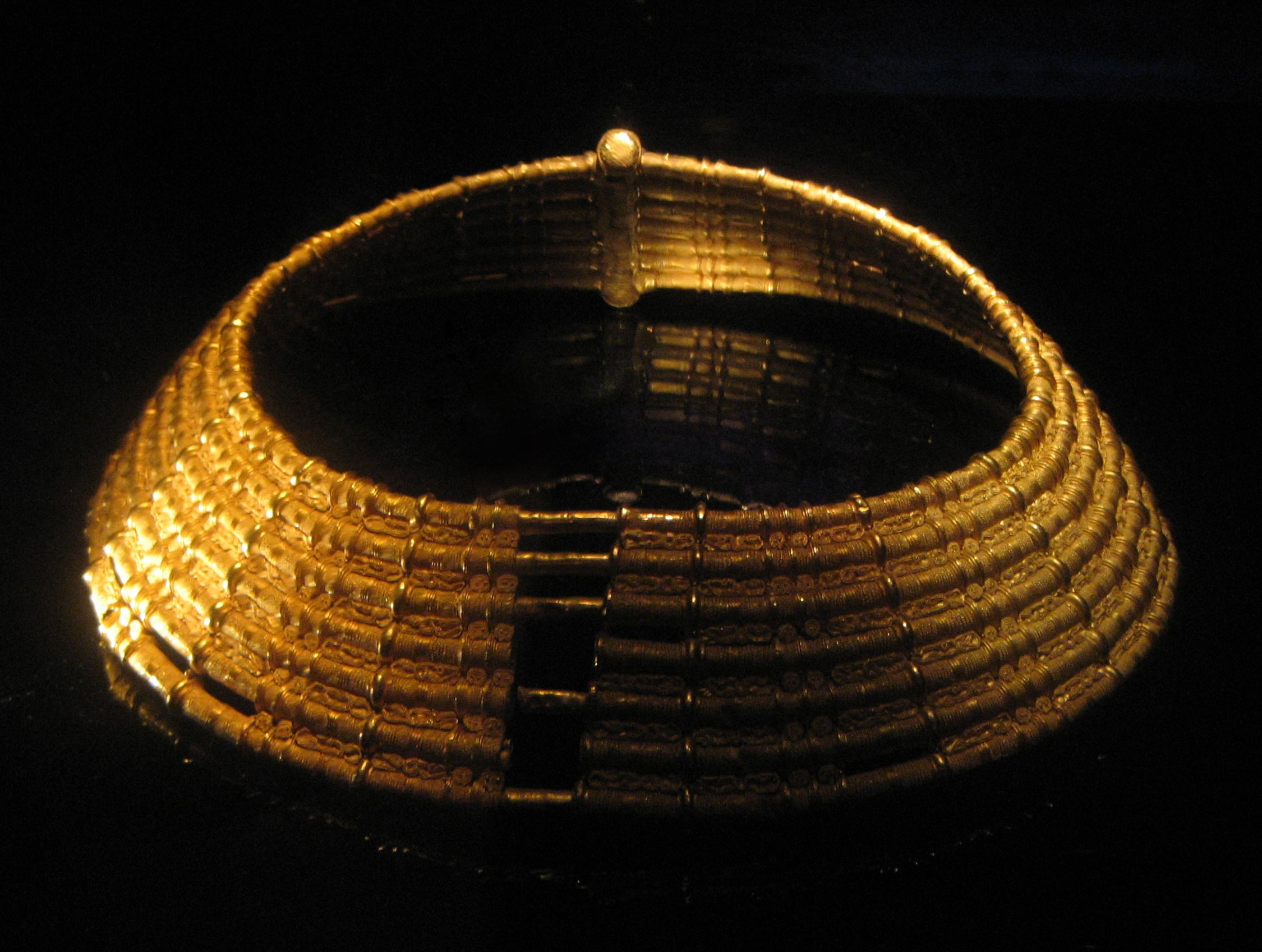
Golden necklaces. The Möne Collar from the Germanic Iron Age (Västergötland, Sweden)
Nordic Iron Age culture

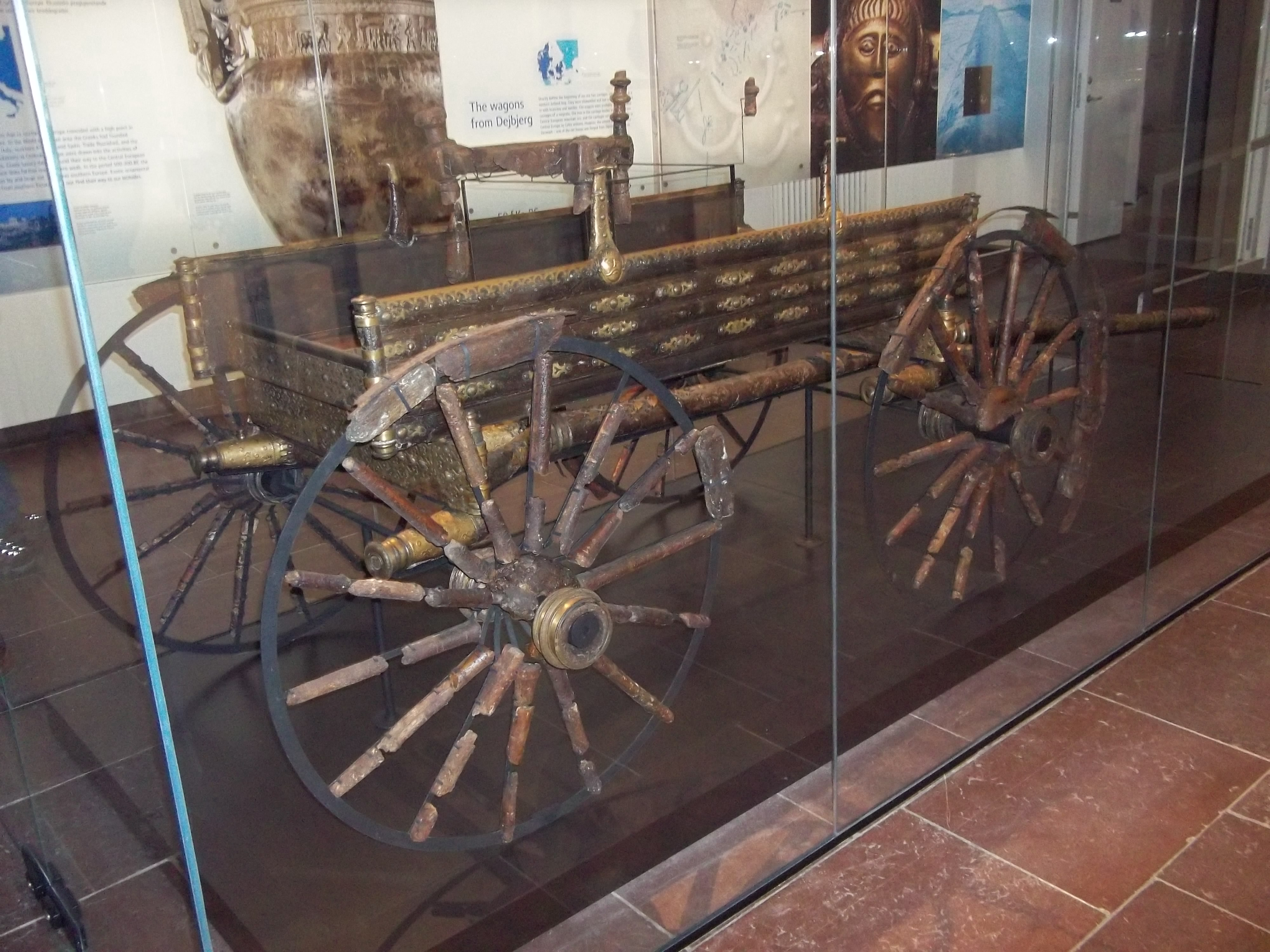
Ceremonial wagons. The Dejbjerg wagon from the Pre-Roman Iron Age (National Museum of Denmark)

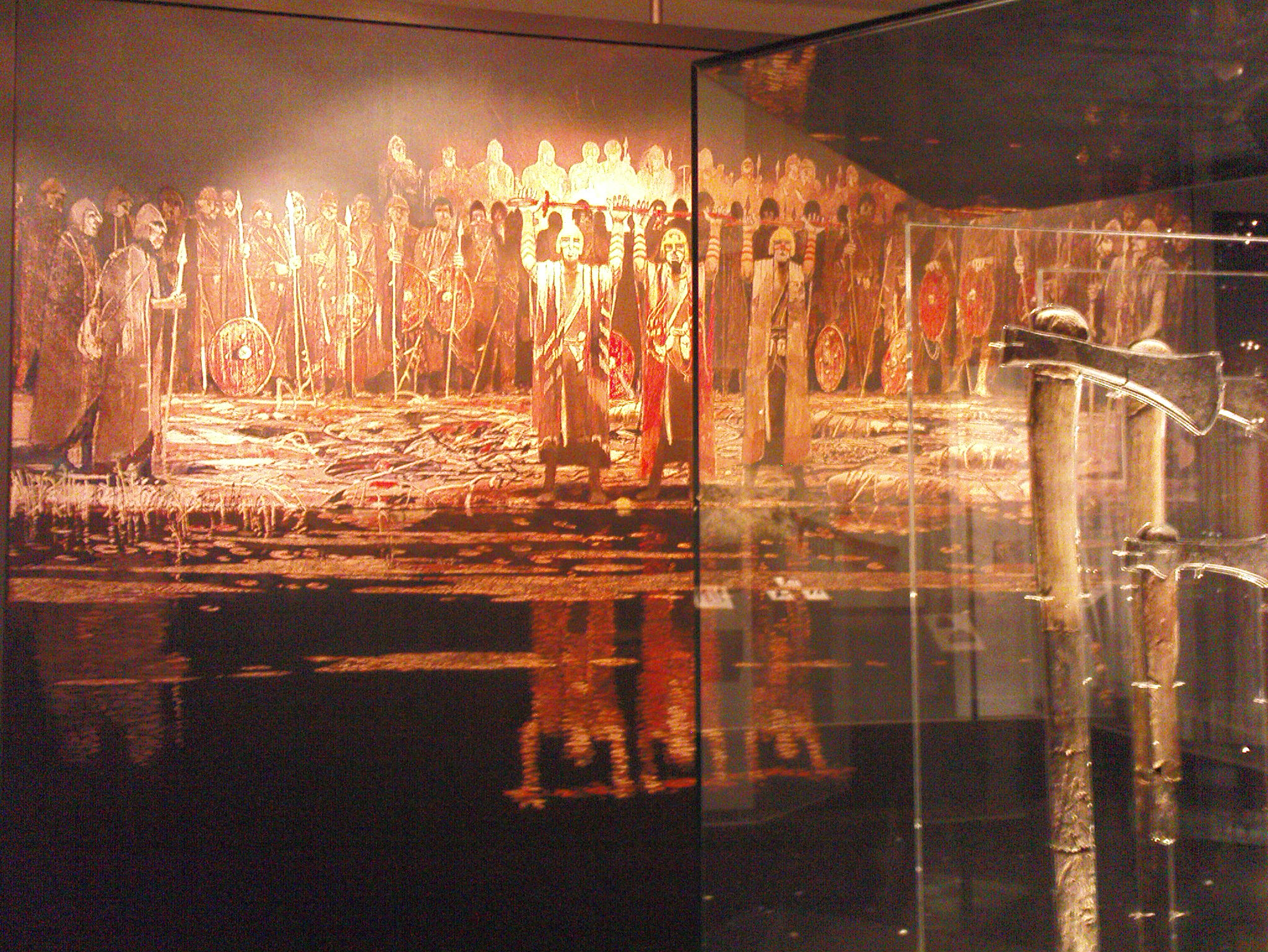
Votive offerings in bogs and bodies of water (Illerup Ådal, Denmark)

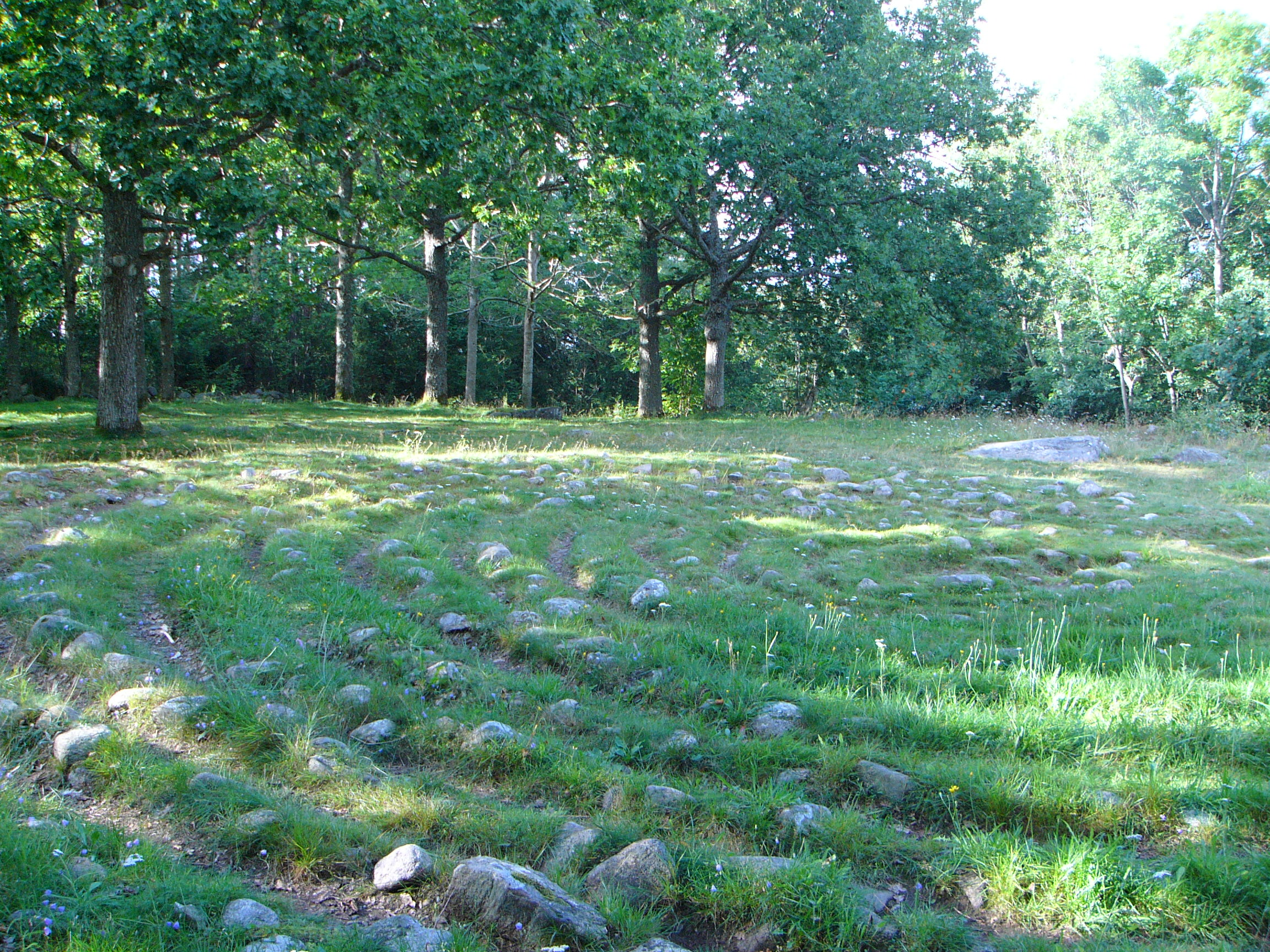
Stone and turf labyrinths (Bohuslän, Sweden)

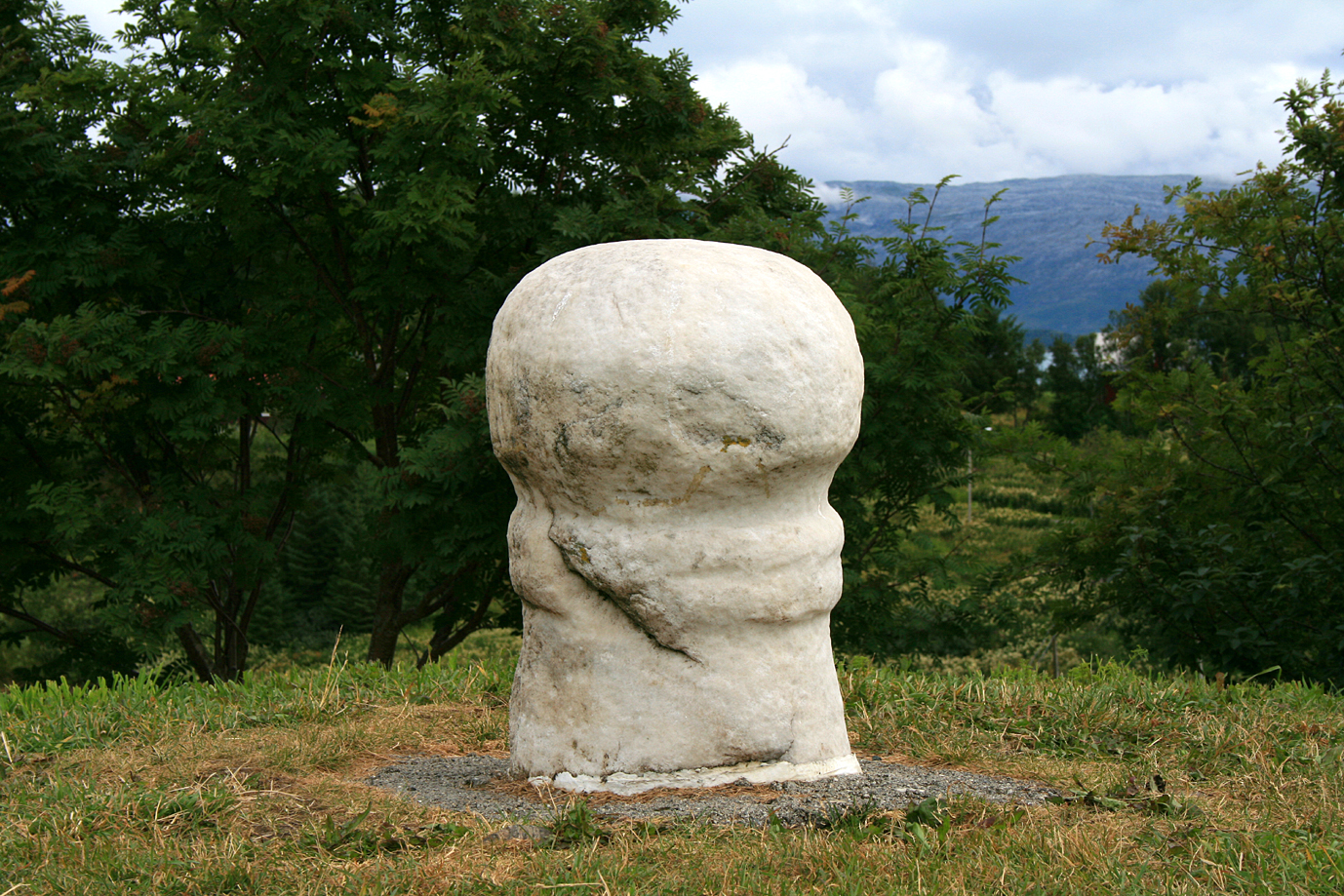
Fertility symbols. The Dønna Phallus in marble (Dønna, Norway)

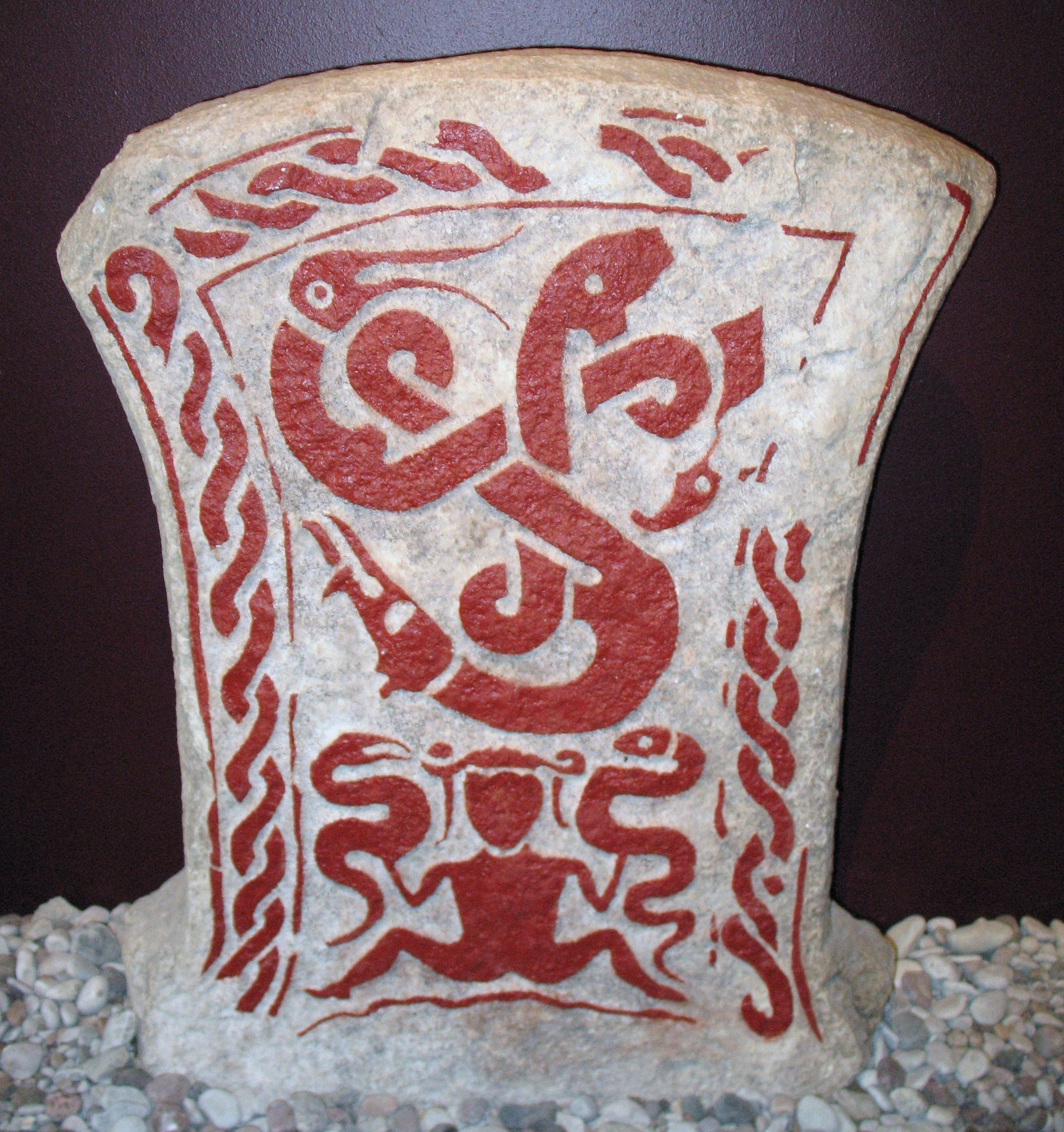
Picture stones. The snake-witch stone from the Germanic Iron Age (Gotland, Sweden)

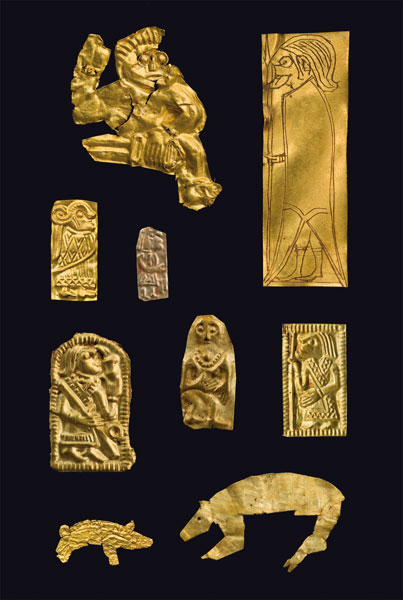
"Gullgubber": Symbolic golden leaves from the Germanic Iron Age (Bornholm, Denmark)

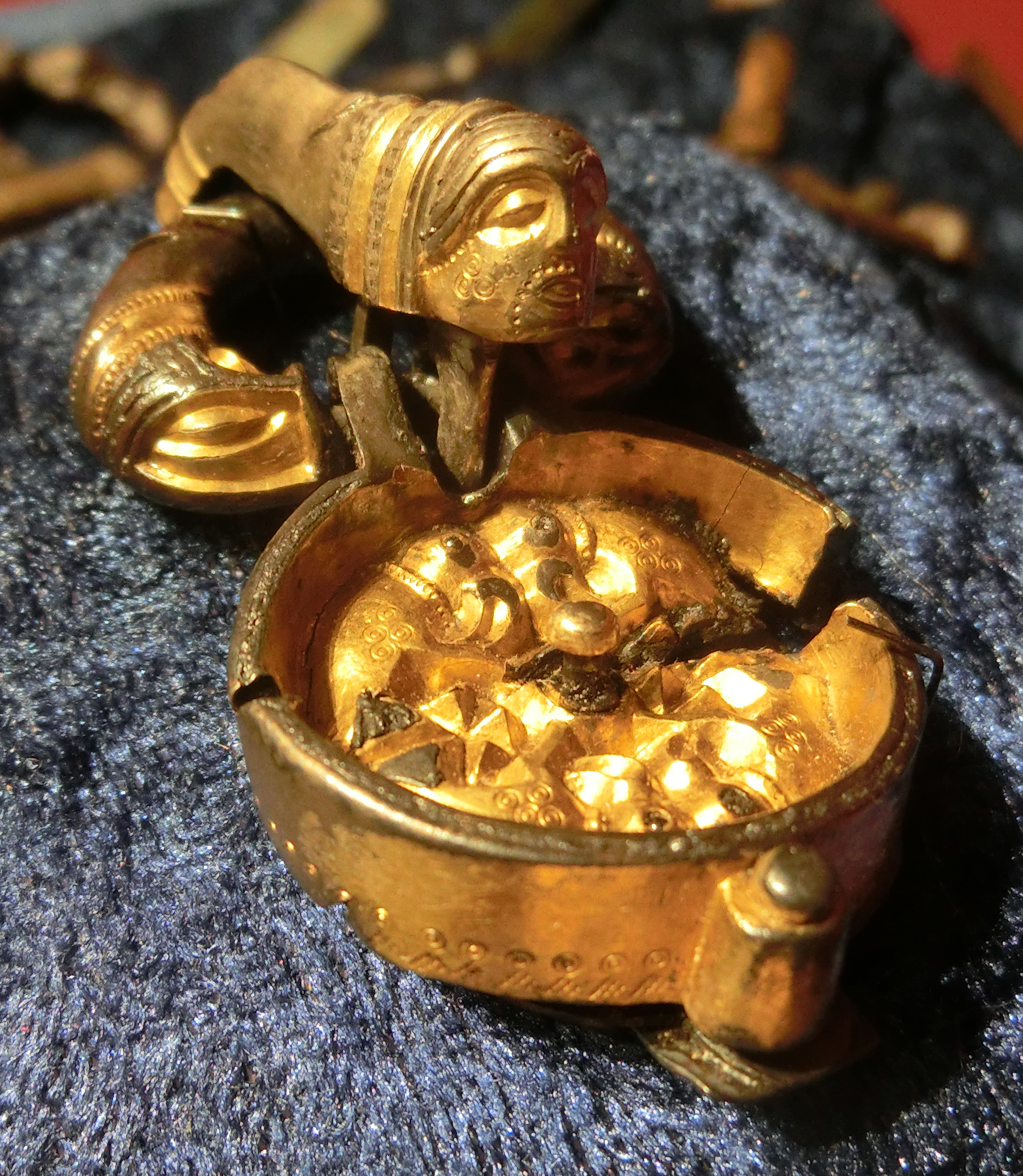
Amulets and fibula depicting Norse Gods (this one is Odin) from the Germanic Iron Age.

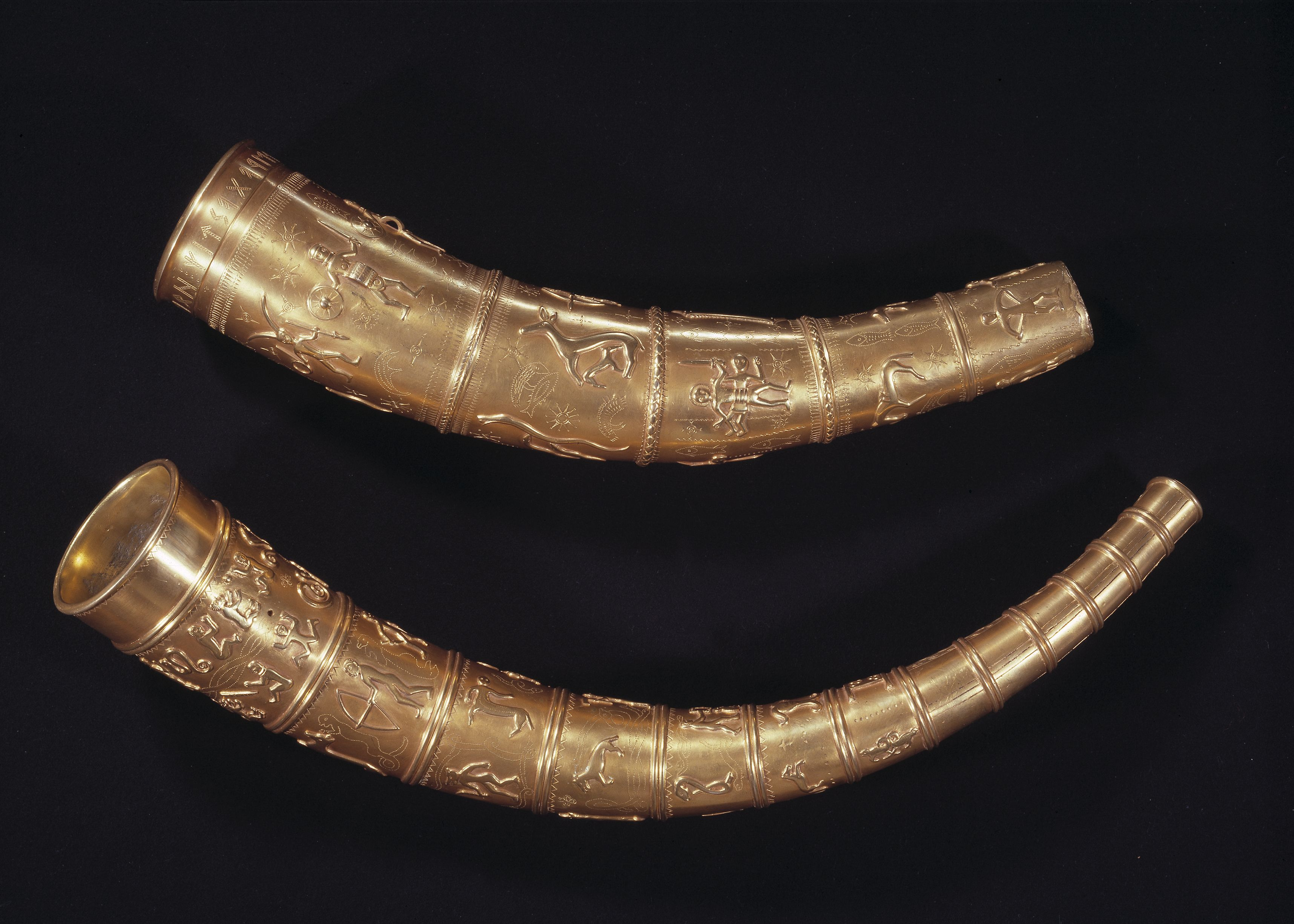
The Golden Horns of Gallehus from the early Germanic Iron Age (Møgeltønder, Denmark)

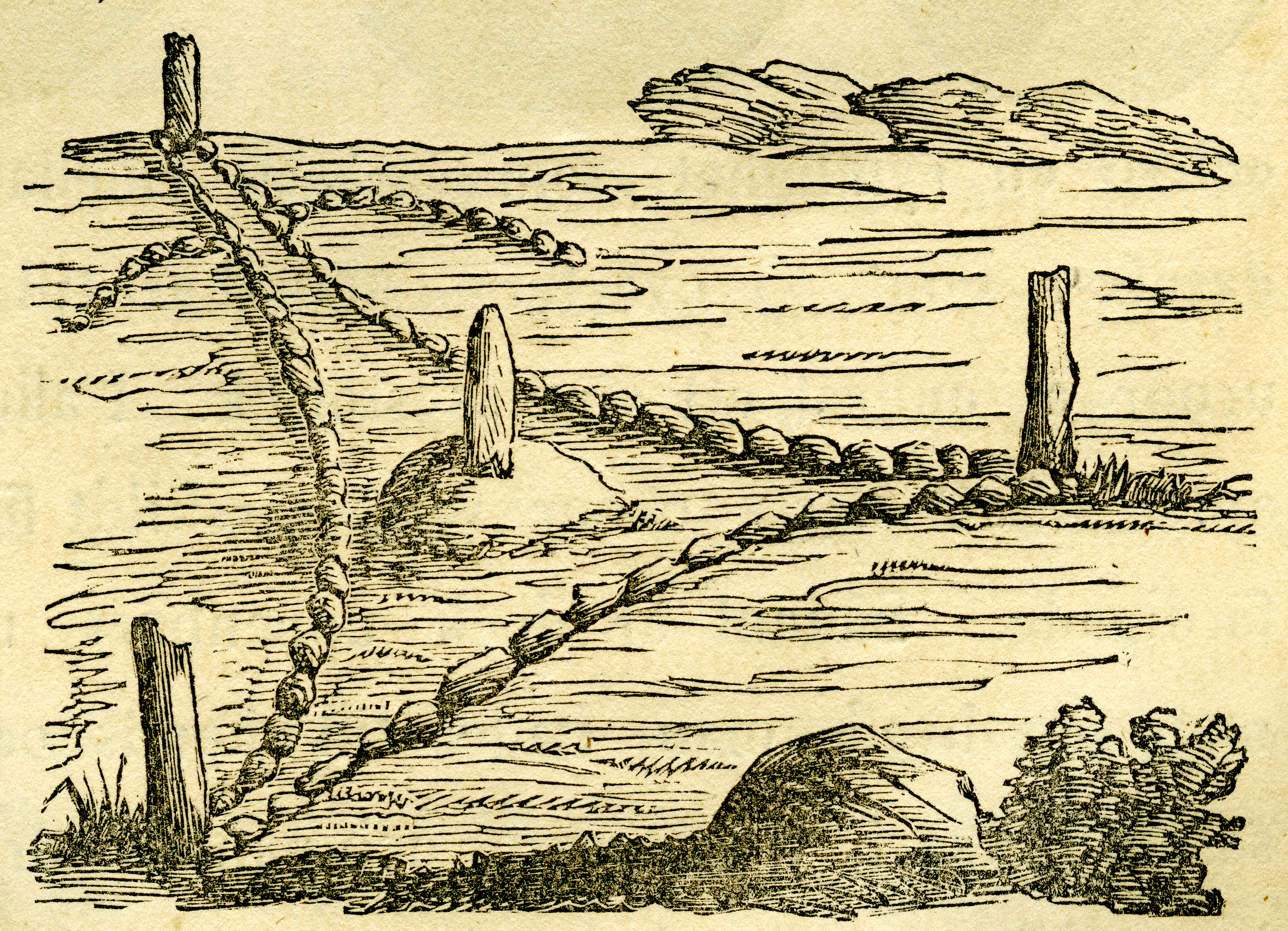
Triangular flat burial cairns (Drawing from the Swedish book Nordbon under hednatiden, 1852)

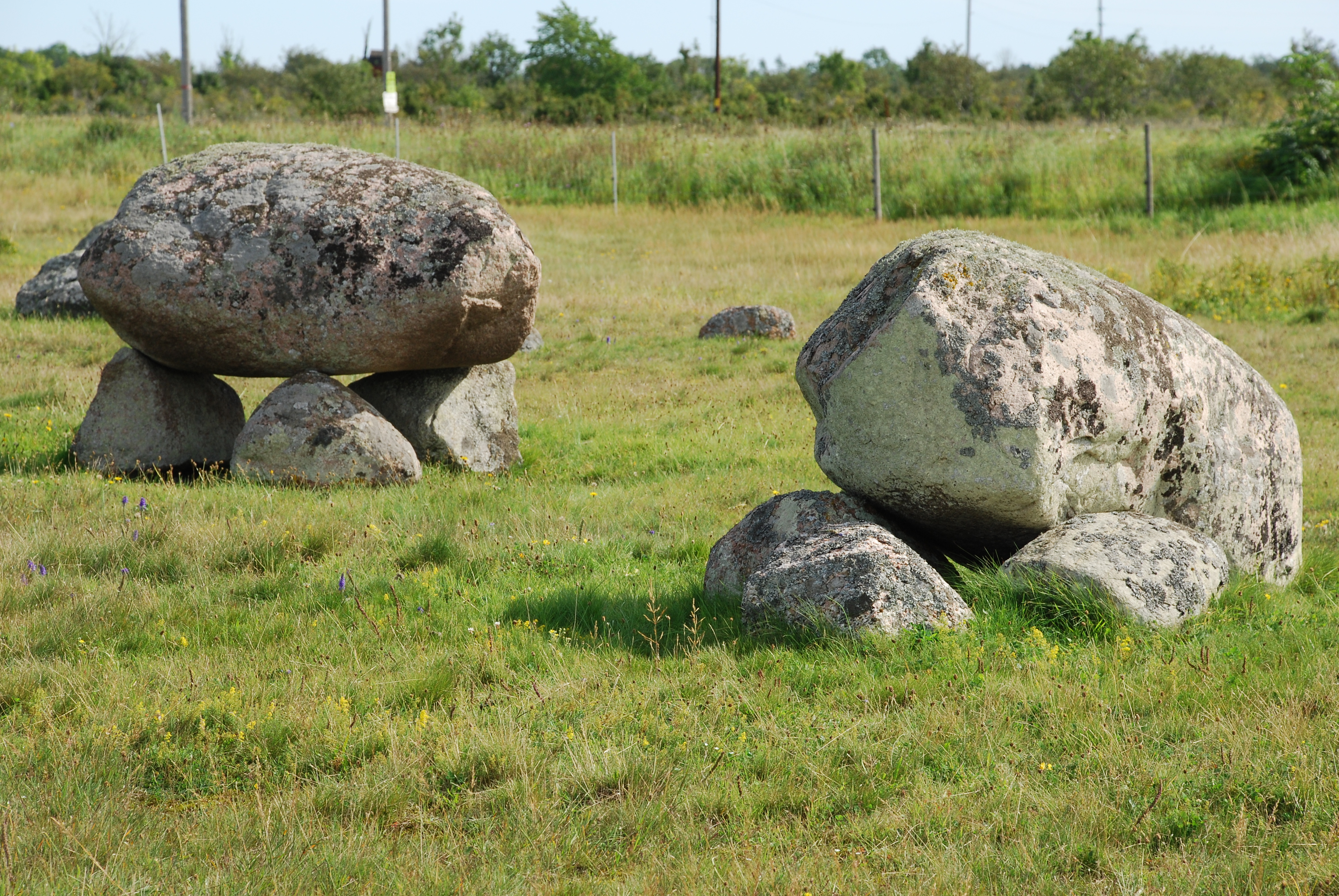
"Flying stones" grave fields (Öland, Sweden)

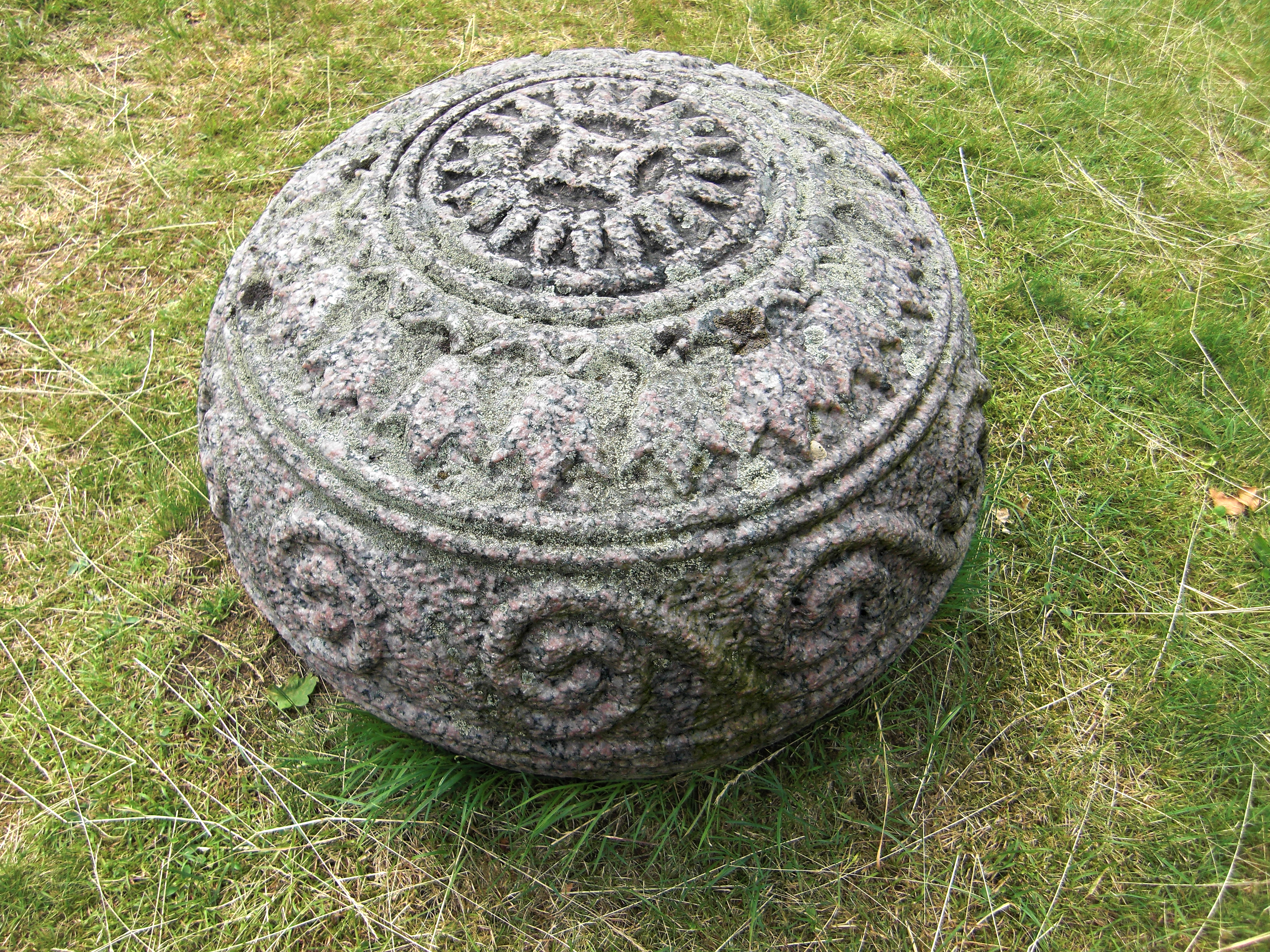
Stone grave orbs (Småland, Sweden)

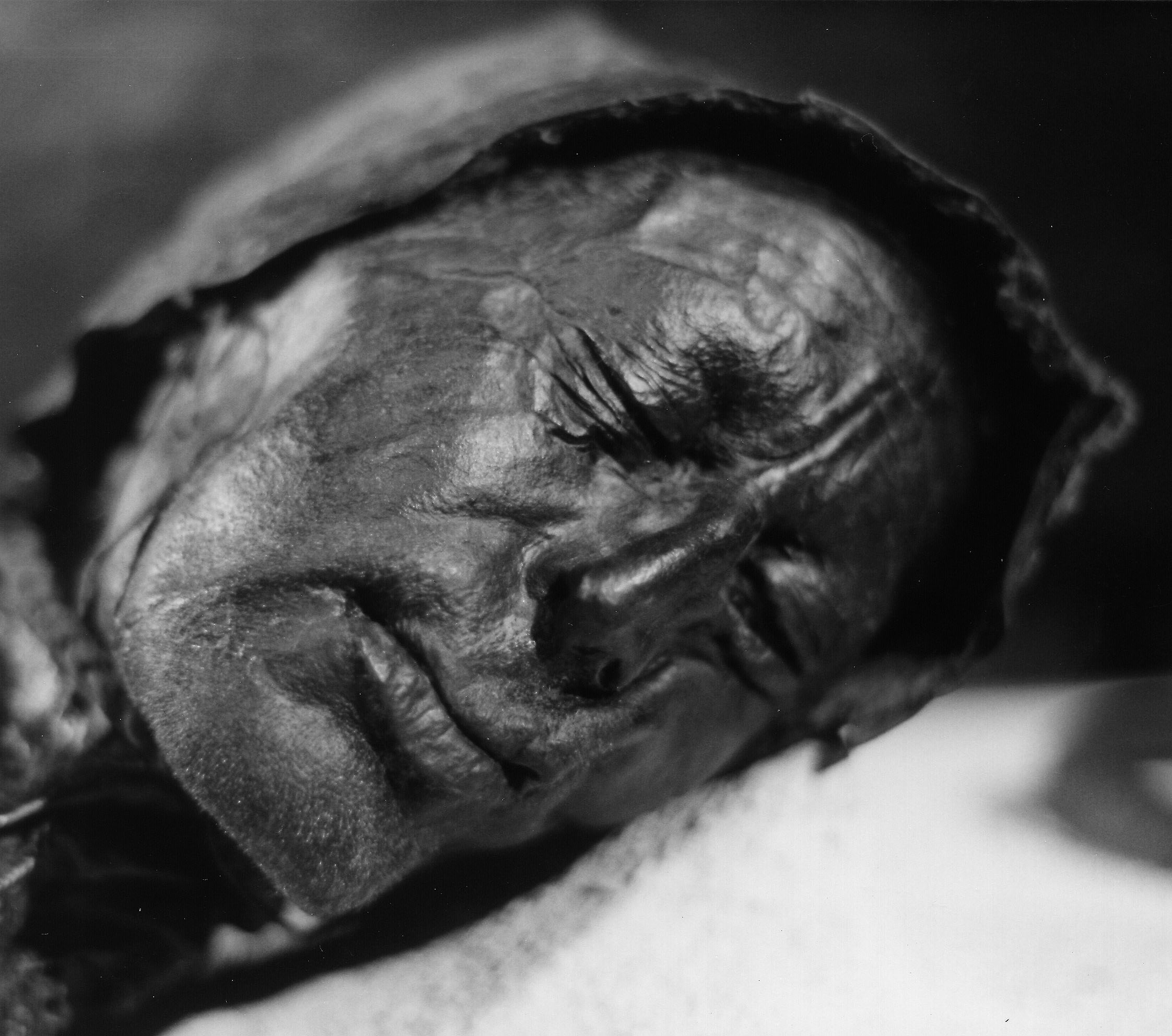
Mummified bog bodies. Tollund Man (Silkeborg, Denmark)

== See also ==
- British Iron Age
- Germanic Wars
- Migration period
- Proto-Germanic
- Proto-Norse

== Sources ==
- Jørgen Jensen (2002): I begyndelsen, Gyldendal og Politikens Danmarks Historie (Vol. 1), ISBN 87-89068-26-2 (in Danish)
- Bente Magnus, G Franceschi, Asger Jorn (2005): Men, Gods and Masks in Nordic Iron Age Art. OCLC 84747032.
- M Zvelebil (1985): Iron Age transformations in Northern Russia and the Northeast Baltic, Beyond Domestication in Prehistoric Europe
