= Slottsskogens djurpark =

Coordinates: 57°41′10″N 11°56′35″E

Slottskogens djurpark
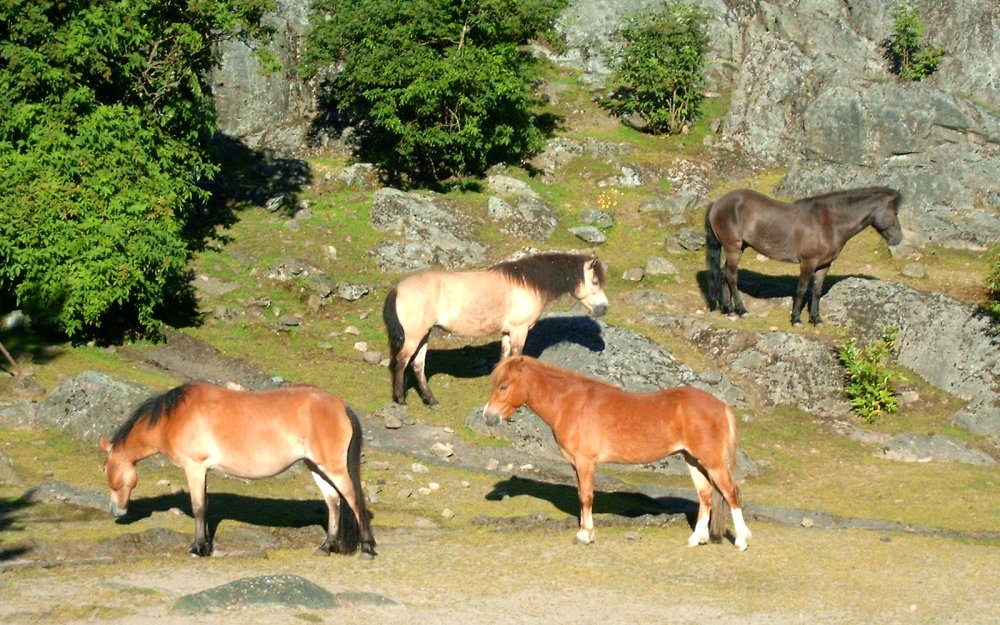
- Gotland ponies in the Slottsskogen zoo
- Interactive map of Slottskogens djurpark
- Date opened: 1874
- Location: Slottsskogen, Gothenburg, Sweden

Slottskogens djurpark is a Swedish zoo in the park Slottsskogen, located in the town of Gothenburg in Sweden. It is a member of the European Association of Zoos and Aquaria (EAZA).

Partially opened to public in 1876, Slottskogens djurpark is the oldest zoo in Sweden. There is no entrance fee charged.

Among the species displayed are Swedish animals, a pond with seals and penguins.

During summer season, a children zoo is open, where children can meet animals like goats, sheep and pigs.

== Animals ==
The zoo keeps several wild species of animals, primarily from the Nordic countries, such as moose, but also a species from further abroad such as penguins. In addition to wild animals, the zoo also works to conserve some traditional heritage breeds of Nordic domestic animals. In 2021, an old pond was remodelled to house the Swedish yellow duck (Sw. Svensk gul anka).

== Criticism ==
The long-lived zoo has not been without criticism. In August 2022, ahead of the 2022 Swedish general election, the spokesperson of the political party Feminist Initiative Teysir Subhi called for the zoo to be shut down by the municipal authorities of Gothenburg, arguing that the conditions faced by the animals were inhumane.
