= Broder Daniel discography =

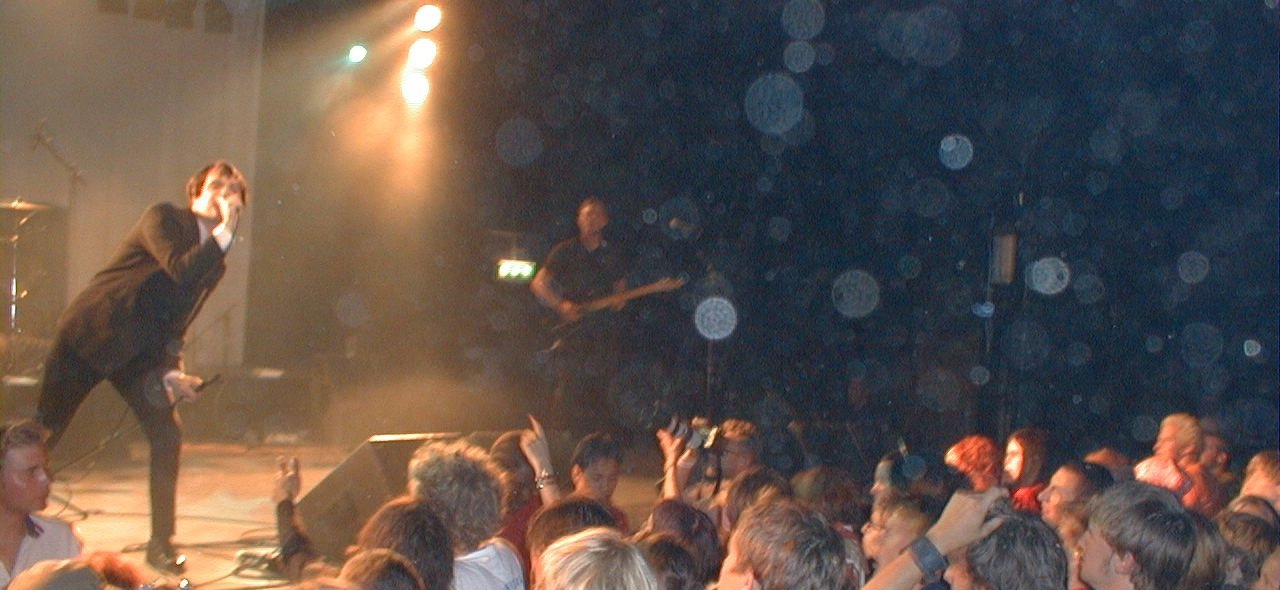
- Broder Daniel performing live
- Studio albums: 4
- Extended plays: 1
- Soundtrack albums: 3
- Compilation albums: 3
- Singles: 15
- Video albums: 1
- Music videos: 8

This article presents the discography of Swedish recording band Broder Daniel. Included are four studio albums, three compilation albums, fifteen singles and three soundtracks.

Their debut album was Saturday Night Engine in 1995.

They've been signed with EMI and then later Dolores Recordings.

== Studio albums ==
Year	Title
1995	Saturday Night Engine: Label: EMI; Released: 21 April 1995
1996	Broder Daniel: Label: EMI; Released: 22 April 1996
1998	Broder Daniel Forever: Label: Dolores Recordings; Released: 22 April 1998
2003	Cruel Town: Label: Dolores Recordings; Released: 2003

=== Saturday Night Engine ===
Saturday Night Engine

Studio album by Broder Daniel
- Released: 21 April 1995
- Recorded: 1994–1995
- Genres: Indie rock, indie pop, noise pop, garage rock
- Label: EMI
- Producers: Broder Daniel, Nille Perned

Broder Daniel chronology
Saturday Night Engine (1995)	Broder Daniel (1996)

Debut album. Released 21 April 1995.

No.	Title	Length
1.	"Lovesick"	3:20
2.	"Luke Skywalker"	3:27
3.	"Iceage"	2:58
4.	"Disease Inside"	3:26
5.	"What's Good"	2:41
6.	"The Kids Are Alright"	3:54
7.	"Come On You People"	2:23
8.	"Lost in Love"	3.46
9.	"Cadillac"	4:04
10.	"The Middleclass"	3:27
11.	"Son of S:t Jacobs"	3:52

=== Broder Daniel ===
Broder Daniel

Studio album by Broder Daniel
- Released: 22 April 1996
- Recorded: 1995–1996
- Genre: Indiepop
- Label: EMI

Broder Daniel chronology
Saturday Night Engine (1995)	Broder Daniel (1996)	Broder Daniel Forever (1998)

Second studio album. Released 22 April 1996. One year and one day after the release of their debut album.

No.	Title	Length
1.	"Underground"	2:51
2.	"Work"	3:33
3.	"ABC 123"	2:36
4.	"Upside Down and Inside Out"	3:29
5.	"Steel"	4:28
6.	"Sorrow"	3:03
7.	"Go My Own way"	2:50
8.	"Confusion"	2:19
9.	"Life Is a bubble"	2:43
10.	"The Young and the Old"	4:07

=== Broder Daniel Forever ===
Broder Daniel Forever

Studio album by Broder Daniel
- Released: 22 April 1998
- Recorded: 1997–1998
- Genre: Indiepop
- Label: Dolores Recordings

Broder Daniel chronology
Broder Daniel (1996)	Broder Daniel Forever (1998)	Cruel Town (2003)

Third studio album. Released 22 April 1998. Two years after their second studio album.

No.	Title	Length
1.	"I'll Be Gone"	3:38
2.	"Dark Heart"	2:51
3.	"Old in Just One Day"	2:58
4.	"You Bury Me"	3:12
5.	"Happy People Never Fantasize"	3:47
6.	"Whirlwind"	4:37
7.	"The Name Is Broder Daniel"	2:38
8.	"Love Doesn't Last"	3:24
9.	"Dream My Days Away"	3:42
10.	"No Time for Us"	4:21

=== Cruel Town ===
Cruel Town

Studio album by Broder Daniel
- Released: 2003
- Recorded: 2003
- Genre: Indiepop
- Length: 42:31
- Label: Dolores Recordings
- Producers: Broder Daniel, Mattias Glavå

Broder Daniel chronology
Broder Daniel Forever (1998)	Cruel Town (2003)

Released 2003.

No.	Title	Length
1.	"Cruel Town"	3:59
2.	"Shoreline"	4:20
3.	"When We Were Winning"	4:46
4.	"Dark Star"	3:29
5.	"Burn Heart Burn"	3:23
6.	"Hardened Heart"	3:14
7.	"Army of Dreamers"	3:24
8.	"Only Life I Know"	3:32
9.	"Out of This Town"	3:56
10.	"Dump for Broken Dreams"	3:30
11.	"What Clowns Are We"	5:06

== Compilation albums ==
Year	Title
2000	Singles
2005	No Time for Us (1989–2004)
2009	Singles

=== Singles ===
Singles

Compilation album by Broder Daniel
- Released: January 2000
- Genre: Indiepop

No.	Title	Length
1.	"Cadillac"
2.	"Go My Own Way"
3.	"Hospital"
4.	"Iceage"
5.	"Lemon"
6.	"Luke Skywalker"
7.	"Misery and Harmony"
8.	"Mr. Cloudman"
9.	"No One Listens to No One Else"
10.	"On the Count 2 3"
11.	"What's Good"
12.	"Work"
13.	"You Split the Night"

=== No Time For Us (1989–2004) ===
No Time for Us (1989–2004)

Compilation album by Broder Daniel
- Released: 2005
- Recorded: 1989–2004
- Genre: Indiepop

CD1
No.	Title	Length
1.	"Luke Skywalker"
2.	"Iceage"
3.	"Work" (Uncut version)"
4.	"Underground"
5.	"ABC 123"
6.	"Go My Own Way"
7.	"I'll Be Gone"
8.	"You Bury Me"
9.	"Whirlwind"
10.	"Happy People Never Fantasize"
11.	"Dream My Days Away"
12.	"When We Were Winning"
13.	"Cruel Town"
14.	"Shoreline"
15.	"Army of Dreamers"
16.	"What Clowns Are We"
17.	"When We Were Winning (long version)"

CD2
No.	Title	Length
1.	"Son of S:t Jacobs (demo -89)"
2.	"Luke Skywalker (demo -93)"
3.	"Cadillac (demo -93)"
4.	"Lovesick (demo -93)"
5.	"Sitting Out in the Cold (demo -93)"
6.	"The Kids Are Alright (porta demo 940418)"
7.	"Lost in Love (porta demo 940418)"
8.	"Come On You People (porta demo 940418)"
9.	"You're My Valentine (demo 940509)"
10.	"Disease Inside (demo 940509)"
11.	"Lemon (T & A demo -94)"
12.	"On My Own (T & A demo -96)"
13.	"Love Doesn't Last (demo -97)"
14.	"I'll Be Gone (demo -97)"
15.	"Whirlwind (demo -97)"
16.	"Old in Just One Day (demo -97)"
17.	"Shoreline (demo -01)"
18.	"No Time for Us (acoustic)"

=== Singles ===
Singles

Compilation album by Broder Daniel
- Released: 2009
- Genre: Indiepop

No.	Title	Length
1.	"Cadillac"
2.	"On the Count"
3.	"Luke Skywalker"
4.	"What's Good (2)"
5.	"Iceage"
6.	"You Split the Night"
7.	"Mr. Cloudman"
8.	"Work"
9.	"Misery and Harmony"
10.	"Go My Own Way"
11.	"Lemon"
12.	"No One Listens to No One Else"
13.	"Hospital"
14.	"I'll Be Gone"
15.	"You Bury Me"
16.	"Sitting Outside in the Cold"
17.	"Happy People Never Fantasize"
18.	"On My Own"
19.	"When We Were Winning"
20.	"Shoreline"
21.	"What Clowns Are We"

== Singles ==
Year	Title	SWE
1995	Cadillac	
1995	Luke Skywalker	
1995	Iceage	
1996	Go my own way	
1996	Work	43
1998	I'll be Gone	60
1998	You bury me	
1998	Fucking Åmål theme: Underground	30
1998	Fucking Åmål theme: Whirlwind	
1999	Happy People Never Fantasize	
2003	When We Were Winning	1
2003	Cruel Town. Promo, snippet	
2004	Shoreline	20
2004	What Clowns Are We	46
2005	Luke Skywalker 7"	

== Video albums ==
Year	Title
2004	Army of Dreamers

== Music videos ==
Year	Title
	"Luke Skywalker"
	"Cadillac"
	"Work"
	"I'll Be Gone"
	"Underground"
	"Shoreline"
	"When We Were Winning"
	"What Clowns Are We"

== Soundtracks ==
Year	Song	Film
1998	"Whirlwind"	Show Me Love
1998	"I'll Be Gone"	Show Me Love
1998	"Underground"	Show Me Love
