= Lojsta =

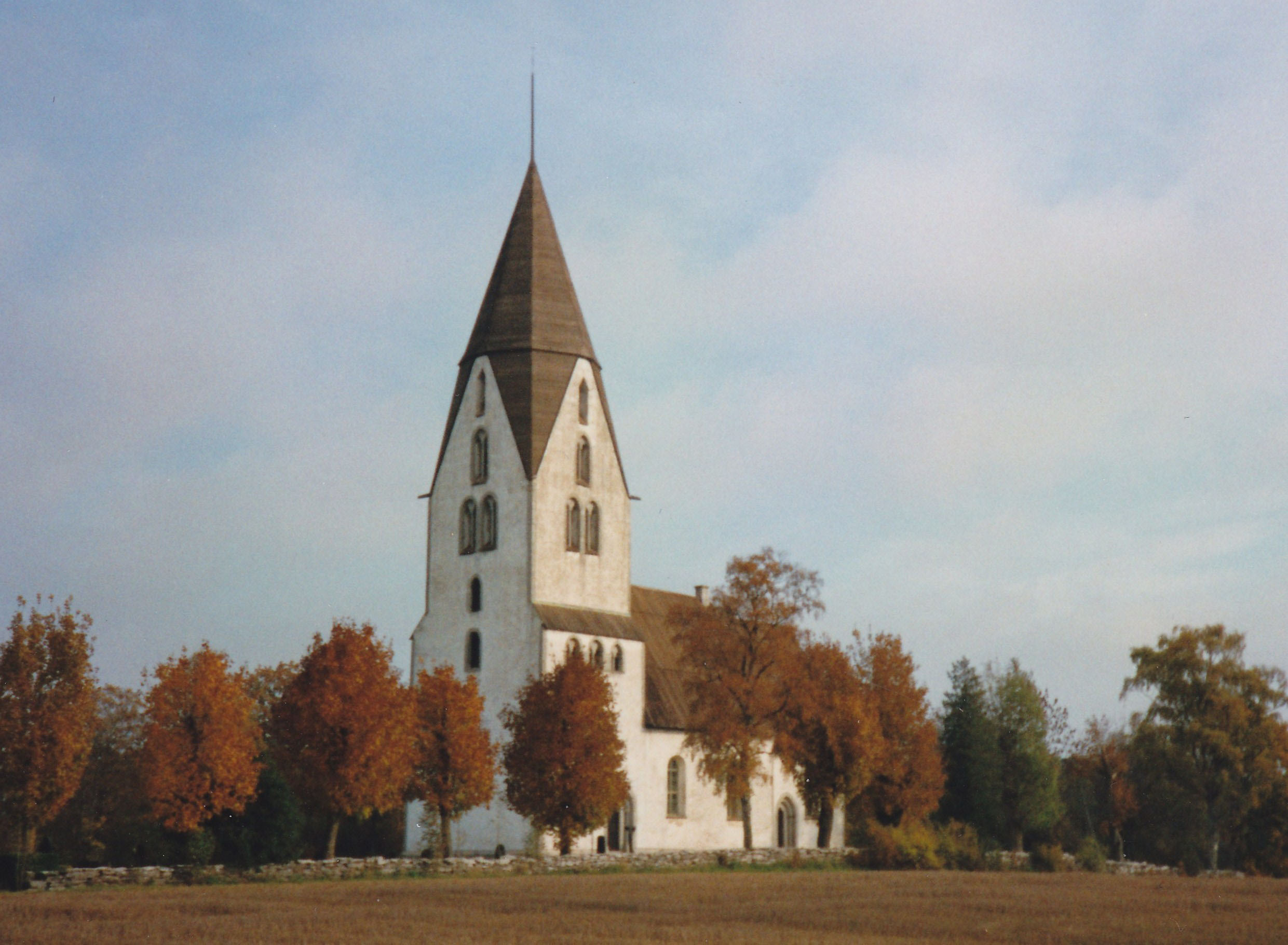
- Lojsta Church

- Location within Gotland
- Coordinates: 57°18′46″N 18°23′2″E
- Country: Sweden
- Province: Gotland
- County: Gotland County
- Municipality: Gotland Municipality

Area
  - Total: 22 km^{2} (8.5 sq mi)

Population (2014)
  - Total: 103
- Time zone: UTC+1 (CET)
  - Summer (DST): UTC+2 (CEST)

Lojsta is a populated area, a socken (not to be confused with parish), on the Swedish island of Gotland. It comprises the same area as the administrative Lojsta District, established on 1 January 2016.

The rift valley landscape of Lojsta is unusual for Gotland and the area contains the highest point, as well as some of the deepest lakes, on the island. Sweden's only native wild ponies have their natural habitat in an animal reserve in Lojsta.

== Geography ==
Lojsta is the name of a larger area surrounding medieval Lojsta Church, the Lojsta socken. Lojsta is north of Hemse in the middle of southern Gotland. The forested north part of the socken, the Lojsta Heath, contains the highest hills on Gotland. The highest point has an elevation of 83 m (272 ft). The southern part of Lojsta has farmed land in the valleys between the limestone cliffs. In the east, the landscape is peculiar for Gotland, with high almost vertical cliffs by the Lojsta Lakes.

The Tonnklint Nature Reserve and the Lojsta prästänge are situated in Lojsta.

As of 2019, Lojsta Church belongs to Lojsta parish in Fardhems pastorat.

=== Lojsta Moor ===
The main part of this forested moor is in Lojsta, but it also reaches into the neighboring Etelhem, Klinte and Fröjel sockens. The area is mainly gravel and sand deposited there by the moving ice sheet during the latest Ice age. 650 ha (1,600 acres) of the moor is classified as an animal reserve for the wild Gotland ponies (Gotlandsrussen) living there. These ponies are the only breed of ponies native to Sweden.

== Etymology ==
The name comes from lojst or lojstar, which means "flat land", "flat barren plain". However, it is uncertain which place it refers to.

== History ==
Lojsta dates back to Medieval times. It was originally part of the Fardhem thing, which in turn was in the southernmost of the three original districts (similar to ridings) that Gotland was divided into during the Middle Ages. In 1862, it became an independent municipality. In 1952, it was incorporated into the Hemse municipality and in 1971, all of Gotland became one municipality. The boatswains from Lojsta under the allotment system, were part of the Second Gotlandic Boatswains Company.

There are several small grave fields from the Iron Age in Lojsta as well as house foundations, collapsed stone walls and stones with grooves. Two rune inscriptions have been found by the church and one Viking silver treasure as well as a gold bracteate have also been found within the socken. Although named after Lojsta, the defence-structure Lojsta Castle and the Lojsta Hall, a reconstruction of an Iron Age longhouse, are situated in the neighboring Stånga socken.
