= Lojsta Church =

- Lojsta kyrka
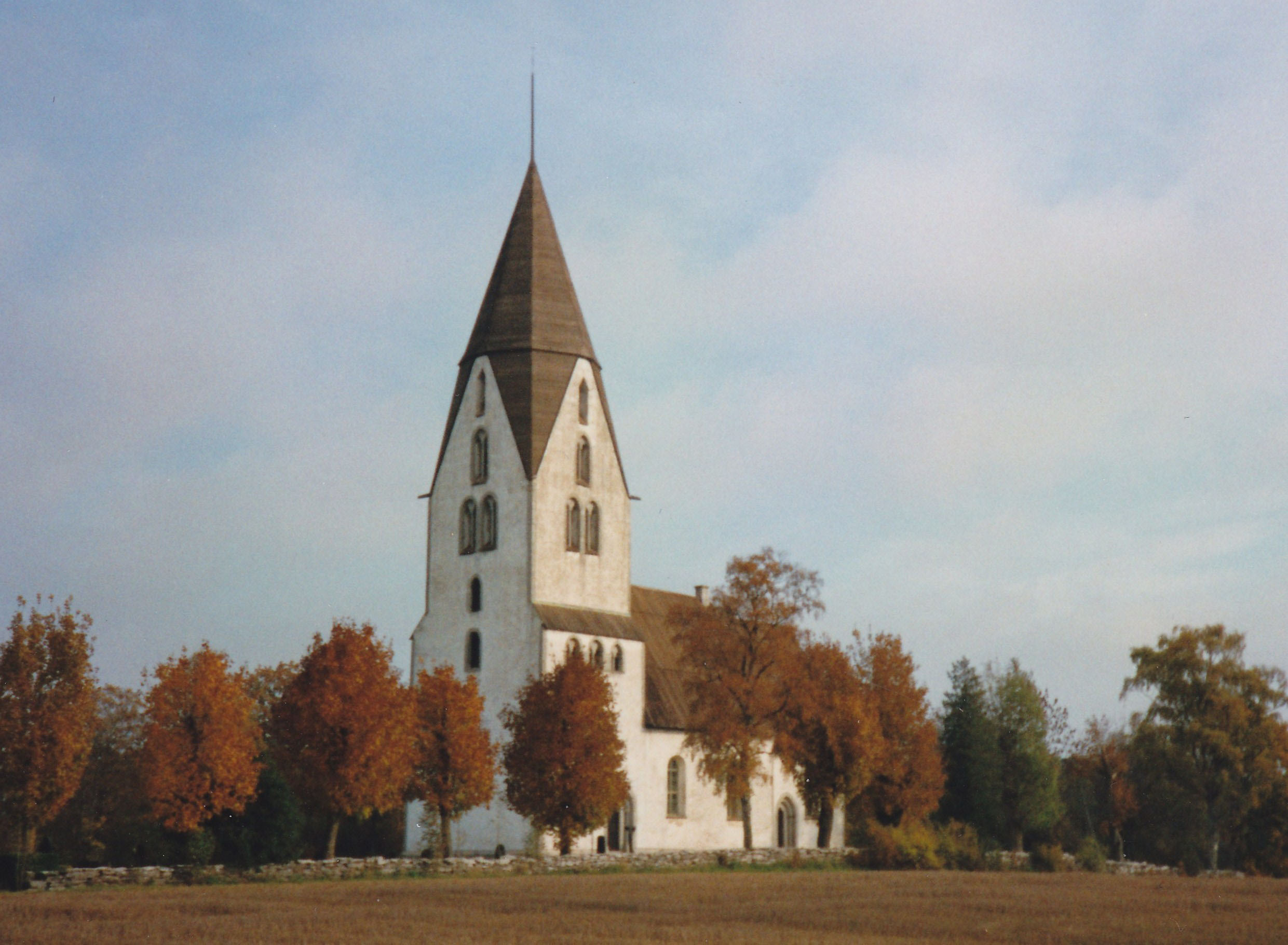
- Lojsta Church, view of the exterior

- Location on Gotland
- 57°18′46″N 18°23′02″E
- Country: Sweden
- Denomination: Church of Sweden

Administration
- Diocese: Visby

Lojsta Church (Swedish: Lojsta kyrka) is a medieval church in Lojsta on the Swedish island of Gotland. The well-preserved church contains several sets of medieval murals. It belongs to the Diocese of Visby within the Church of Sweden.

== History and architecture ==
The nave and choir form the oldest part of Lojsta Church. They date from the middle of the 13th century. During the first half of the 14th century, an earlier tower was replaced by the presently visible, clearly Gothic tower. In connection with this, some additional reconstruction works were carried out in the church.

The interior of the church is decorated by four distinct groups of medieval murals. The oldest, dating from the time of the construction of the nave and choir, are purely ornamental. On the wall between the choir and the nave, above the vault (itself dating from the "modernisation" of the church carried out in the 14th century) are murals from the 14th century depicting Christ as judge of the world, flanked by the apostles Saint Peter and Saint Paul, as well as the archangel Michael and Saint Margaret. On the northern wall of the nave is an additional set of wall paintings, dating from the middle of the 15th century and depicting the Passion of Christ and made by the so-called Master of the Passion of Christ. Finally, a fragmentary wall painting from 1520 depicting Saint George and the Dragon has been painted on the southern wall of the nave. The church is however more unusual for its well-preserved medieval stained glass windows. Only somewhat more than thirty churches still displays medieval stained glass in Sweden. In the three windows of the eastern choir wall of Lojsta Church however, all but a single pane are original, dating from the mid-13th century. They depict the story of the life, death and resurrection of Christ.

The church also contains some medieval furnishings. The baptismal font is from the 12th century but very worn. The altarpiece is from the 14th century, but was re-painted in the 19th century. In the choir floor lies a tombstone for a grave of a man (died 1342) and a woman (died 1344).

In the 1860s, the church windows were remade and replaced (save for the ones in the choir). The church was renovated in 1957.
