= Shoreline memorial =

Coordinates: 57°41′19″N 11°57′01″E

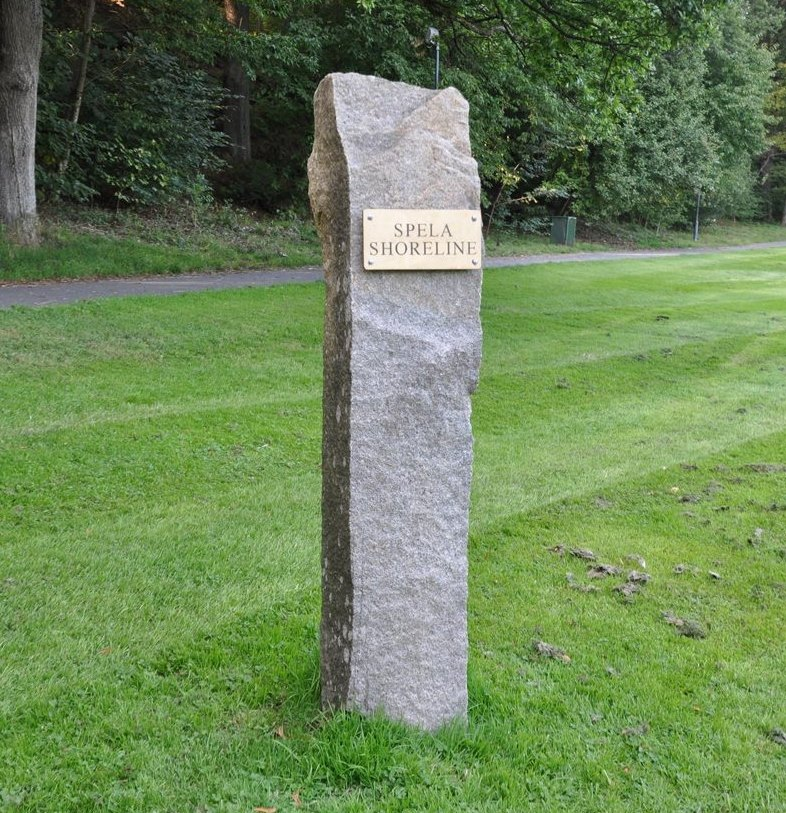
The memorial, in Slottsskogen.

The Shoreline memorial is a monument located in Slottsskogen, a large park in central Gothenburg, Sweden. The installation commemorates the location of the final reunion of the band Broder Daniel in 2008.

== History ==
Broder Daniel, a Gothenburg alternative rock group, was formed in 1989 by the two classmates Henrik Berggren and Daniel Gilbert. The band was inspired by among others The Jesus and Mary Chain, Iggy Pop, and The Velvet Underground, and relied heavily on distorted guitars and simple arrangements. Their lyrics mostly centred on existential issues and youth angst. After a few years of name changes, the band expanded its membership, and eventually put out their first album in 1995 (Saturday Night Engine, with EMI). They soon gained a relatively large following of fans throughout Sweden, and went on to release several more albums, EPs and singles. Broder Daniel has been largely regarded as a cornerstone of Swedish alternative music during the 1990s.

In 2001, the band first played the song "Shoreline" during a performance at the popular talk show Sen kväll med Luuk. At the time, the band's membership included Håkan Hellström, who left in 2003 to focus on his solo career.

After suffering from membership changes, illness and other issues, the band went on to release its most successful album in 2003, Cruel Town, which contained the track "Shoreline". That song, released as a single in 2004, has over the years become the band's most popular, and one of the most successful tracks in Swedish music history. In 2005, the singer Anna Ternheim released an EP titled Shoreline, containing a cover of the song. Since the band's eventual demise, calls to "play Shoreline" (Swedish: "spela Shoreline") have become common among some youth crowds, much in the vein of "Free Bird" by Lynyrd Skynyrd.

On 30 March 2008, the band's guitarist Anders Göthberg ended his life. The other band members were heavily affected by his death. A few months later, on 8 August, the band reunited for a final time to perform at the annual Way Out West Festival in the Slottsskogen park in Gothenburg, three years after their last performance together. "Shoreline" was played during the concert, which celebrated Göthberg's memory.

In August 2014, a monument dedicated the memory of Göthberg and Broder Daniel was put up on the site of the band's final concert. The memorial is a raised stone, weighing about 170–200 kg, carrying a plaque engraved with "Spela Shoreline". Soon afterwards, the city's Park and Nature Administration announced its intention to remove the memorial, citing it to be in violation of its rules. This was met with a robust response on social media from Broder Daniel fans and others, including a number of well-known Swedes, among them the artist, songwriter and music producer Ebbot Lundberg and the journalist, voice actor and television presenter Johan Lindqvist.

One of the most notable responses was a Facebook campaign launched by a member of the public on September 16, 2014 to make the municipality see how popular the monument in Gothenburg is, and compel them let it remain in situ. Over the first two days the campaign saw more than 5000 people support the cause. The campaign page is called Låt Shoreline-Stenen VARA KVAR (“Let the Shoreline-rock STAY!”) and can found on the Facebook page /SpelaShorelineGBG.
