= Broder Daniel =

Swedish alternative rock band

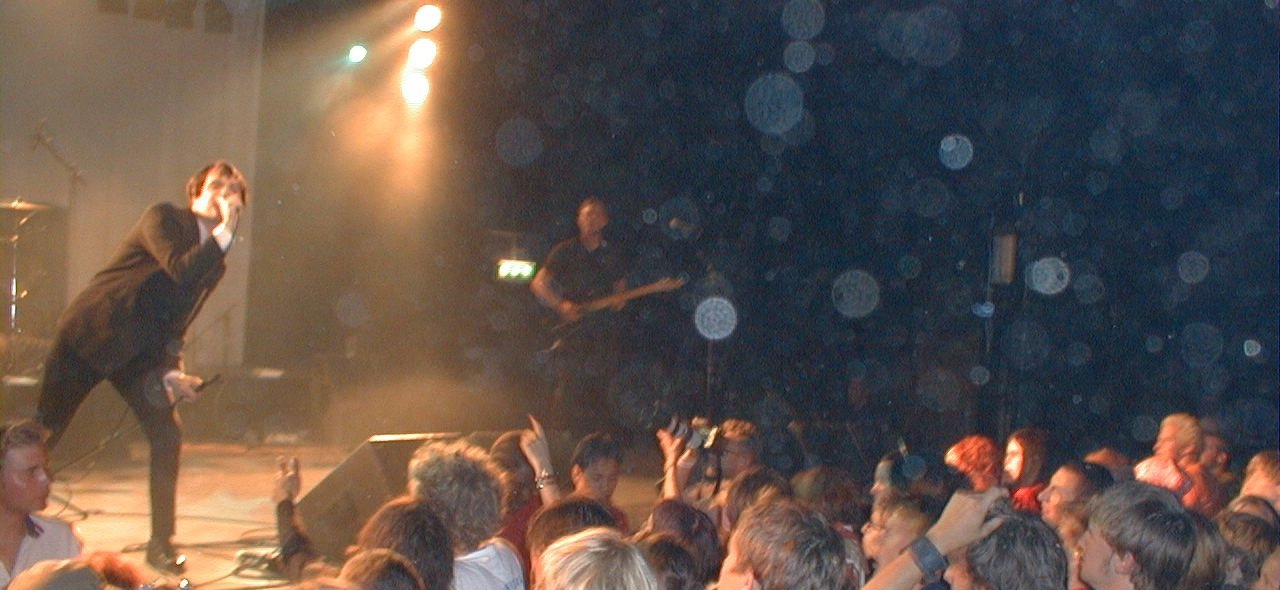
- Broder Daniel 1999

Background information
- Origin: Göteborg, Sweden
- Genres: Alternative rock Indie pop
- Years active: 1989–2008
- Label: Dolores Recordings
- Past members: Henrik Berggren; Theodor Jensen; Lars Malmros; Anders Göthberg; Håkan Hellström; Daniel Gilbert; Johan Neckvall
- Website: http://www.bede.se

Logo.

Broder Daniel (Swedish for Brother Daniel), often abbreviated as BD, was an alternative rock band from Gothenburg, Sweden. They formed in the late 1980s and then consisted of classmates Henrik Berggren and Daniel Gilbert. The band claims they started playing "to gain social respect" and it was decided early on that emotional expression would be more important to their sound than musical correctness.

Musically, they were inspired by bands such as The Jesus and Mary Chain and The Velvet Underground, relying heavily on distorted guitars and simple arrangements. Their lyrics have mostly centered on existential issues and youth angst.

Broder Daniel was largely regarded as a cornerstone of Swedish alternative music during the 1990s, even though the band has proven to be quite unstable ever since the beginning, with members leaving the band every few years. Their song "Shoreline" is considered a modern classic in Sweden, with the phrase "spela 'Shoreline'" ("play 'Shoreline'" in Swedish) commonly referenced in public. A monument to the band with a "Spela Shoreline" plaque existed in Gothenburg from 2014 to 2018.

The band broke up in 2008 following the suicide of guitarist Anders Göthberg, performing their final concert later that year at Gothenburg's Way Out West festival in his memory.

== History ==
While attending Göteborgs Högre Samskola in Gothenburg, Henrik Berggren sought a way to express himself and decided that the easiest path was to form a pop band. During the first six years of the band's existence, it went through several name changes before finally settling on Broder Daniel (Brother Daniel). New members joined, and the group gradually began to develop its sound. The Swedish music press soon picked up on the growing hype surrounding the now-notorious band, fronted by the charismatic Berggren, who quickly gained a cult following among maladjusted youth looking for a leader. Journalists, however, tended to focus mainly on the band's violent live shows, Berggren's make-up, and his out-of-tune voice.

The music label Jimmy Fun Music, owned by Roxette member Per Gessle, picked up the band and promoted them until they signed with EMI Music Sweden. In 1995, the band released their debut album, Saturday Night Engine, which was characterized by simple songs and a relatively low regard for musical correctness. They soon gained a sizeable following throughout Sweden.

After releasing their second album, the self-titled Broder Daniel, the band left EMI in 1997 and found themselves without a record deal—something few people in the music industry could understand. Although they did not sell many records, the band was a popular live act in clubs and at music festivals. One year later, they signed with Dolores Recordings and released their most critically acclaimed album to date, Broder Daniel Forever. The record had a darker tone, focusing on themes of love and death. Its sound was inspired by Psychocandy, the debut album by indie rock band The Jesus and Mary Chain. The popularity of Forever soon grew, and the band reached a larger audience than ever before, thanks in part to the inclusion of three Broder Daniel songs on the soundtrack for the film Show Me Love, one of the most popular Swedish films of the 1990s.

Following the release of Forever, the band embarked on a controversial tour across Sweden, which they later ended prematurely. They also played a few shows in England in an attempt to secure a record deal for international releases, but the effort was unsuccessful. After the tour, the members parted ways to recover and did not maintain contact with one another during the following year. In 2001, bassist Håkan Hellström released a successful solo album and soon afterward left the band, as the other members felt that his reputation as a spreader of joy did not suit Broder Daniel's image. Guitarist Theodor Jensen also released a celebrated album with his band The Plan.

Five years after the release of Forever, the band reunited to record their next album, Cruel Town, which was released in 2003. This time, they placed greater emphasis on the lyrics, which were more complex and less repetitive than before. The album presented a more mature Broder Daniel, with themes centered on society and nostalgia. Berggren now sang about the cold society that had shaped him, while also looking back on his childhood. Since the Cruel Town tour, the band has performed together only a few times. Singer Henrik Berggren has also performed several acoustic solo sets featuring Broder Daniel songs.

On 30 March 2008, guitarist Anders Göthberg committed suicide in Stockholm by jumping from the Västerbron bridge. The band performed together for the last time at the Way Out West Festival in Gothenburg in honour of Anders Göthberg. During the concert, they played their newly written song "Hold On to Your Dreams", dedicated to Göthberg.

In August 2014, a memorial to the band was raised at the site of their final concert in Slottsskogen.

== Members ==
- Henrik Berggren – singer
- Lars Malmros – drums
- Anders Göthberg – electric guitar (died in 2008)
- Theodor Jensen – bass guitar and electric guitar (left in 2003, rejoined in 2005)
- Daniel Gilbert – bass guitar (left in 1995)
- Johan Neckvall – electric guitar (left in 1997)
- Håkan Hellström – bass guitar and drums (played drums until his departure in 1994, rejoined as bass guitar player in 1998, left again in 2002)

== Discography ==
=== Albums ===
- Saturday Night Engine, 1995
- Broder Daniel, 1996
- Broder Daniel Forever, 1998
- Singles, 2000
- Cruel Town, 2003
- No Time For Us (1989–2004), 2005
- The Demos 1989-1997, 2005

=== Singles/maxisingles ===
- 1995 - Cadillac
- 1995 - Luke Skywalker
- 1995 - Iceage
- 1996 - Go my own way
- 1996 - Work
- 1998 - I'll be Gone
- 1998 - You bury me
- 1998 - Fucking Åmål theme: Underground
- 1998 - Fucking Åmål theme: Whirlwind
- 1999 - Happy People Never Fantasize
- 2003 - When We Were Winning
- 2003 - Cruel Town. Promo, snippet
- 2004 - Shoreline
- 2004 - What Clowns Are We
- 2005 - Luke Skywalker 7"

=== DVD ===
- 2004 - Army of Dreamers

=== Film ===
- 2009 - Broder Daniel Forever
