= Lojsta Lakes =

Lakes in the country of Sweden

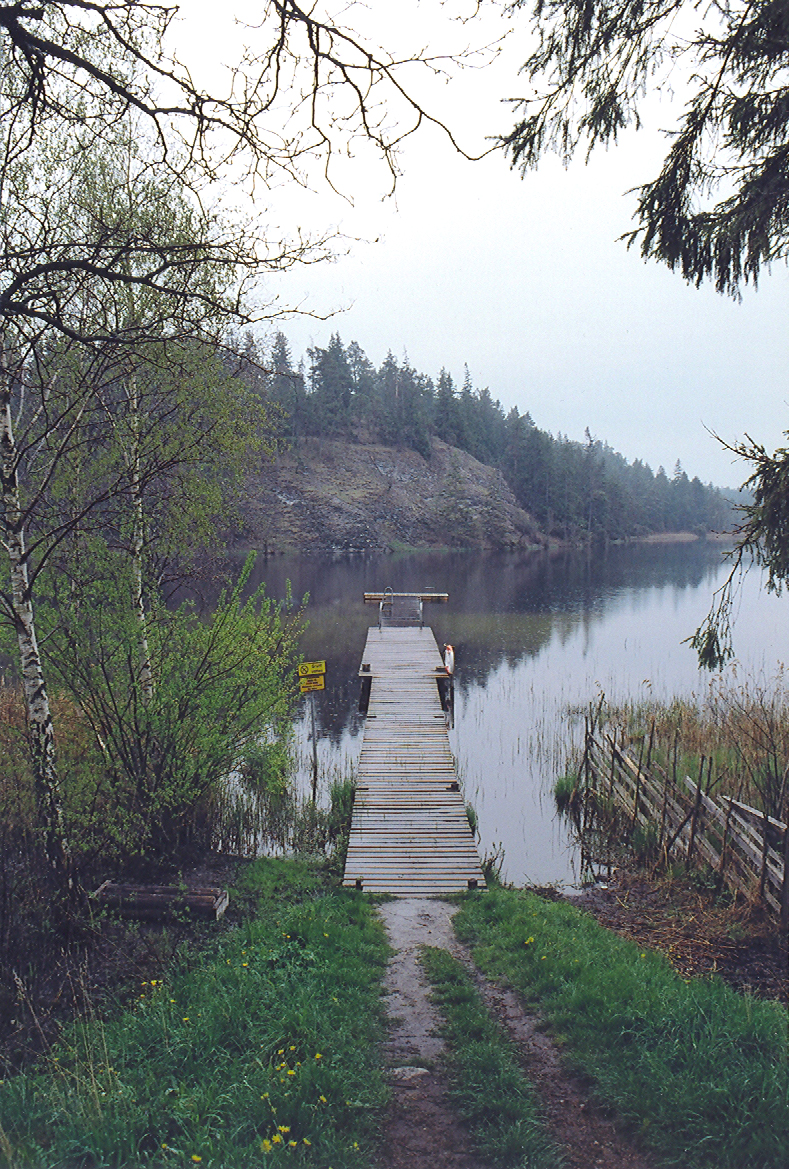
Lojsta Lakes, the pier in Broträsk

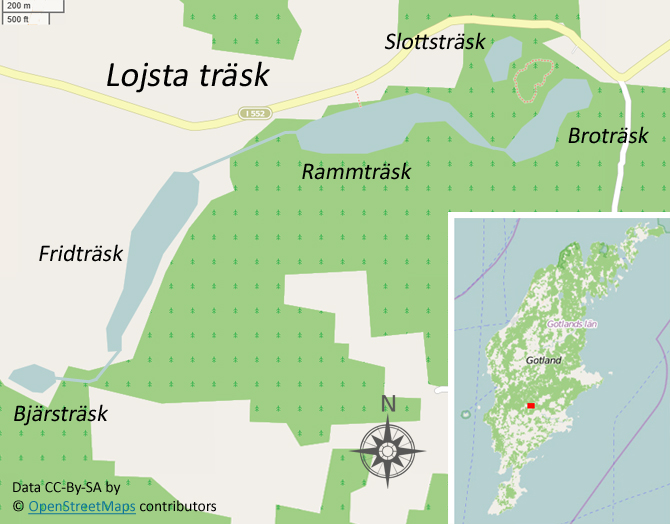
The five Lojsta Lakes

The Lojsta Lakes (Swedish: Lojstasjöarna) (sometimes referred to as the Lojsta Lake) (Gutnish: Lojsta träsk) are five lakes in Lojsta and Stånga sockens, Gotland, Sweden. The names of the lakes are (west to east) Bjärsträsk, Fridträsk, Rammträsk, Slottsträsk and Broträsk. Their outflow is in the Storkanalen at Kvarnåkershamn on southweetsern Gotland. Four of the lakes are connected by manmade canals. The Gutnish word for lake is träsk. The Slottsträsk, the "Castle Lake", (sometimes known as Lillträsk) got its name from the Lojsta Castle, a Medieval defence-structure, situated by the lake.

The lakes form a peculiar landscape, not found anywhere else on the island and reminiscent of the rift valleys of central Sweden with steep cliffs and deep lakes. The other lakes on Gotland are very shallow, bowl-shaped depressions in the bedrock, filled with water. For example, Lake Bästeträsk is no more than 5.5 m (18 ft) at its deepest and Lake Tingstäde no more than 3 m (9.8 ft). In relation to this the Lojsta Lakes are deep, more than 10 m (33 ft) with Rammträsk as the deepest at 15.4 m (51 ft), making it the second deepest lake on Gotland. The deepest lake is Sigvalde träsk at 15.8 m (52 ft). Lake Sigvalde is situated some kilometers east of the Lojsta Lakes, and is part of the same rift valley as them.

The area around the lakes contains an unusual amount of reef limestone. This limestone was originally imbedded in sedimentary limestone, but the latter was shaved off during the latest Ice age when the inland ice sheet moved, leaving high hills of reef limestone. Along the south side of the lakes is a layer of limestone which exceptionally rich in fossils. Most of the cliffs formed from reef limestone have a steep, sometimes vertical, side facing north. In these cliffs (Gutnish: klintar) are small caves, the largest of which can be found at Rammträsk and Broträsk.

There are large stands of white waterlilies in the lakes, a plant rarely seen in Gotlandic lakes. Among the fishes that can be found in the lakes are european perch, northern pike, common roach and ruffe. It is possible to rent canoes and paddle through the lake system, as well as purchase a fishing license for recreational fishing on the lakes. Fishing competitions are held on the lakes during the winter.

== The lakes ==
Geographical facts about the five Lojsta Lakes.

Name	Area	Elevation	Average depth	Maximum depth	Volume	Coordinates
Bjärsträsk	0.008 km^{2} (0.0031 mi^{2})	45 m (148 ft)	4.4 m (14 ft)	11.9 m (39 ft)	15,000 m^{3} (530,000 ft^{3})	57°18′43″N 18°23′25″E
Fridträsk	0.0883 km^{2} (0.0341 mi^{2})	45.1 m (148 ft)	1.9 m (6.2 ft)	3.3 m (11 ft)	379,000 m^{3} (13,400,000 ft^{3})	57°18′57″N 18°23′57″E
Rammträsk	0.095 km^{2} (0.037 mi^{2})	39.5 m (130 ft)	5.8 m (19 ft)	15.4 m (51 ft)	555,000 m^{3} (19,600,000 ft^{3})	57°19′9″N 18°24′23″E
Slottsträsk	0.101 km^{2} (0.039 mi^{2})	44.6 m (146 ft)	2.8 m (9.2 ft)	5.3 m (17 ft)	44,000 m^{3} (1,600,000 ft^{3})	57°19′17″N 18°25′7″E
Broträsk	0.032 km^{2} (0.012 mi^{2})	40 m (130 ft)	4.5 m (15 ft)	9.5 m (31 ft)	145,000 m^{3} (5,100,000 ft^{3})	57°19′7″N 18°25′8″E
