= Lojsta Castle =

Ruined castle in Sweden

Coordinates: 57°19′14″N 18°25′10″E

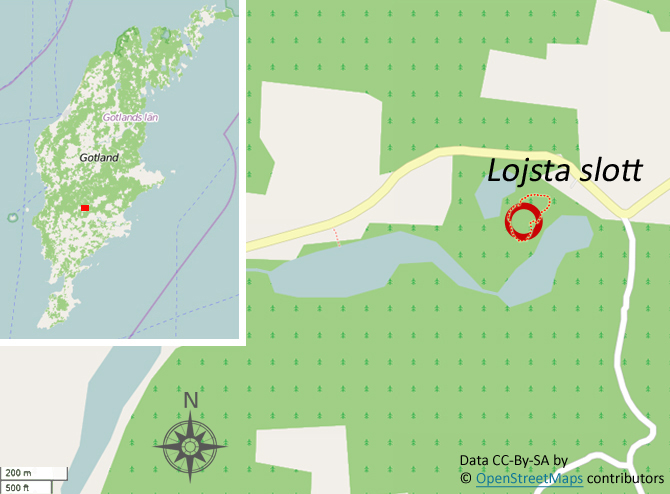
Location of Lojsta Castle (Lojsta slott)

Lojsta Castle (Lojsta slott) in Stånga socken on the border of Lojsta, Gotland, Sweden, is, despite its name, not a "castle" in the normal sense, i.e. it is not a palacelike manor. It is the ruins of a once fortified estate, consisting of houses surrounded by a wall and a moat.

In the Middle Ages, Lojsta Castle was a defence-structure, placed on an island in one of the small Lojsta Lakes in the middle of Gotland. The fortress is believed to have been used by the Vitalians who supported the captured Swedish king at the time, Albert of Mecklenburg. The Vitalians were pirates and they used Gotland as their base. In 1404, they were defeated by the Teutonic Knights and forced to relinquish Lojsta Castle and the other two strongholds they had on Gotland.

Today there is not much remaining of the stronghold. In the beginning of the 20th century, archaeologists surveyed the area but the theories they proposed are questioned today, for example, observations about three house foundations in the fortress. The buildings were most likely made out of wood, about 20 to 30 by 10 m (66 to 98 by 33 ft), and today there are no traces of them above ground.

The fortress was surrounded by a dug moat, 100 m (330 ft) long, 3 to 10 m (9.8 to 32.8 ft) wide and up to 1.7 m (5.6 ft) high, that together with an embankment and a palisade separated the fortress' inner courtyard from the outer. Today, the lake's surface level is estimated at 2.5 m (8.2 ft) lower than it was during the Middle Ages and it is divided into three smaller lakes. The remains of the fortress is situated between the Slottsträsk and the Broträsk lakes. When the fortress was in use, it had a drawbridge to the mainland, of which you can still see remains. Nowadays the ruins of the fortress can be reached by land.

== Lojsta Hall ==
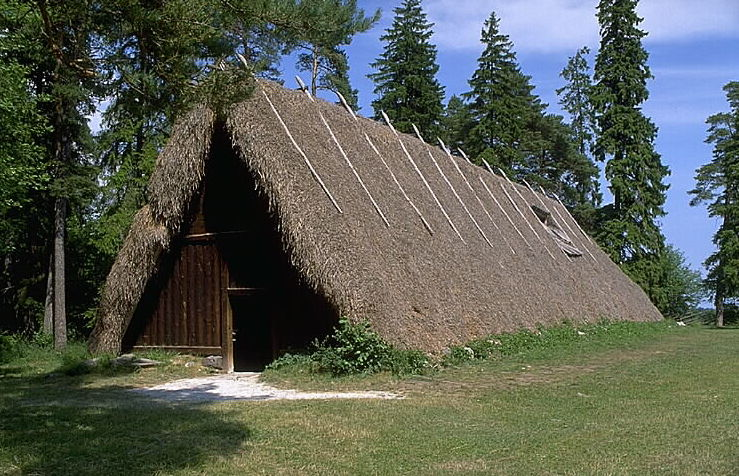
Lojsta Hall

About 150 m (490 ft) northeast of the Lojsta Castle, is the Lojsta Hall, a reconstructed Iron Age building. It is built on the remaining foundation of an 30 by 16 m (98 by 52 ft) Iron Age house. The site was excavated in 1929 by John Nihlén. The archeological finds were few and not very remarkable, but they suggests that the house had been inhabited during the Migration Period. Inside the remains of the foundation, parts of two log boats were found.

In 1932, a reconstruction of the building was erected, showing how the building might have looked during the Iron Age. The people and their animals probably lived together in the hall. The inhabitants raised livestock, but trade was also an important part of their livelihood. The roof of the hall is covered with saw-sedge, a common plant on the Gotlandic mires.
