= Slottsskogen =

Park in Gothenburg, Sweden

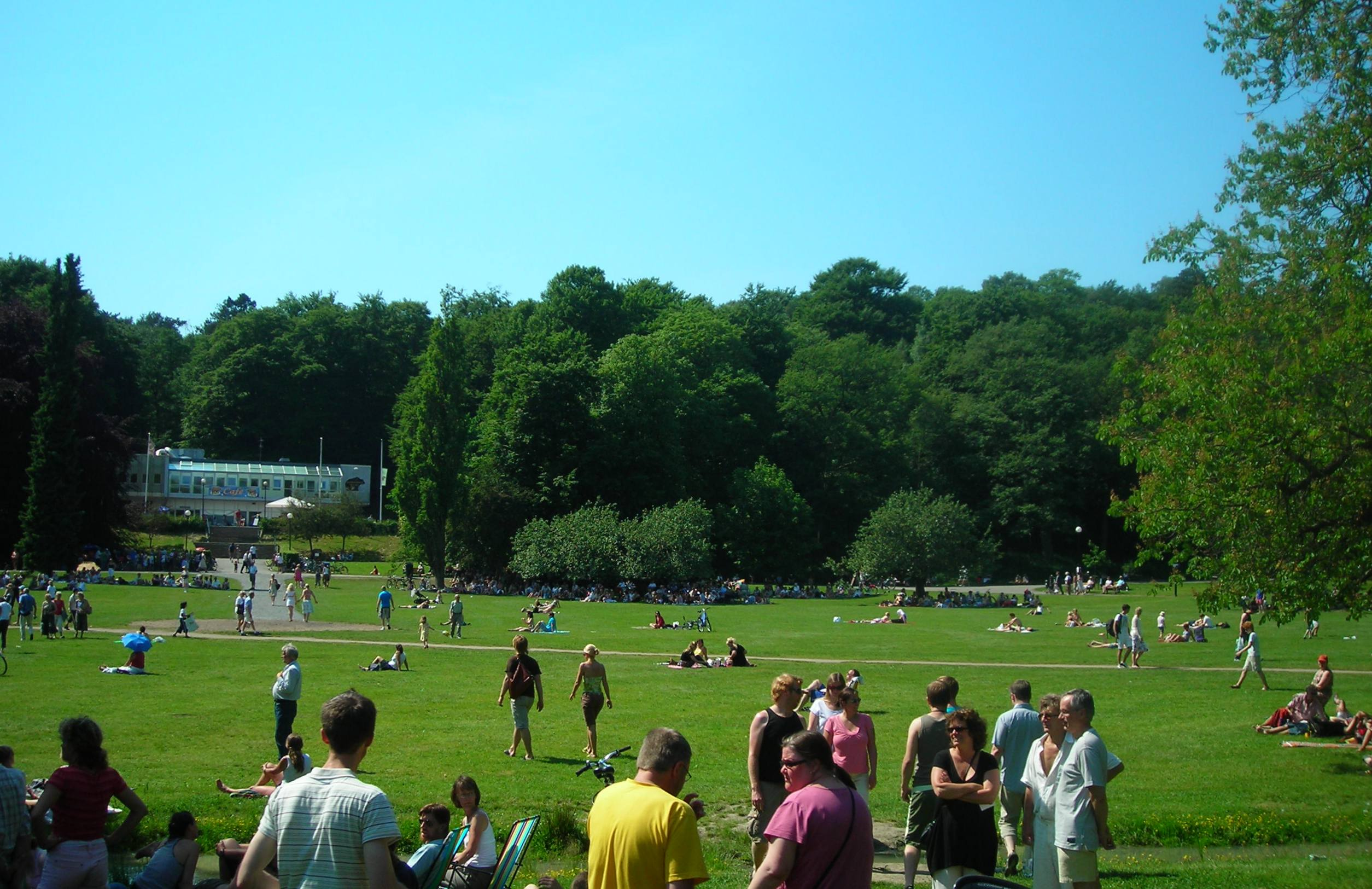
- One of the lawns of Slottsskogen park
- Interactive map of Slottsskogen
- Location: Gothenburg, Sweden
- Coordinates: 57°41′10″N 11°56′20″E
- Area: 140 hectare
- Created: 1876

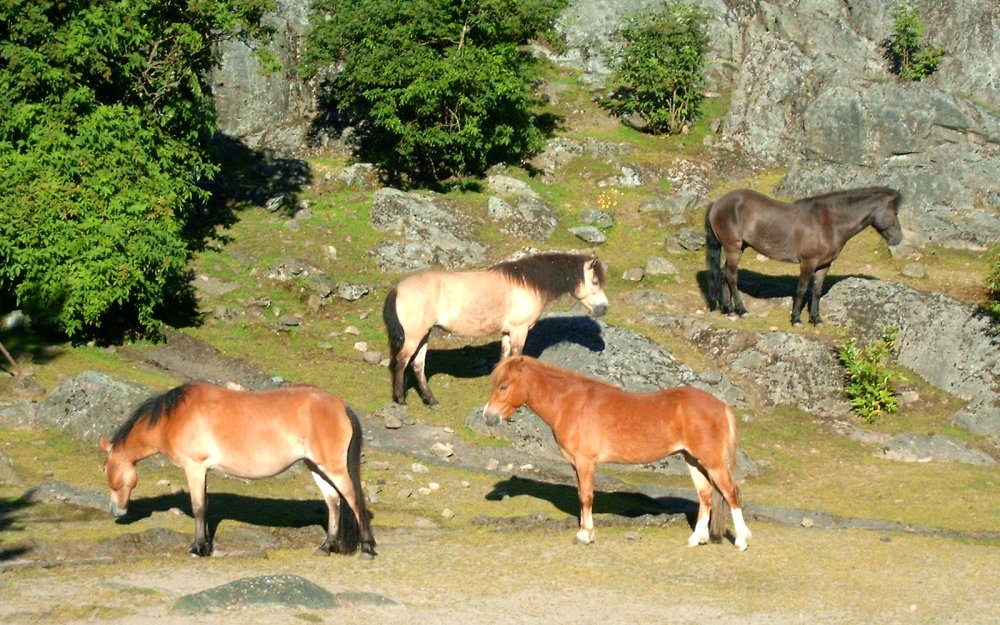
Gotland ponies in the Slottsskogen zoo

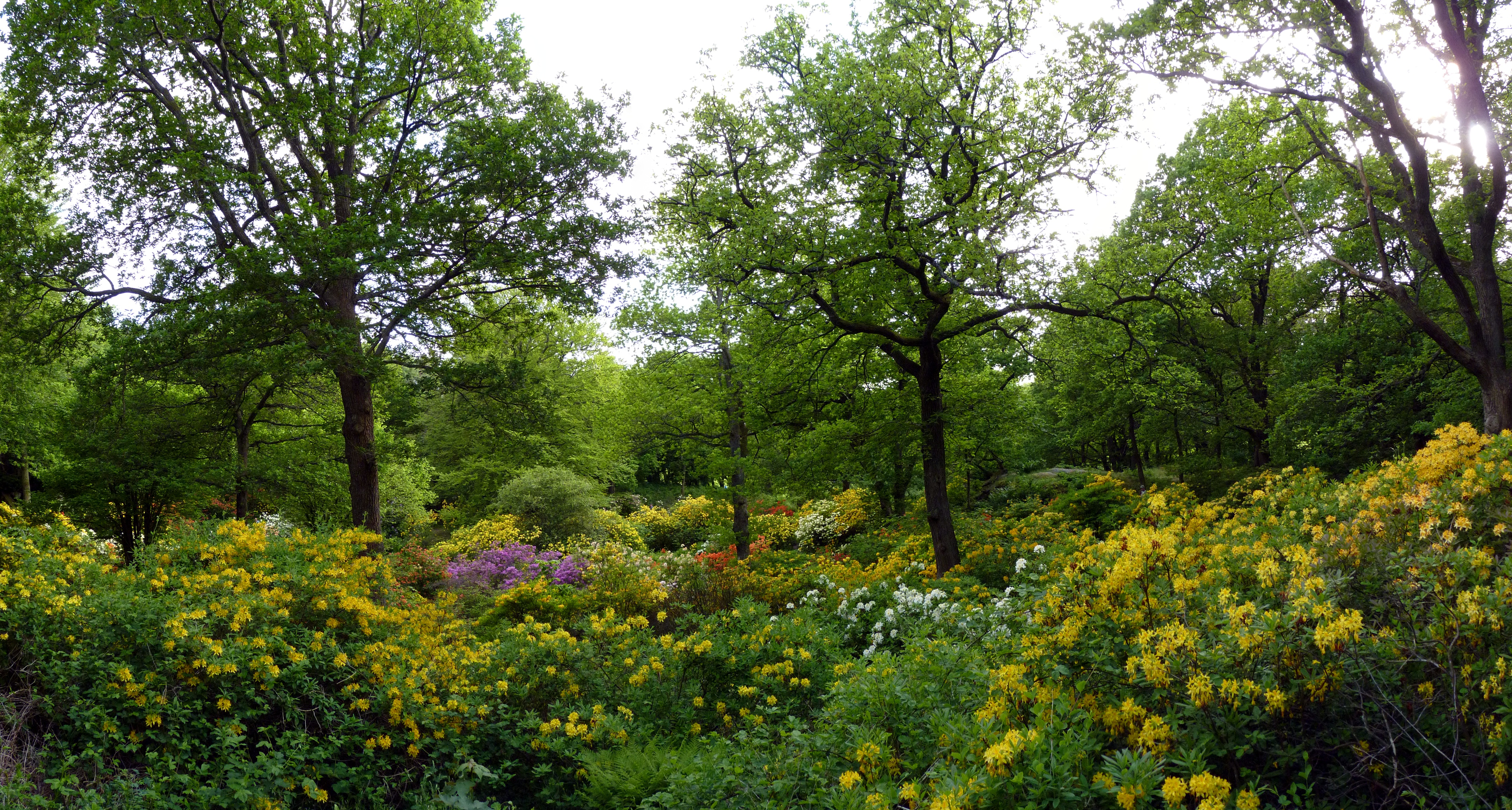
The Azalea valley during blossom

Slottsskogen (Swedish: [ˈslɔ̂tːˌskuːɡɛn], lit. 'The Castle Forest') is a 137-hectare park located in central Gothenburg, Sweden.

== History ==
When Gothenburg was founded in the 17th century, the area of Slottsskogen was a forest that belonged to the Old Älvsborg fortress. In the 1880s the city had grown to the vicinity of the forest, and merchant August Kobb took initiative to create the city park, which has the character of an English garden with lawns and trees.

== Activities ==
Slottsskogen has a wide range of activities: there is Slottsskogens djurpark, a zoo with Swedish animals, a pond with seals and penguins, a Swedish heritage area with small cottages from different counties, a playground for football, softball, frisbee golf and so forth. Slottsskogen is also the home of the Way Out West Festival, which occurs annually. In August 2014, a memorial to the last concert of the band Broder Daniel during Way Out West 2008 was raised in Slottsskogen.
