= Gotland Russ =

Swedish breed of horse

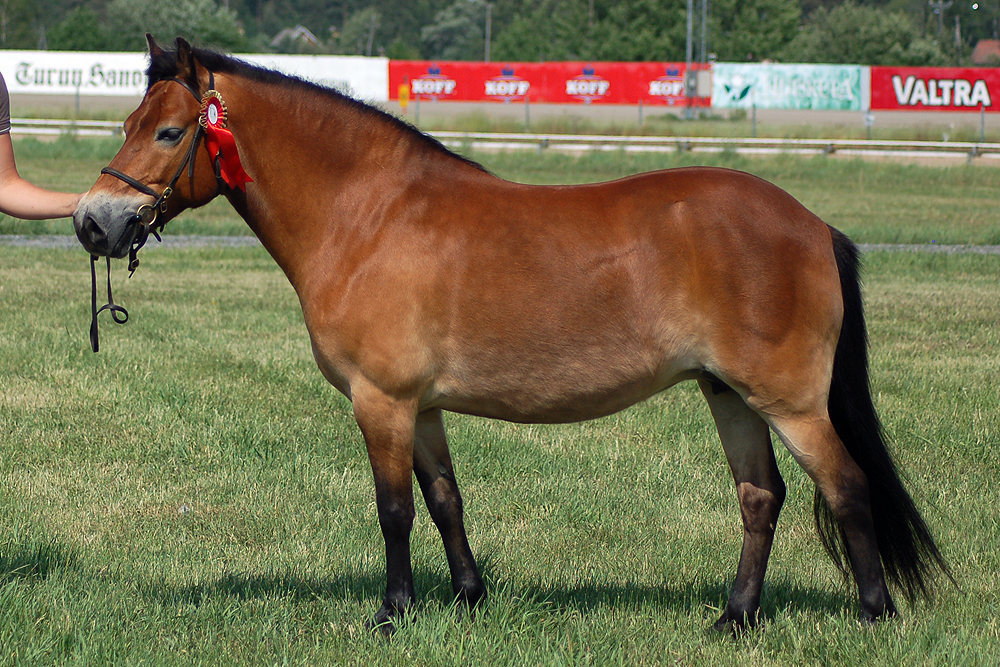

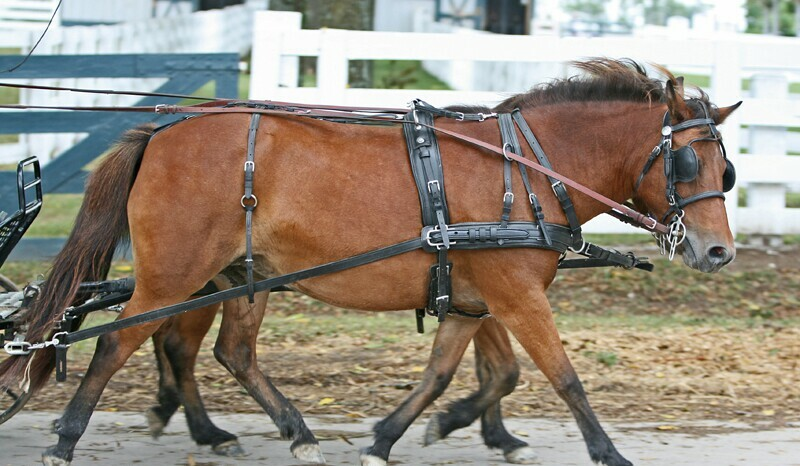
- Conservation status: FAO (2007): endangered; DAD-IS (2022): endangered/at risk
- Other names: Gotland Pony; Gotlandruss; Russ; Skogsbagge; Skogshäst; Skogsruss
- Country of origin: Sweden
- Distribution: European countries, USA
- Use: driving, riding

Traits
- Weight: 250 kg (550 lbs)
- Height: 117–132 cm (11.2-13.0 hands)
- Colour: bay, dun, chestnut, black

Breed standards
- Svenska Russavelsföreningen

The Gotland Russ or Gotland Pony is an old Swedish breed of pony or small horse. Until the twentieth century it was found only on the island of Gotland on the south-eastern coast of Sweden. It is now distributed through much of Sweden and is also present in some other European countries and in the United States. The Öland horse from the neighbouring island of Öland was a close relative of the Gotland, but became extinct in the early twentieth century.

== Characteristics ==
The Gotland Russ is rustic, hardy, frugal and energetic. It is somewhat similar in appearance to the Hucul, the Konik and the Exmoor Pony. It weighs approximately 250 kg, and usually stands between 117 cm and 132 cm at the withers.

The coat is most commonly dun, bay, chestnut or black. Blue-eyed cream, piebald and grey animals may not be registered. The spotted coat was formerly seen in the breed, but is now extinct.

== Breed history ==
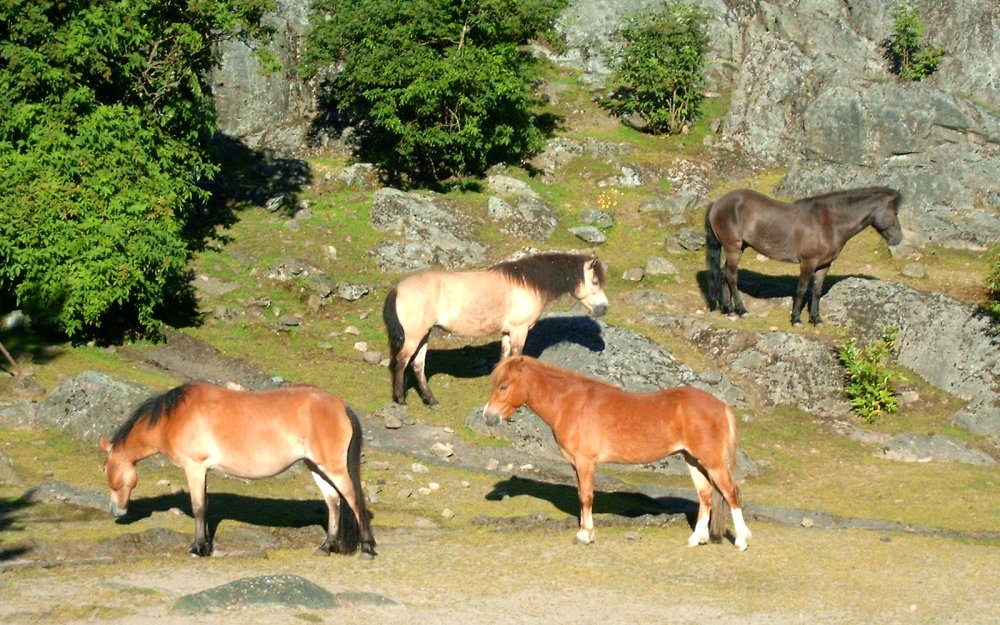
Gotland ponies in Slottsskogen, Gothenburg

The name russ comes from a now obsolete word ross, which means a riding horse or a charger and it is linked etymologically to the English word horse (in Old High German this word appeared as hros, and in English a metathesis has switched the places of the /r/ and the /o/, whereas in Swedish /hr/ became /r/, producing ross or russ.

The presence of feral horses on the Baltic island of Gotland is documented from the thirteenth century. From the mid-nineteenth century settlers moved to the island, much land was cleared for farming, and numbers of the Russ fell sharply. In 1880 a breeding centre was established, where two stallions of Oriental type were used; other stud farms were opened in the early twentieth century. Nevertheless, by 1922 there were no more than fourteen of the horses remaining – a two-year-old stallion, seven mares and six young horses.

The first volume of the Stambok för russ, the stud-book for the Russ, was published in Sweden in 1943. In the 1950s fresh blood was introduced by the use of two imported Welsh stallions, Reber General 106 and Criban Daniel 142; their influence is widespread in the population, but at a low percentage. The stud-book was definitively closed to outside blood in 1971. A breed society, the Svenska Russavelsföreningen, was established in Visby in 1967.

The Russ is distributed through much of Sweden and is also present in the other Scandinavian countries and in the United States.

== Uses ==
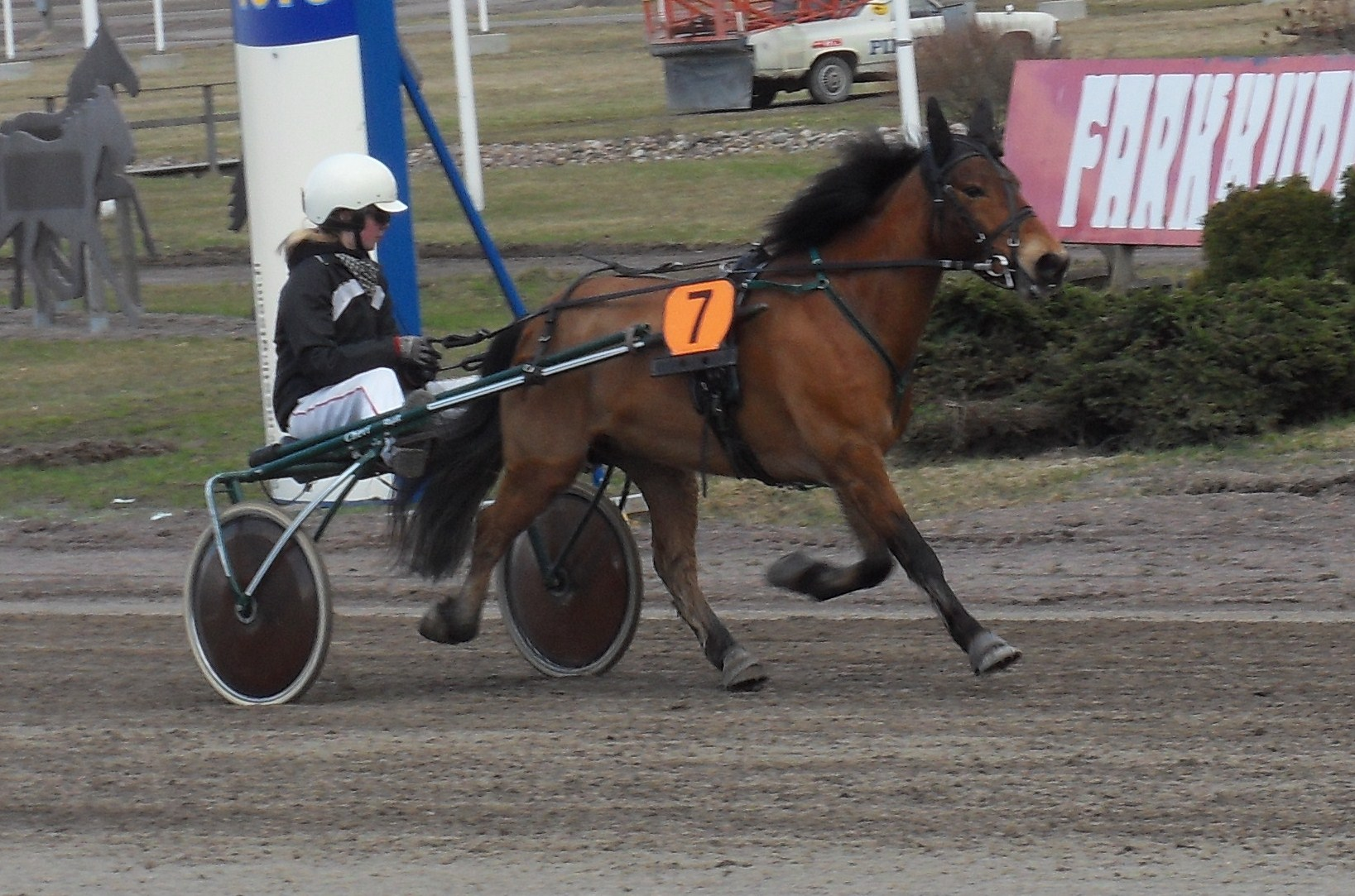
A harness racing Gotland pony

The Gotland Russ is a good all-round pony and is often used as a riding pony for children or as a harness racing pony.
