= Heck horse =

Horse breed

Heck Horse
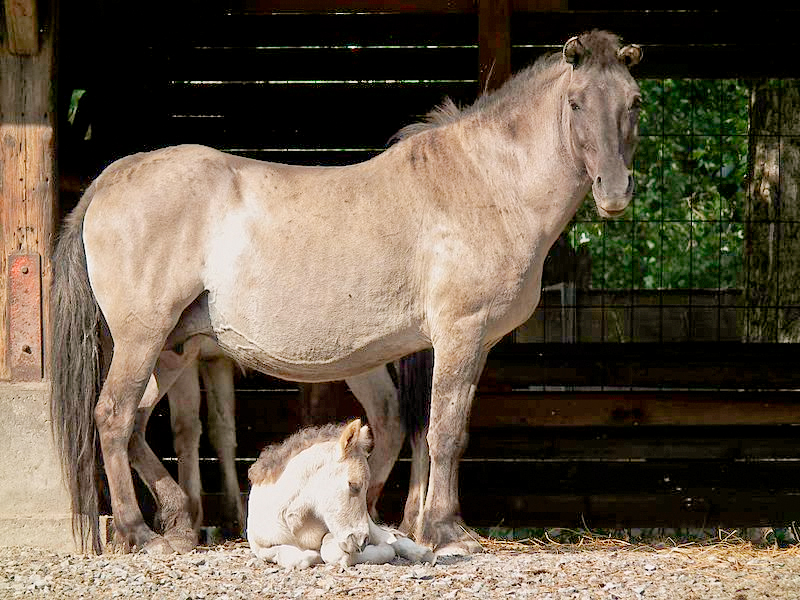

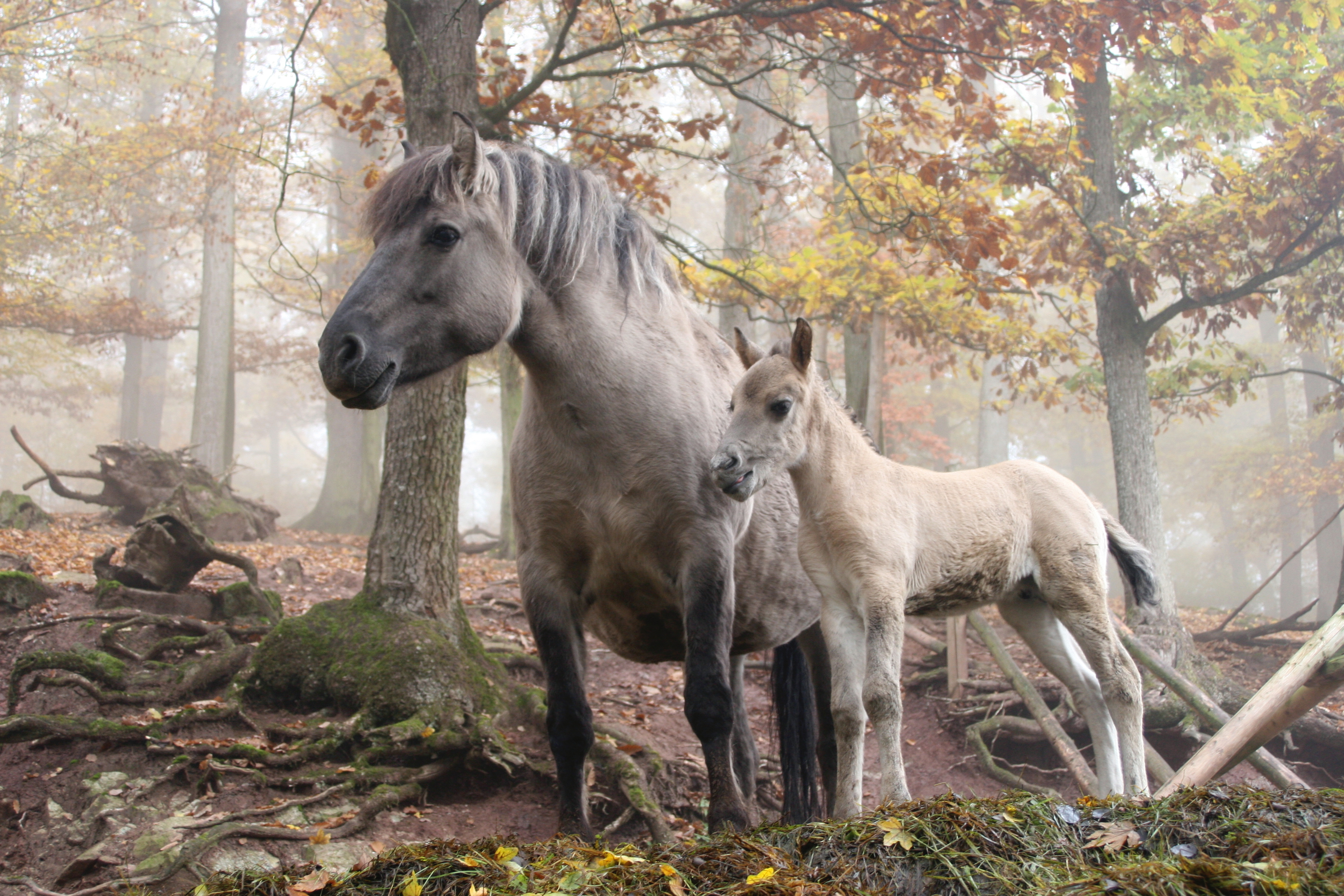
- Country of origin: Germany

Traits
- Distinguishing features: Intended to resemble the extinct Tarpan

The Heck horse is a horse breed that is claimed to resemble the tarpan (Equus ferus ferus), an extinct wild equine. The breed was created by the German zoologist brothers Heinz Heck and Lutz Heck in an attempt to breed back the tarpan. Although unsuccessful at creating a genetic copy of the extinct species, they developed a look-alike breed with grullo coloration and primitive markings. Heck horses were subsequently exported to the United States, where a breed association was created in the 1960s.

== Breed characteristics ==
Heck horses are dun or grullo (a dun variant) in color, with occasional white markings. The breed has primitive markings, including a dorsal stripe and horizontal striping on the legs. However, they lack the erect manes of primitive equines including tarpans. Heck horses generally stand between 12.2 and 13.2 hands (50 and 54 inches, 127 and 137 cm) tall. The head is large, the withers low, and the legs and hindquarters strong. The hooves are strong, often not needing shoeing. The gait of the Heck horse is high stepping, which makes them comfortable to ride and which is considered attractive while being driven. The breed is described as being calm, friendly, curious and intelligent, although very independent. The physical description of tarpans was very similar – strong, approximately the same height, and with the same coloration and primitive markings.

== History ==
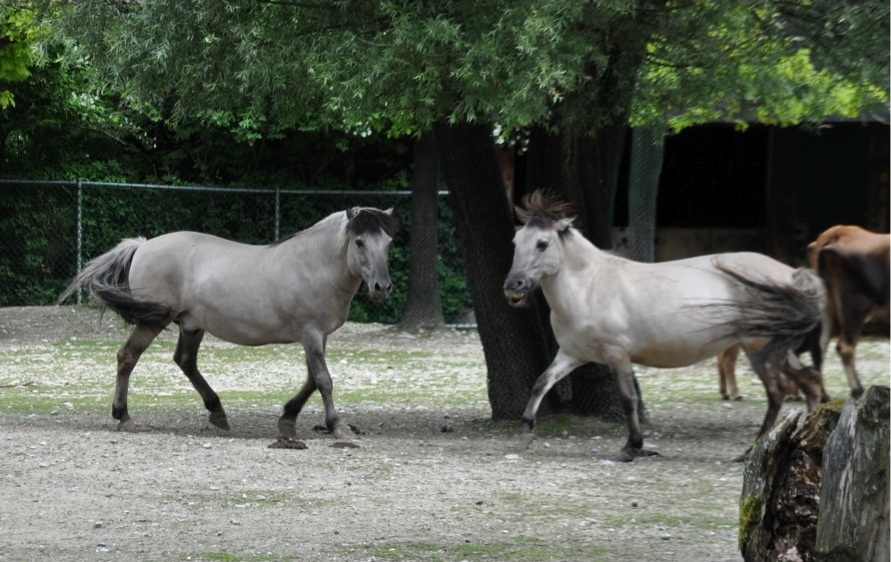
Heck horses at the Hellabrunn Zoo with less influence from the Konik

The tarpan was a Eurasian wild horse that became extinct in the wild in 1879, due to hunting and crossbreeding with domesticated horses, and in 1909 the last captive horse died in Russia. The Heck horse was created by the German zoologist brothers Heinz Heck and Lutz Heck, director of the Berlin Zoo, at the Tierpark Hellabrunn (Munich Zoo) in Germany in their attempt to breed back the tarpan. The Hecks believed they could recreate the extinct tarpan subspecies by back breeding living descendants. They believed they could combine and rearrange the genetic material from these living descendants into a recreation of the extinct horse. Other breeders had the same idea, and used different genetic stock to attempt to recreate the tarpan or a reasonable look-alike. One result was a line of horses bred from American Mustangs by breeder Harry Hegardt.

The Heck brothers bred together several European small horse and pony breeds hypothesized to be descended from the tarpan. They eventually integrated mares of the Konik, Icelandic horse, and Gotland breeds. These mares were bred to stallions of a wild horse type known as Przewalski's horse. The Hecks believed the wild Przewalski blood would help to draw out the wild characteristics they felt lay dormant in the domesticated pony breed mares. The initial crosses were made between Gotland and Icelandic mares (who visually closely resembled the tarpan, especially in the shape of the head) and Przewalski's horse stallions (who provided the desired dun coloration and upright mane), and the offspring were then bred to each other. The first foal born from the program who had the desired coloration was a colt born on May 22, 1933, at the Tierpark Hellabrunn. The breeding program continued, using only those horses showing the desired skull shape, bone structure and coloration. Relatively quickly, the breed's conformation and coloration became set, with parents reliably passing their characteristics to their offspring.

During World War II, horses of the desired type were taken from German-occupied countries to use in the Hecks' breeding program. Tadeusz Vetulani, a Polish biologist, had been working with Konik horses, at that point believed to be descended from tarpans, with the goal (like the Hecks) of recreating the tarpan. Some of the horses from his program had been reintroduced to the forests of Białowieża, Poland. During the war, the Hecks removed the animals from the forest and used them in their own breeding programs. Vetulani considered this a "baffling campaign of destruction", and the Hecks' actions effectively ended his breeding program. Some of the resulting Heck horses were sent back to Białowieża, to become part of a hunting preserve for Nazi government officials. The land, and the horses, were returned to Polish management after the war ended. As of 2007, a small herd of the horses remained, living with little interference from humans, in Białowieża Forest, Europe's last remaining area of primeval lowland forest. The Hecks had conducted a similar breeding program in hopes of recreating the aurochs, resulting in what would become Heck cattle.

=== Export and crossbreeding ===
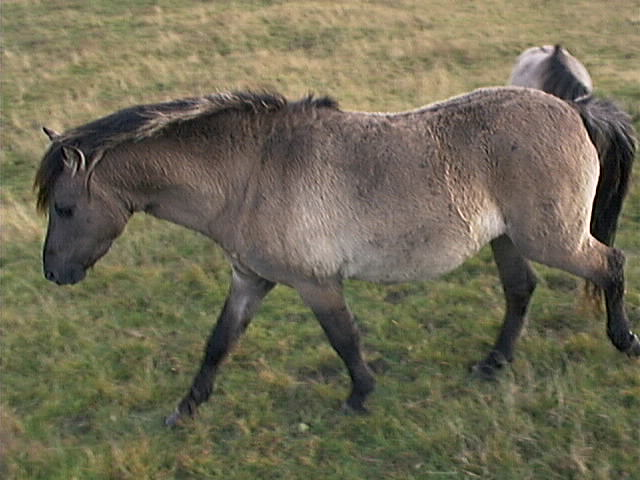
Heck horse in Haselünne, Germany (2004)

The first Heck horse in the United States was a stallion named Duke, imported in 1954 by the Chicago Zoological Park in Illinois, followed by two mares in 1955. A third mare was imported by the Fort Worth Zoological Park in Texas in 1962. All four horses came from the Munich Zoo and in the early 1990s, all Heck horses in the United States traced back to these animals. Several private breeders in the United States now use these horses for riding and light driving. In the early 1960s, the North American Tarpan Association was founded by Heck horse enthusiasts to promote the breed. In 2002, there were fewer than 100 Heck horses in the United States, most of them having descended from the six foundation horses, all imported from Germany. As of 2013, a small number of Heck horses lived in a feral state in Latvia.

Several breeders have crossed the Heck horse with other breeds to get a larger horse with some of the primitive characteristics. Breeds commonly crossed with the Heck horse are the Welsh pony and Arabian horse, and a new breed of pony, called the Canadian Rustic Pony, has been developed from these three breeds. In Europe, many breeders cross Heck horses with Thoroughbreds to produce hunters.

== See also ==
- Heck cattle
- Breeding back
- List of German horse breeds
