= Lille Vildmose =

Protected area in Denmark

- IUCN category II (national park)
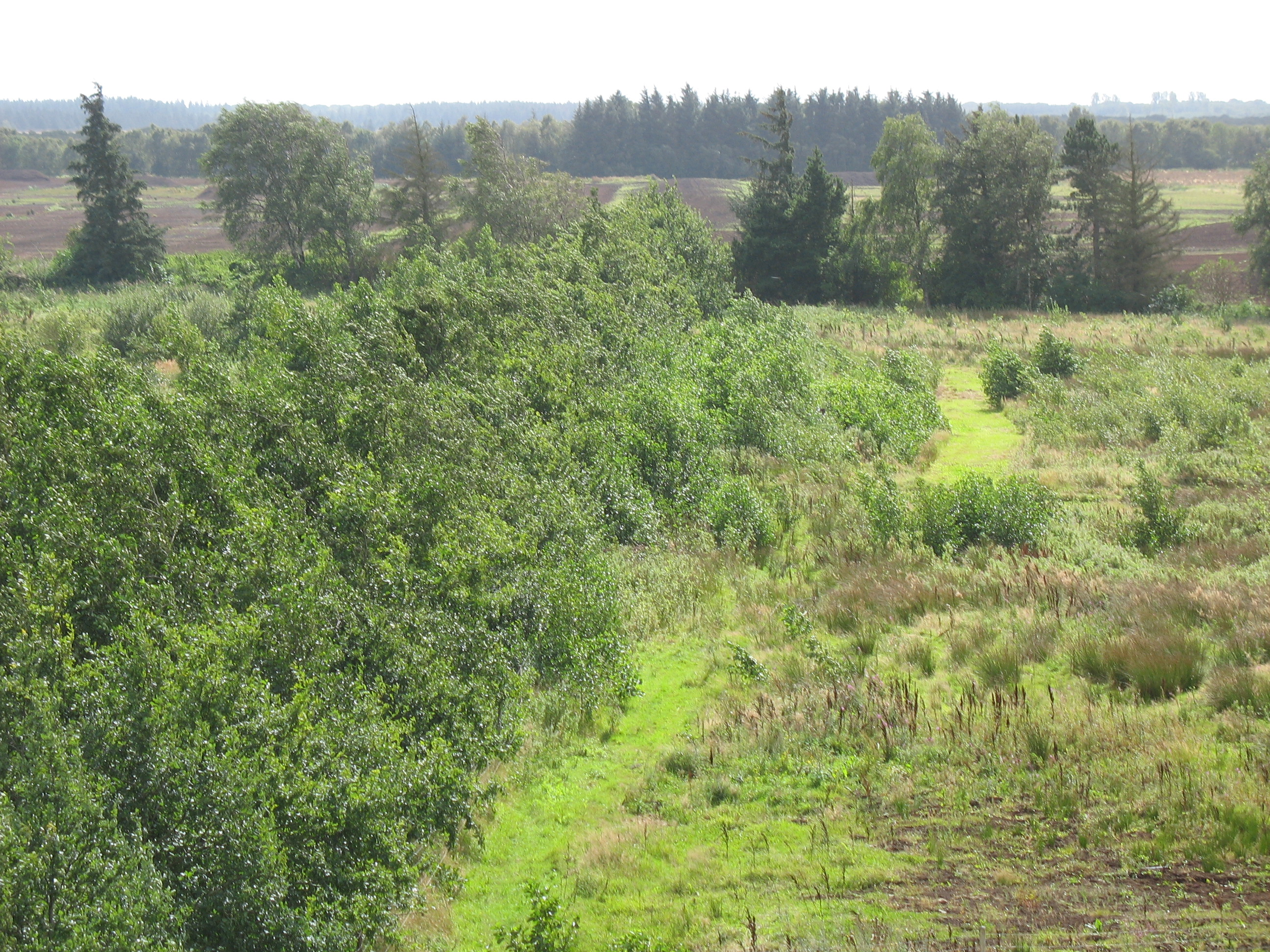
- View of the central part of Lille Vildmose

- Location within Denmark
- Location: Denmark
- Nearest city: Aalborg
- Coordinates: 56°53′15″N 10°13′14″E
- Area: 7,600 hectares (19,000 acres)

Ramsar Wetland
- Designated: 18 May 2013
- Reference no.: 2166

Lille Vildmose (meaning: “little wild bog”) is a raised bog in the hinterland in the municipalities of Aalborg and Mariagerfjord, Denmark. It is the largest remaining raised bog in Northwestern Europe. The bog is a remnant of heathland that once extended south from Limfjorden to Rold Forest.

== Geography ==
Lille Vildmose is a protected area, about 28 miles (45 km) southeast of Aalborg. It encompasses an area of 7,600 hectares (19,000 acres) which is owned both privately and partly by the State. A well-preserved, pristine wilderness, it contains the largest remaining raised bog in Northwestern Europe. Its habitat consists of raised bogs (once part of the seabed), former islands (during the Stone Age), and a large area of coastal hills and beach meadows.

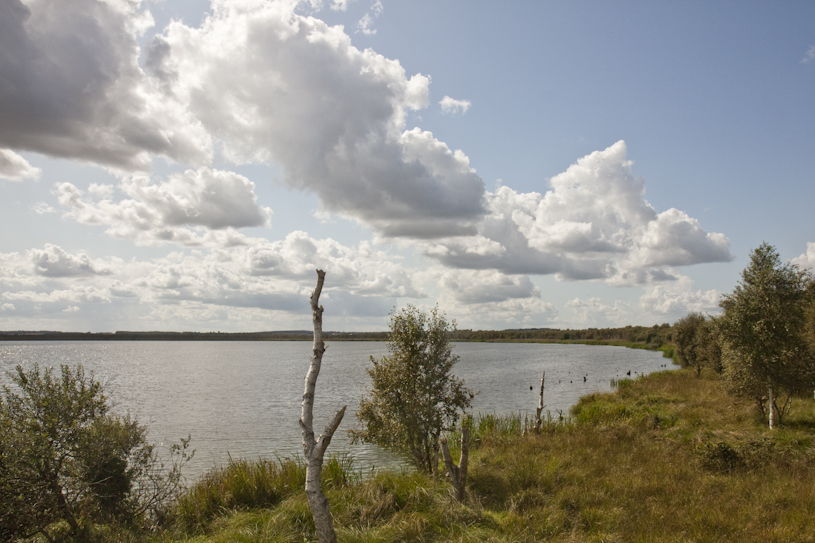
Tofte Lake

The raised bogs flourished undisturbed for 1,200 years till they were intentionally drained around 1750. They contain layers of peat growing at an annual rate of 4–5 millimetres (0.16–0.20 in) and reaching a depth of 5 metres (16 ft). Rainwater provides the nutrients. Tofte Lake (Tofte sø) has been formed after draining the marsh over a period of 200 years. The deciduous forests of Høstemark, Tofte, and Mose are part of the protected area secured by fencing. Trees have started to grow on the Portlandmose and Paraplymose, both raised bogs, as a result of drainage.

== History ==
Rye was cultivated in Lille Vildmose prior to the medieval period when hemp was introduced for diversification, after ca. 1140. Agricultural production dropped and farmland in Lille Vildmose was abandoned between 1360 and 1540 due to the Black Death plague, resulting in the regeneration of woodland. After 1540, farming was intensified, the main products being rye and hemp. By 1760, when Lille Vildmose belonged to the Lindenborg Estate, more than 5,000 ha (12,000 acres) were tilled for the estate's farm, Vildmosegård. In the early 19th century, the reclamation of Lille Vildmose was the impetus needed to establish a peat industry. The peatcutting have now been terminated completely for many reasons of which the conservation efforts is just one.

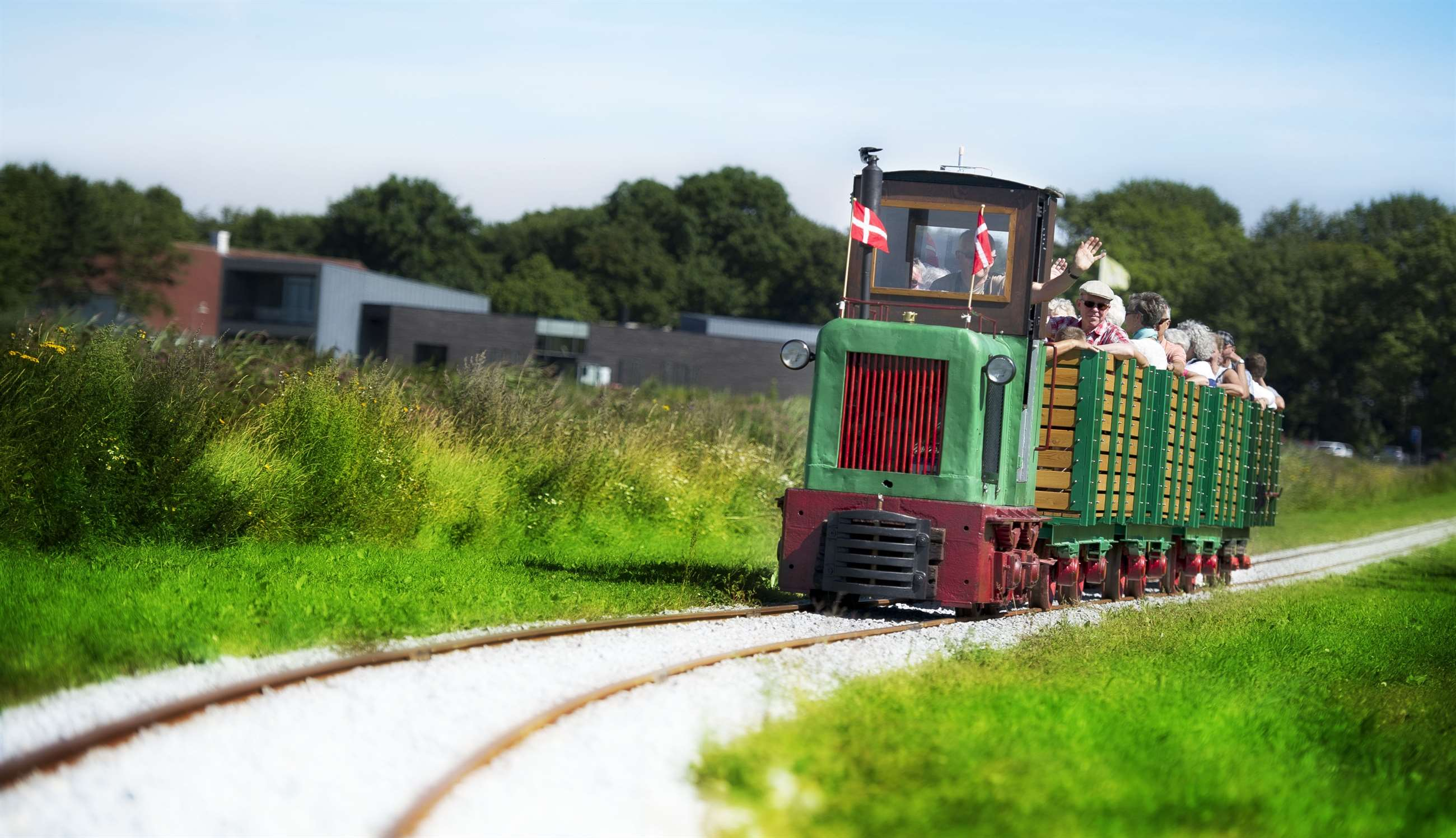
The Peat-train at Lille Vildmose

In 2003, together with Mols Bjerge and Møn, Lille Vildmose was selected by the Ministry of the Environment to participate in a pilot project to develop a model for Danish national parks.

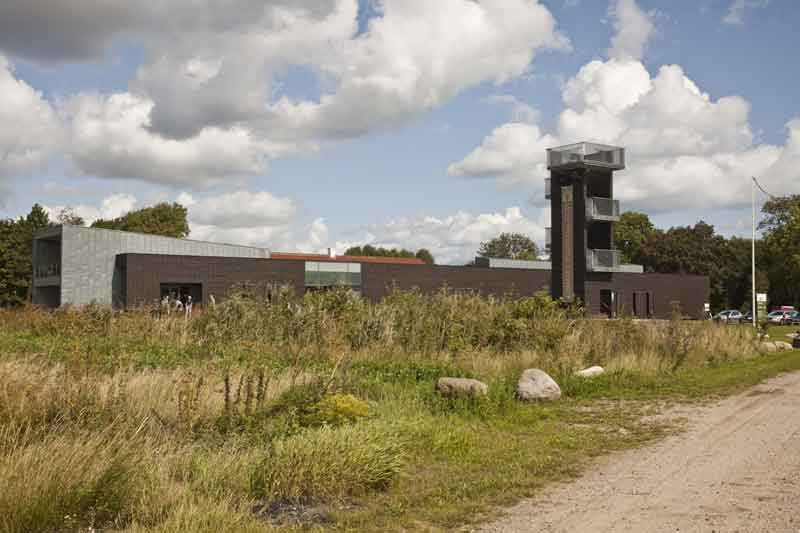
Lille Vildmosecentret

The visitor center, Lille Vildmosecentret, was designed by C. F. Møller Architects and opened in 2006. It contains an activity center and is also the starting point for visiting the bogs and forests. Wildlife can be observed from the park's look-out tower. An eagle simulator, landscape models, interactive exhibits, recreation areas for children, and hiking paths are other features. Double-decker bus service began in 2009 from Hobro in the south to Egense near Hals in the north.

== Flora and fauna ==
Høstemark and Tofte forests and bogs^{da} have been undisturbed habitats for flora and fauna. There are many species of plants including Sphagnum moss, heather, bell heather, crowberry, rosemary heather, cranberries, white beak rush and tue-cottongrass; a rare plant is cloudberry. Flowering plants grow on the peat sponge. There are no trees within the main sections of the bog, however birch and willow are recorded in the bog's wooded marginal zones known as "lagg".

Around 550 red deer live in Lille Vildmose, along with species such as wild boars, otters, foxes and roe deer. Golden jackal and wolf, which have recently expanded their ranges into Denmark from Germany, have been recorded in Lille Vildmose since 2016 and 2021 respectively. The area is a breeding ground for golden eagles and white-tailed eagles. Among the numerous other birds that can be found in the bog are cormorants, cranes, ravens, red kites, eastern marsh harrier, short-eared owls. Several waterfowl breed in Tofte Lake, which is also home to migrating ducks during the fall, winter and spring.

In September 2011, a large common European conservation programme was initiated for Lille Vildmose under the LIFE Programme. It was budgeted at €5,5 million and was scheduled to terminate in 2016.

=== Reintroduced megafauna ===
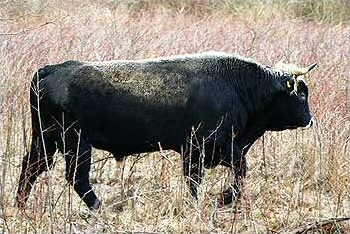
The Taurus bull ″Leonardo″ (Chianina × Heck) from Lille Vildmose, 2004

In 2003, Projekt Urokse ('Project Aurochs') was initiated in Lille Vildmose, in which several domestic cattle races were selected for their similarity to the extinct aurochs, a species that disappeared from Denmark more than 2,500 years ago. This was part of the Taurus Project that had been initiated in Germany in 1996. The founding herd, all of which were released under controlled conditions, consisted of one Chianina × Heck bull, four Heck cows and one Sayaguesa × Heck cow, and in 2009 three Sayaguesa bulls were added. This population rapidly increase and had reached about 100 individuals in 2015. However, while they had achieved the goal of diversifying the nature in Lille Vildmose, they required extensive maintenance (also because they were covered by the same laws as fully captive cattle) and in 2015 it was decided that they would be moved elsewhere.

The moose, a species that disappeared from Denmark about 4,500 years ago, was chosen as the megafaunal species that would replace the cattle and in 2016-17 ten were introduced to Lille Vildmose from Sweden. The species thrived and by 2020 there were around 25 moose in Lille Vildmose. In 2019-21, European bison, another species that disappeared from Denmark several thousand years ago, was introduced to the Tofte forest in Lille Vildmose.
