= Canadian Rustic Pony =

Breed of horse

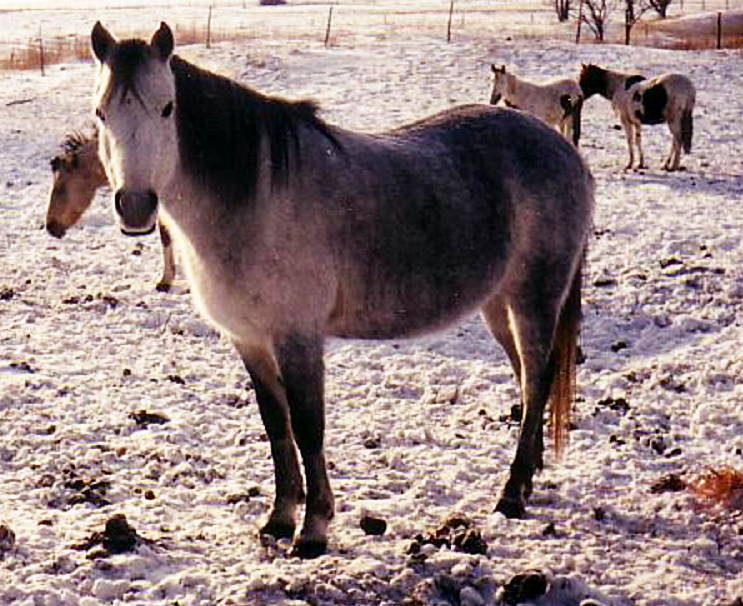
- Canadian Rustic Pony
- Country of origin: Canada

The Canadian Rustic Pony is a breed of pony that originated in Canada, particularly Saskatchewan and Manitoba. The pony is the result of a crossing between the Heck horse and Welsh pony-Arabian horse crosses.

== History ==
The Canadian Rustic Pony was developed by Dr. Peter Neufeld of Manitoba, Canada. Breeders developed the breed by crossing Heck horses from the Atlanta Zoo in Atlanta, Georgia, with Arabian horse-Welsh pony crosses. On January 23, 1989, the Canadian Rustic Pony Association was formed, incorporated under the new Canadian federal Animal Pedigree Act, also known as Bill C-67. Prior to this, since 1978, Canadian rustic ponies had been registered through a registry based in the United States, and as of September 1989, 72 ponies had been US-registered. These ponies were eligible to become double-registered under the Canadian and US registries, and many did so. No ponies were found outside of Manitoba and Saskatchewan as of September 1989, but this was expected to change as more breeders became aware of the new breed.

== Characteristics ==
These ponies stand between 12.2 and 13.2 hands (50 and 54 inches, 127 and 137 cm) high. They can be gray, buckskin, dun or bay, have primitive markings such as dorsal and zebra stripes, and have partially raised manes. The facial profile is straight or slightly dished, with a prominent jaw. The neck is thick but arched, the girth and shoulders thick, and the croup slightly sloping. The legs are strong, and the ponies are said to move fluidly, especially at the trot. The Canadian Rustic Pony is used mainly for jumping, driving or as family pets.
