= Hellabrunn Zoo =

Zoo in Munich, Germany

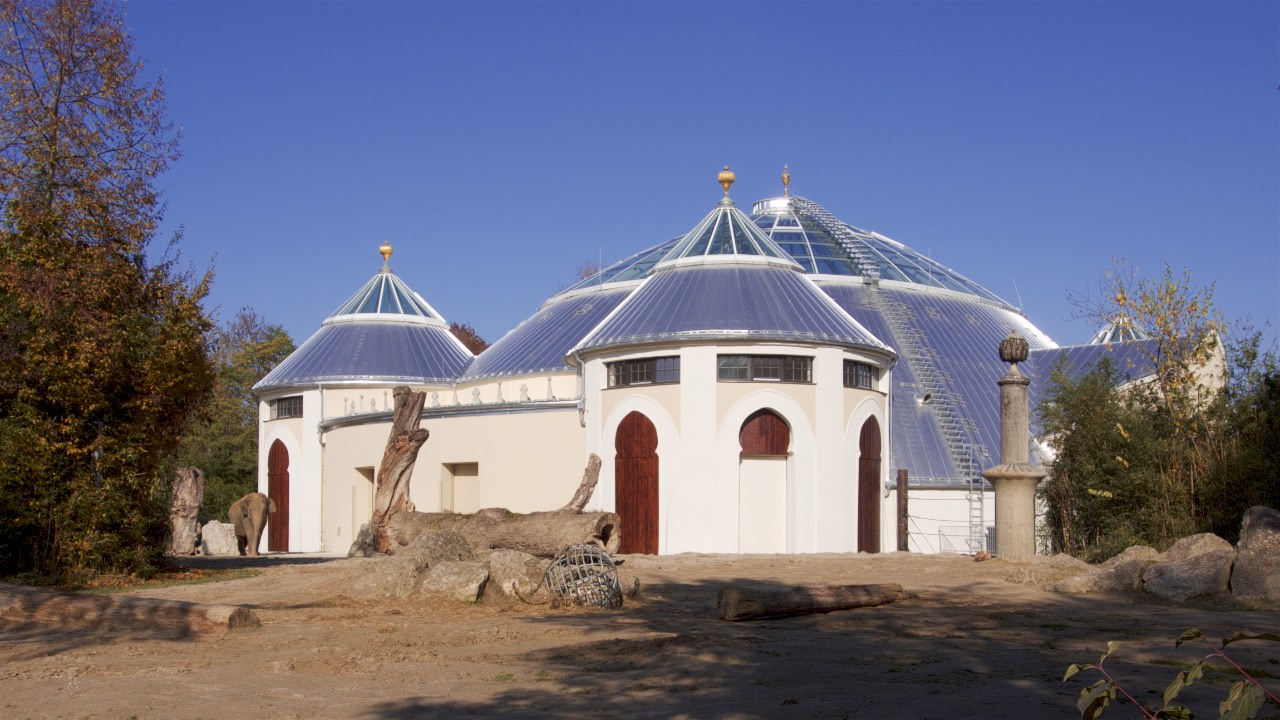
- The elephant house was built in 1914.
- Interactive map of Hellabrunn Zoo
- 48°5′50″N 11°33′15″E
- Date opened: 1 August 1911
- Location: Munich, Germany
- Land area: 40 ha (99 acres)
- No. of animals: 18,943 (2014)
- No. of species: 499 (2024)
- Annual visitors: 1,897,268 (2024)
- Memberships: EAZA, WAZA
- Website: www.hellabrunn.de

Hellabrunn Zoo (German: Tierpark Hellabrunn) is a 40 hectare (99 acre) zoological garden in the Bavarian capital of Munich. The zoo is situated on the right bank of the river Isar, in the southern part of Munich near the quarter of Thalkirchen.

A high ratio of enclosures are cageless, relying upon moat features to keep the animals in place. The zoo was the first zoo in the world not organized by species, but also by geographical aspects. For example, the wood bison share their enclosure with prairie dogs.

In 2013, the zoo was ranked the fourth best zoo in Europe (up from 12th). It focuses on conservation and captive breeding rare species such as the rare drill and silvery gibbons. Also gorillas, giraffes, elephants, wood bisons, elk and Arctic foxes were successfully bred in the zoo, which houses many species. It is one of the very few zoos that allows visitors to bring dogs.

Tierpark Hellabrunn is a member of the European Association of Zoos and Aquaria (EAZA) and the World Association of Zoos and Aquariums (WAZA) and participates in the European Endangered Species Programme (EEP).

== History ==
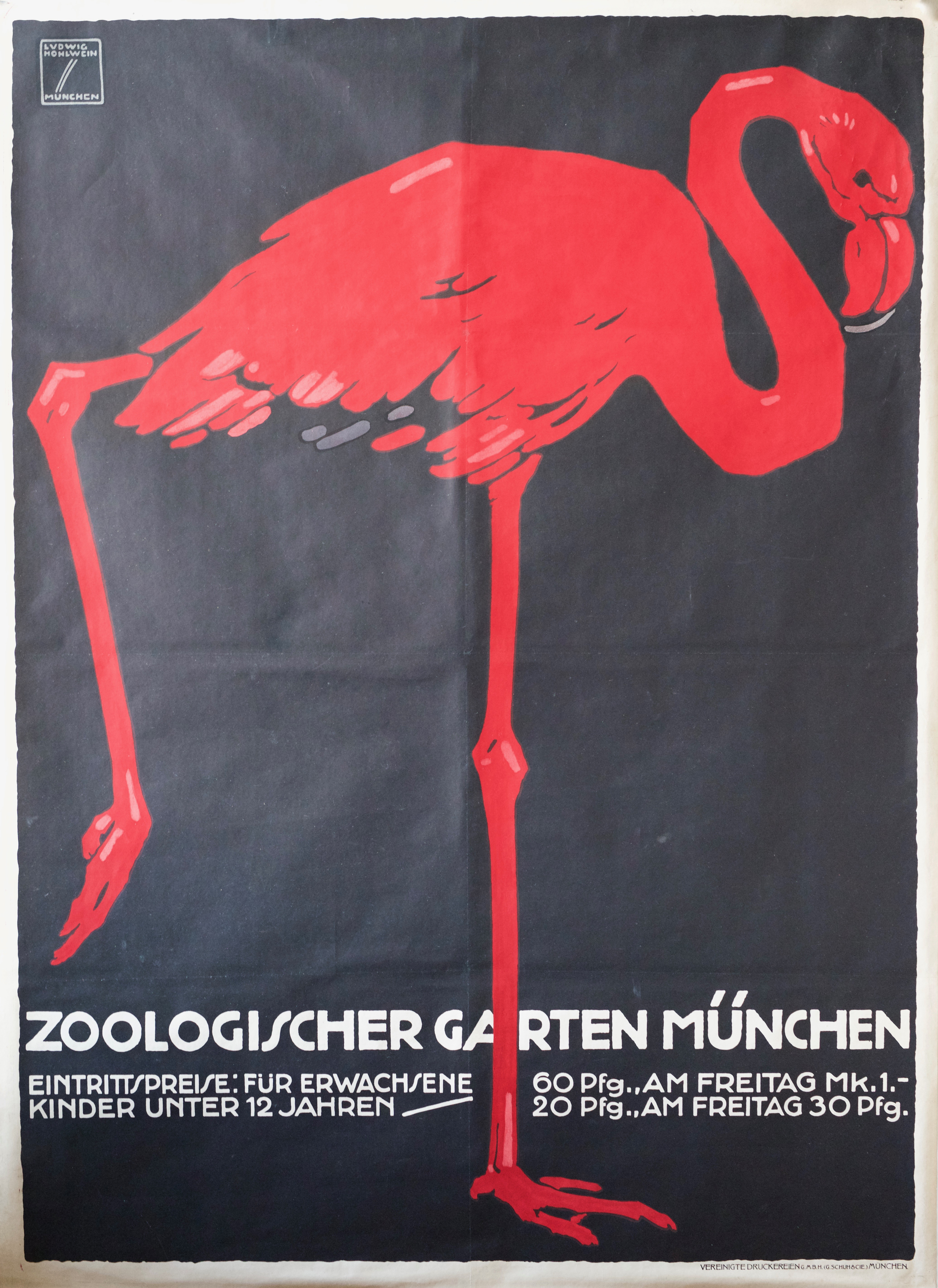
Advertising from Ludwig Hohlwein for Hellabrunn Zoo (1912)

On 25 February 1905 the Verein Zoologischer Garten München e.V. (transl. Society of the Zoological Garden of Munich) was founded and the Hellabrunn area was chosen as the location for the zoo. The zoo was designed by architect Emanuel von Seidl, and opened to the public on 1 August 1911.

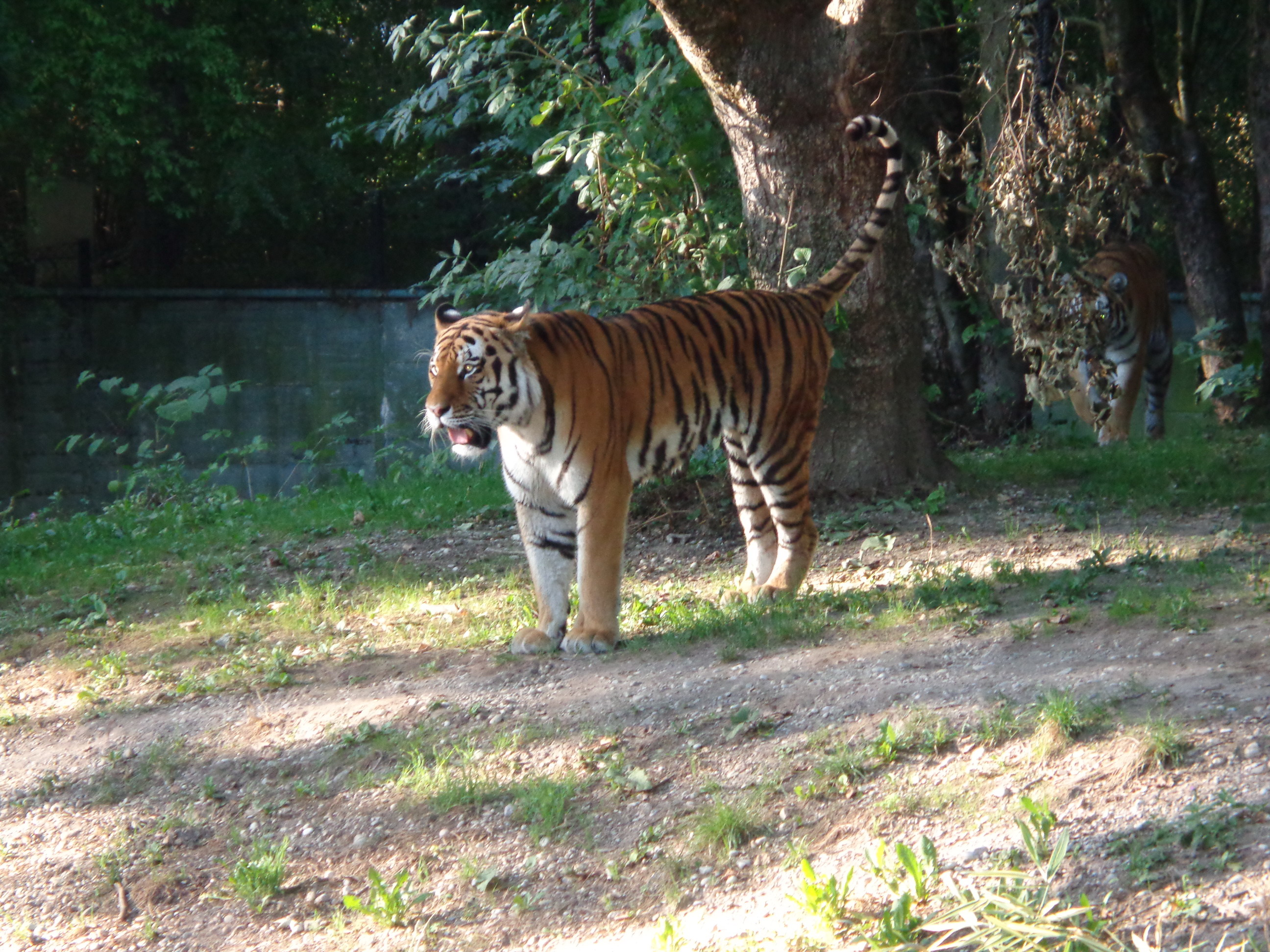
A pair of Siberian tigers walking

In 1922, the zoo was closed due to the inflation in Germany. It was re-opened on 23 May 1928. It became the first Geo-Zoo in the world (animals were shown and kept with other animals of the same geographic region). It also engaged in controversial back-breeding to "recreate" extinct animals like Heck cattle (to mimic the Aurochs) and the Tarpan.

Lutz Heck was a renowned zoologist in Nazi Germany, his brother Heinz Heck was director of Hellabrunn Zoo at the time. During World War II, the zoo sustained extensive damage due to strategic bombing by the Allies of World War II, but the zoo was able to reopen in May 1945.

In 1970, a badly needed plan for the renovation of the zoo was drawn up.

=== Today ===
In 2024, Hellabrunn housed "several thousand animals" across 500 different species. The Zoo was previously home to 18,943 animals in 2014.

The Tierpark Hellabrunn has breeding, reintroduction and conservation projects.

Over 1.8 million people visited Hellabrunn in 2024.

As the groundwater level here is rather high and the water is of very good quality, the zoo can cover its needs for freshwater by using its own wells.

== Attractions ==
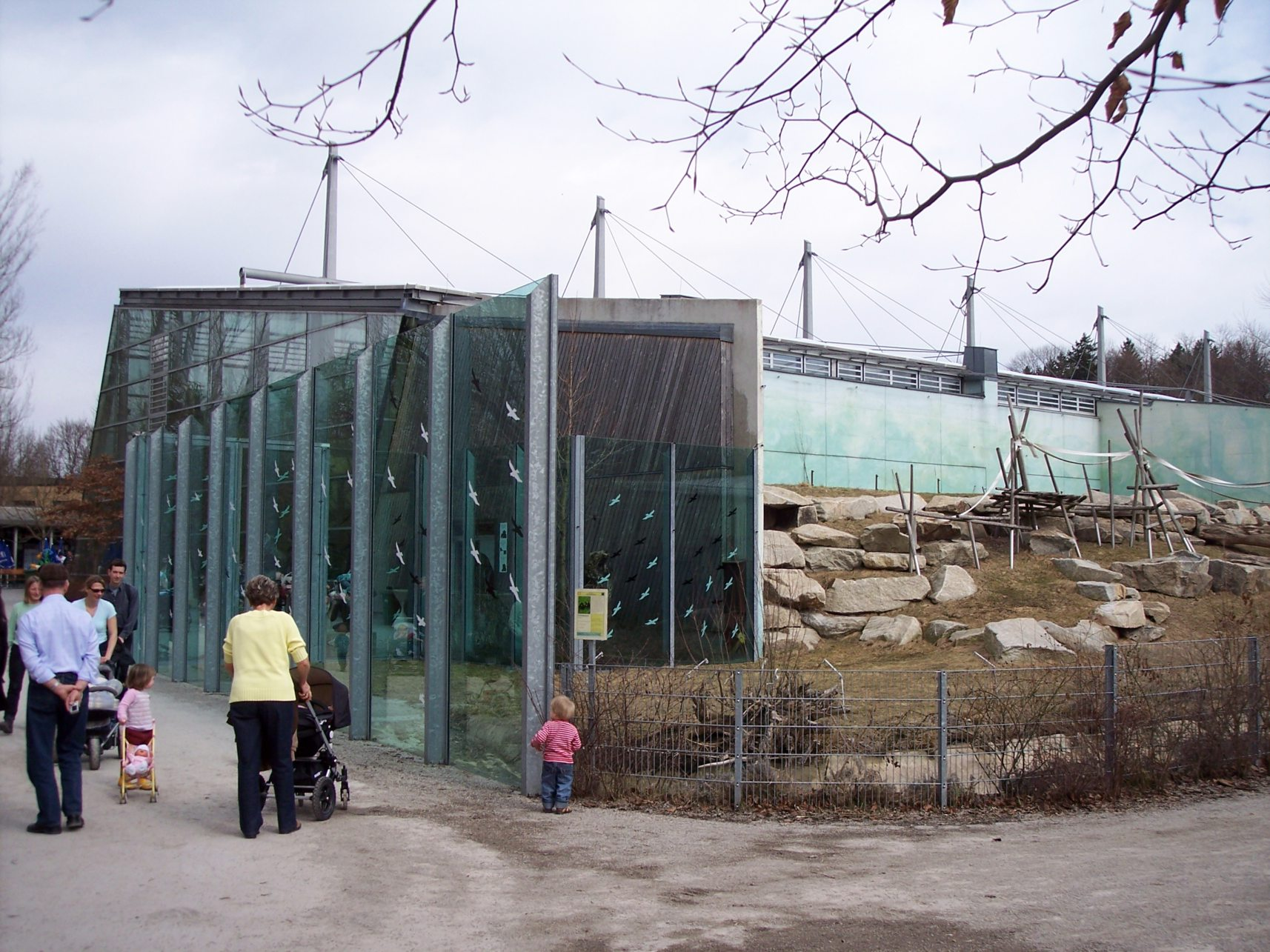
The jungle house was finished in 2005.

- The Elephant House was constructed in 1914 and renovated in 2011 through 2016.
- The Jungle House contains gorillas, chimpanzees, Diana monkeys and American alligators.
- Rare and acrobatic silvery gibbons, spider monkeys, as well as rare drills.
- The Savannah House in which only a glass wall separates the visitors from the giraffes.
- The aquarium with piranha feedings.
- "Dracula's Villa" in which bats fly among visitors.
- Many other buildings like the "Polarium".
