= Heinz Heck =

German biologist (1894–1982)

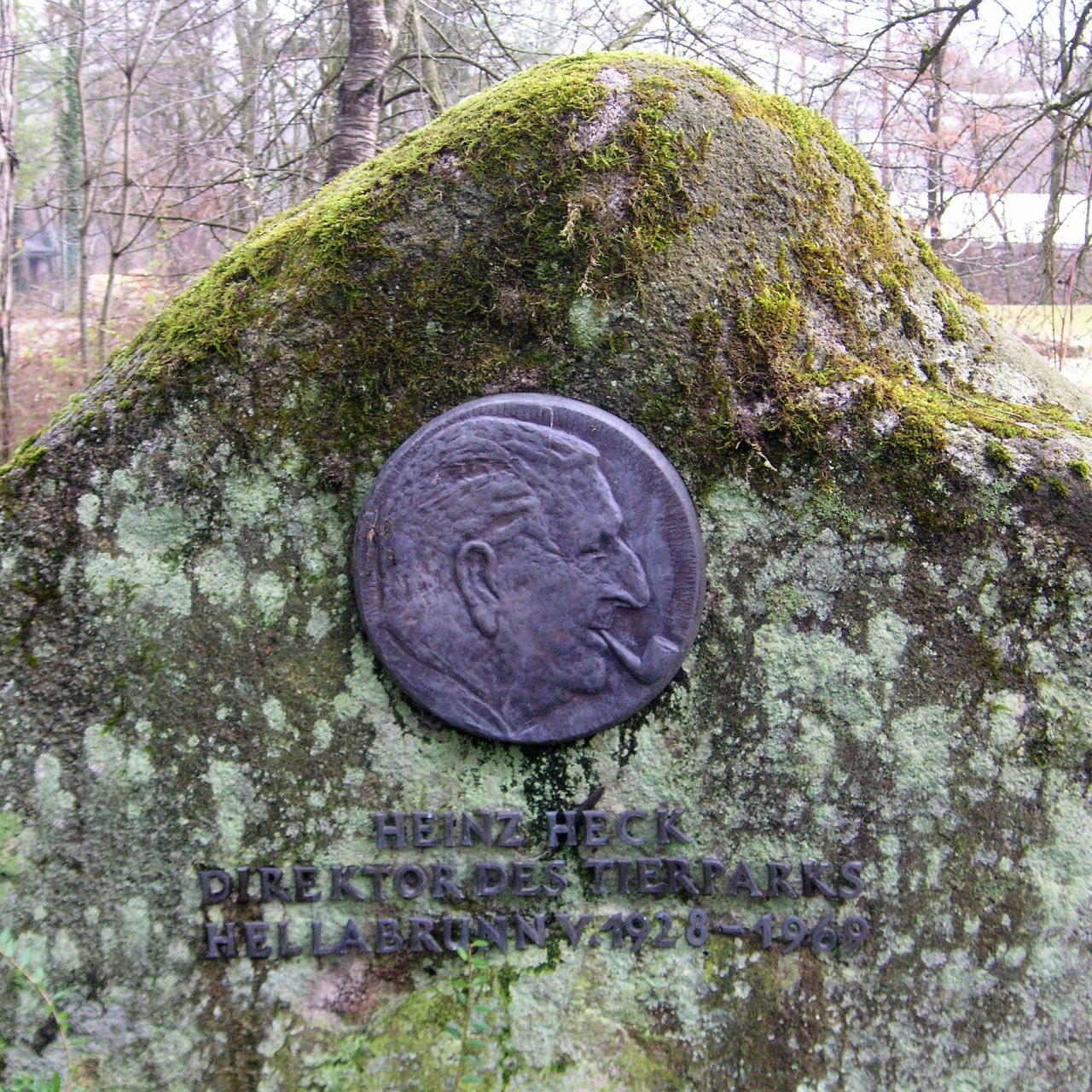
Memorial to Heinz Heck at Hellabrunn Zoo

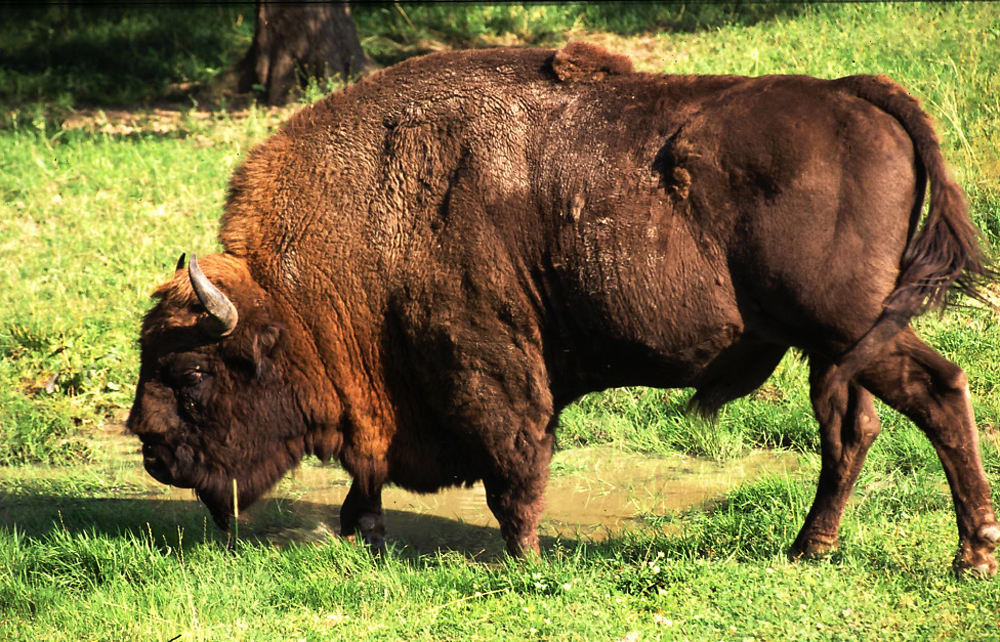
European bison (Bison bonasus) reintroduced into Białowieża Forest

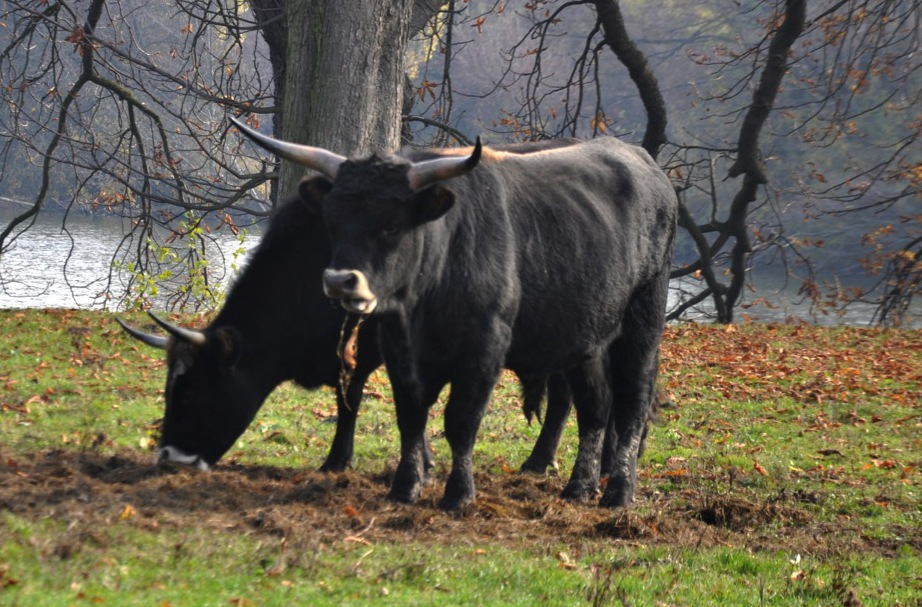
Heck cattle: an attempt from the 1920s to breed a look-alike aurochs from modern cattle

Heinz Heck (22 January 1894 – 5 March 1982) was a German biologist and director of Hellabrunn Zoo (Tierpark Hellabrunn) in Munich. He was born in Berlin and died in Munich.

His father was Ludwig Heck, German biologist and zoo director. With Heinz's brother, Lutz Heck, who was director of the Berlin Zoological Garden, Heinz worked on two breeding back projects to recreate extinct species. The Heck horse aimed to recreate the tarpan, and the Heck cattle, aimed to recreate the aurochs, the wild cattle of the European forest.

This work has been criticised on grounds that once an animal is extinct, it cannot re-exist. This was contrary to Heck's view, which is that while genes of an extinct animal still exist in extant descendants, the animal could still be recreated. Under Nazi Germany, Heinz Heck was among the first political prisoners to be interned—and later released—in Dachau for suspected membership in the Communist Party and for his brief marriage to a Jewish woman.

Heck also played an important part in saving the European bison (wisent) from extinction when the majority of its population of about 90 survived in captivity in Germany following great losses to the species during World War I. To help manage the survival of the European bison from the remaining captive population, he commenced the first studbook for a non-domestic species, initially as a card index in 1923, leading to a full publication in 1932. Thanks to Heck's efforts, the European bison population has significantly increased and the species has been re-released into the wild.

A German immigrant to the US, Roland Lindemann, opened a privately owned zoo in New York, the Catskill Game Farm, in 1933. In 1959, Lindemann hired Heck to serve as zoological director of the Catskill Game Farm, and Heck moved to the US to do so. Heck (known in the US as "George") served in that role for several years. While at the Catskill Game Farm, Heck worked with his father and brother to bring their experimental breeds of animals to the zoo. His work during that time is the topic of the 2026 documentary film American Zoo.
