= Heck cattle =

German breed of cattle

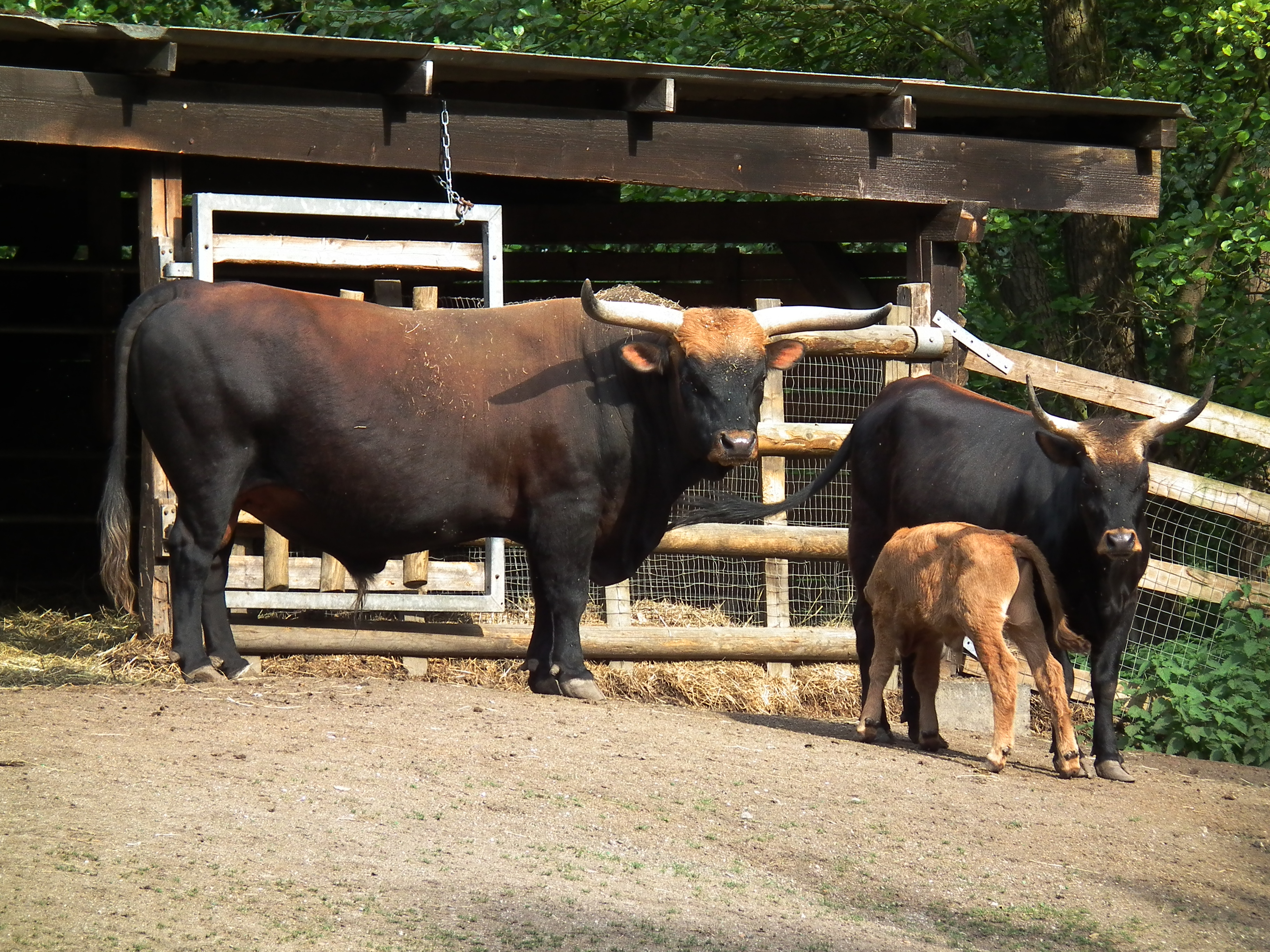
- Bull, cow and calf in the Rheingönheim Wildlife Park of Ludwigshafen
- Other names: Aurochs de Heck; Aurochs Reconstitué; Heckrind; Munich-Berlin
- Country of origin: Germany
- Distribution: France; Germany; Netherlands; United Kingdom; Ukraine

Traits
- Weight: Male: 600–900 kg; Female: 400–600 kg
- Height: Male: approximately 140 cm; Female: approximately 130 cm
- Coat: shades of red, brown, black
- Horn status: horns of various shapes and sizes
- Cattle; Bos (primigenius) taurus

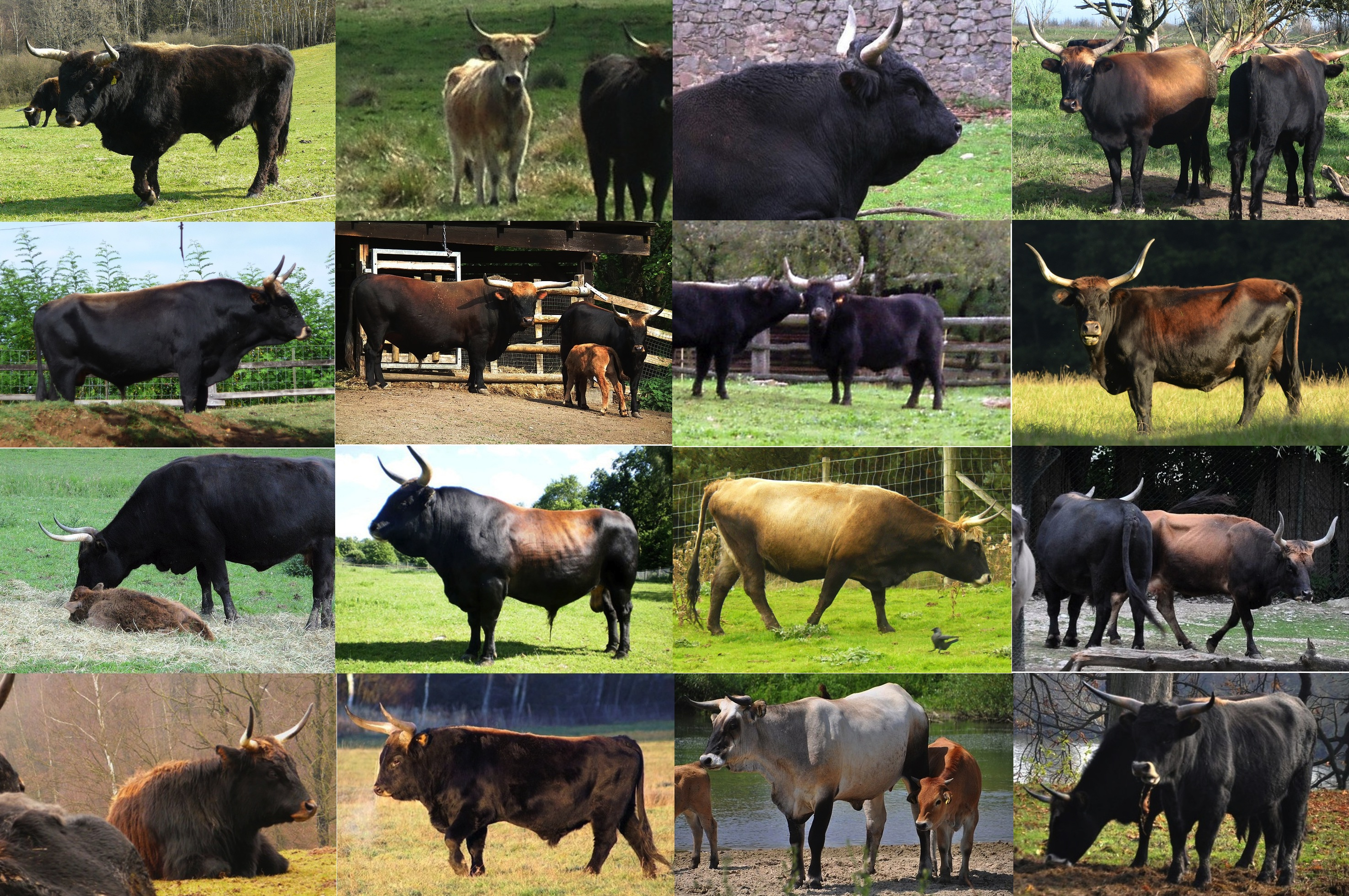
The cattle show a range of colours and phenotypes.

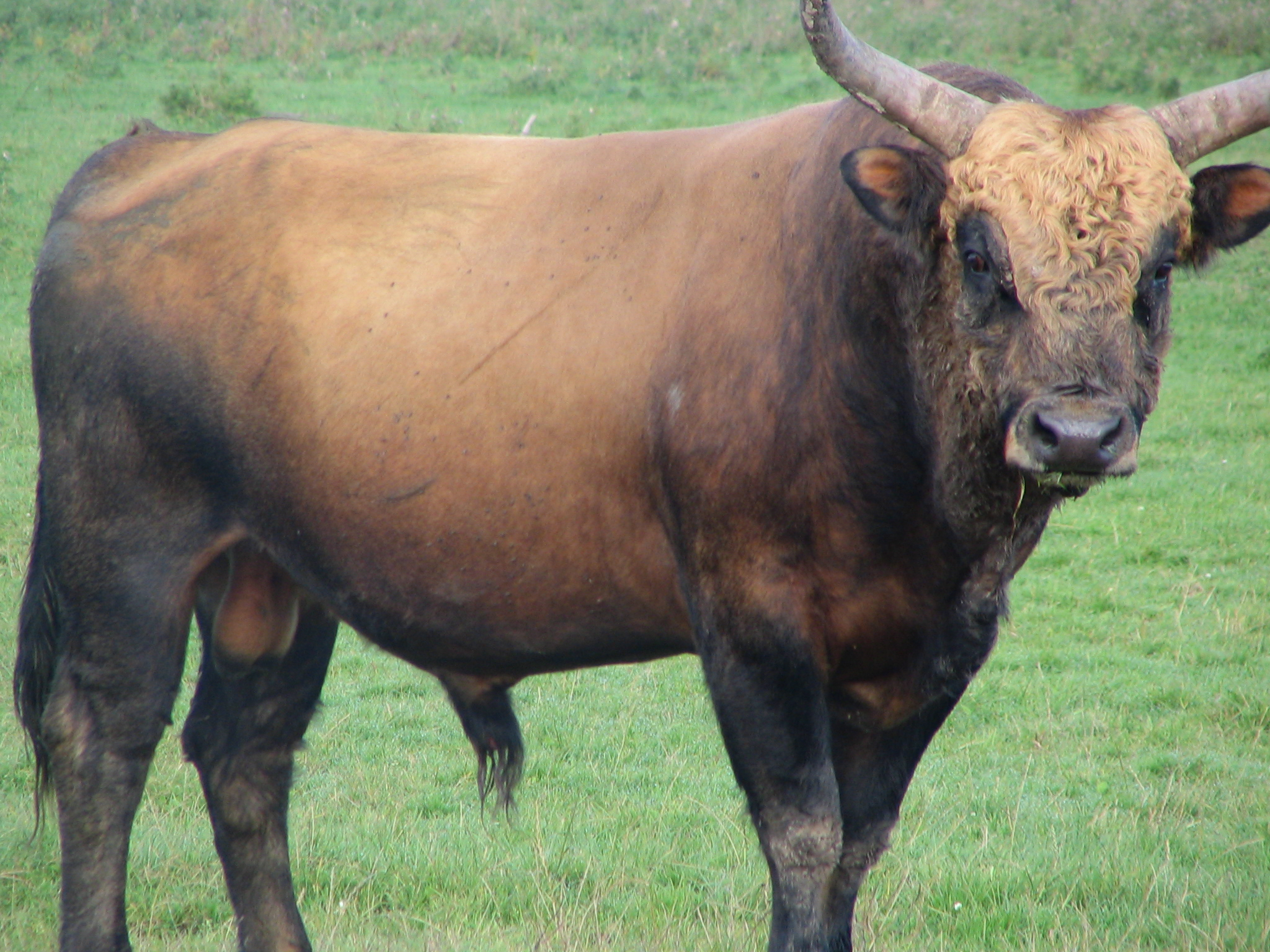
Bull in the Oostvaardersplassen nature reserve

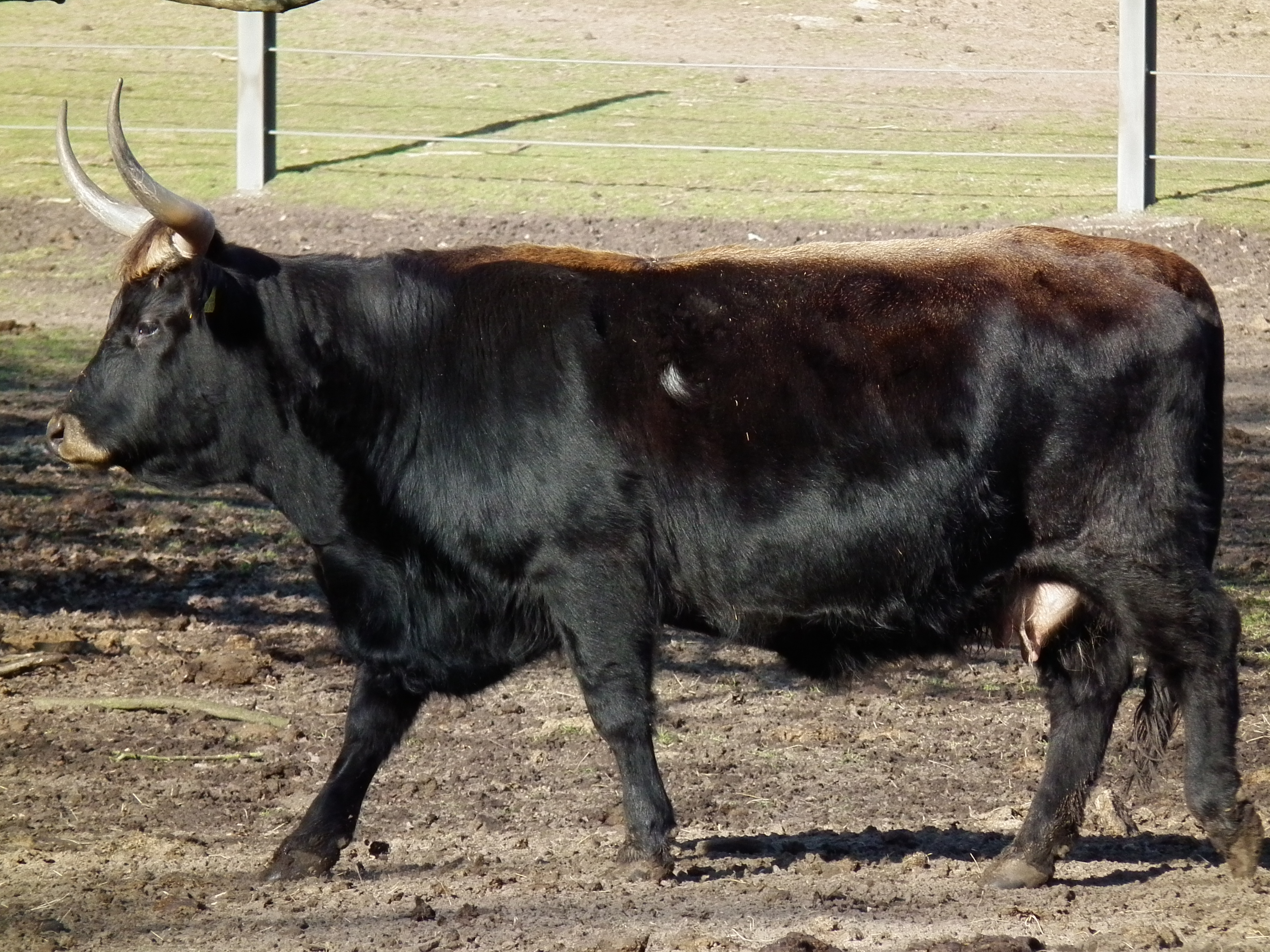
Cow at Mannheim

The Heck or Munich-Berlin is a German breed or type of domestic cattle. It was bred in the 1920s by Heinz and Lutz Heck in an attempt to breed back the extinct aurochs (Bos primigenius). Controversy revolves around methodology and success of the programme. There are considerable differences between Heck cattle and the aurochs in build, height, and body proportions. Furthermore, there are other cattle breeds which resemble their wild ancestors at least as much as Heck cattle.

== History ==
Heck cattle originated in Germany in the 1920s and 1930s in an attempt to breed back domestic cattle to their ancestral form: the aurochs (Bos primigenius primigenius). In the first years of the Weimar Republic, the brothers Heinz and Lutz Heck independently started their extensive breeding-back programmes.

Their motivation was to rescue the aurochs from oblivion because it was constantly confused with the European bison, the other large bovine of Holocene Europe. The Heck brothers believed that creating a look-alike and showing both species next to each other would help to show the difference between the two species to a broader public. Apart from that, they believed they were able to reconstruct the species and therefore to correct the mistake man made when killing the species off.

Heinz was the director of the Hellabrunn Zoological Gardens in Munich and Lutz of the Berlin Zoological Gardens. Only eleven years after they started their breeding experiments, just as the Weimar Republic was drawing to a close, they each announced success.

Lutz Heck used Spanish Fighting Bulls for his breed, some of which were released in the Polish Romincka Forest, but survived until the late 1940s when they were killed during the end of the Second World War. Rewilding Lutz Heck's cattle breed was met with objection since the beginnings of this project, as these cattle were aggressive and their ecological impact on the native fauna was considered to be unpredictable. Later rewilding attempts in Poland were rejected.

Lutz Heck's cattle were exterminated at the end of the Second World war. Heinz Heck used a different set of breeds; all living Heck cattle go back to his stock. The ancestral breeds used by Heinz Heck include:

- Hungarian Grey
- Highland cattle
- Corsican cattle
- Murnau-Werdenfels
- Angeln cattle
- German Black Pied cattle
- White Park cattle
- Brown Swiss

In 1932 the first bull that Heinz Heck believed to resemble the aurochs was born and named Glachl. He was a 75% Corsican and 25% (Grey cattle × Lowland × Highland × Angeln) cross. This bull and his father were subsequently bred into further breeds to increase weight. As a consequence most modern Heck cattle go back to Central European dairy and beef cattle that were supplemented by cattle from other regions. Advocates of Heck cattle often claim that Heinz' and Lutz' breeding results looked largely identical, thus "proving the success" of their experiment. However, Berlin and Munich Heck cattle did not look very similar.

=== Distribution ===
There are about 2000 Heck cattle in Europe, and a few elsewhere. Heck cattle are found in German zoos because of the erroneous claim by the Heck brothers that these cattle represent resurrected aurochs and are suitable for conservation projects today. In Oostvaardersplassen in Flevoland (Netherlands), about 600 Heck cattle roam freely. Weak animals are shot by hunters in order to prevent unnecessary suffering. Others are at the Falkenthaler Rieselfelder near Berlin, at the Nesseaue nature reserve near Erfurt, Thuringia and at the Grubenfelder Leonie nature reserve in Auerbach, Bavaria. About 100 were registered in France in 2000. The introduction of Heck cattle into nature reserves in order to restore ancient landscapes inspired Rewilding Europe. The way of no interference in the Oostvaardersplassen, however, was terminated in 2018, as large numbers of animals died of starvation during the cold winters of 2005 and 2010, which caused a loss of public support. A small population of Hecks lives in the Beremytske Nature Park in the Chernihiv region of Ukraine.

=== Criticism ===
Criticism of the methodology and result of the Heck brothers' programs dates back to at least the 1950s. Cis van Vuure describes the work of W. Herre in 1953 and O. Koehler in 1952:

A lack of basic knowledge about the extinct aurochs, broad selection criteria [of breeds chosen to create the cattle] ... and the rich imagination and complacency of the two brothers led to their excessive simplification of the breeding-back procedure.

Criticism also focused on the carelessness, the ease and the speed with which they had carried out their experiments as well as the genetic basis. Cis van Vuure further stated that:

On account of the absence of any marked similarity in size, colour, and horn shape, among other aspects, Heck cattle cannot be considered to resemble the aurochs closely. Rather they should be seen as a population of cattle in which a few aurochs characteristics may be found; a trait they share with many other cattle populations.

In the view of some experts, primitive Southern European cattle breeds are much closer overall to the aurochs than Heck cattle, such as the Spanish fighting bull.

== Characteristics ==
A typical bull stands on average 1.4 m (4.6 ft) tall, and a cow 1.3 m (4.3 ft), with weight up to 600 kg (1,300 lb). Heck cattle are 20–30 cm (7.9–11.8 in) shorter than the aurochs they were bred to resemble. Heck bulls are not larger than other domestic bulls and actually a little smaller than cattle used in modern intensive agriculture, whilst aurochs bulls reached shoulder heights of 1.6–1.8 m (5.2–5.9 ft) and in rare cases even 2 m (6.6 ft). Aurochs bulls are thought to have weighed some 700–1,000 kg (1,500–2,200 lb).

Size is not the only aspect in which Heck cattle differ from their wild ancestor. Heck cattle are bulky like many other domestic breeds, whilst the aurochs, as a wild bovine, had an athletic body shape. The legs of Heck cattle are shorter and the trunk much longer than in the aurochs, in which shoulder height and trunk length nearly equalled each other. Heck cattle have a comparatively small and short head, whilst aurochs had a large elongated head sitting on a muscular neck. Aurochs had well-developed shoulder musculature, carried by long spines, which is absent in Heck cattle. All in all, proportions and body shape of Heck cattle are not significantly similar to the aurochs and do not differ from many other domestic breeds.

The horns of the aurochs had a characteristic and relatively stable shape. At the base they grew outwards-upwards, then forwards-inwards and inwards-upwards at the tips. Aurochs horns were large and thick overall, reaching 80–100 cm (31–39 in) in length and 10 cm (3.9 in) or more in diameter. However the horns of Heck cattle differ in many respects. Usually they curve too much upwards or outwards compared with the original or do not reach the length or diameter of the aurochs. Often the horns of Heck cattle strongly resemble the breeds it was created from.

In coat colour Heck cattle may resemble the aurochs, the bulls having a black overall coat colour with a light eel stripe and cows displaying a reddish-brown colour. However some Heck bulls may have a light-coloured saddle (which was apparently not present in the European aurochs) and the sexual dimorphism in colour is unclear in most cases; bulls and cows may be dark with a light-coloured saddle, black cows appear regularly and light-coloured bulls are no rarity. There are other deviant colours too, such as individuals having a greyish or grey colour and cows being beige. White patches, typical of pied dairy breeds, appear as well, sometimes to the same extent as in Holstein cattle.

Heck cattle demonstrate a higher amount of heterogeneity than any wild animal or most other domestic breeds. There is considerable variation in coat colour, horn shape and horn dimensions, as well as size and proportions. Besides the features that are desired because they bear resemblance to the aurochs, numerous divergent features may appear (as explained above).

Heck cattle differ in many respects from the aurochs, and there are breeds that resemble the aurochs at least as much, such as the Spanish fighting bull. Nevertheless, they are capable of coping in the wild with cold temperatures or nutrient-poor food. On the other hand, there are other robust cattle breeds that cope with harsh conditions at least as well as Heck cattle, and feral cattle are no rarity.

== Use ==
Heck cattle have been used in breeding-back projects aimed at creating cattle with closer similarity to the aurochs, such as the German Projekt Taurus and the Dutch Tauros Programme.

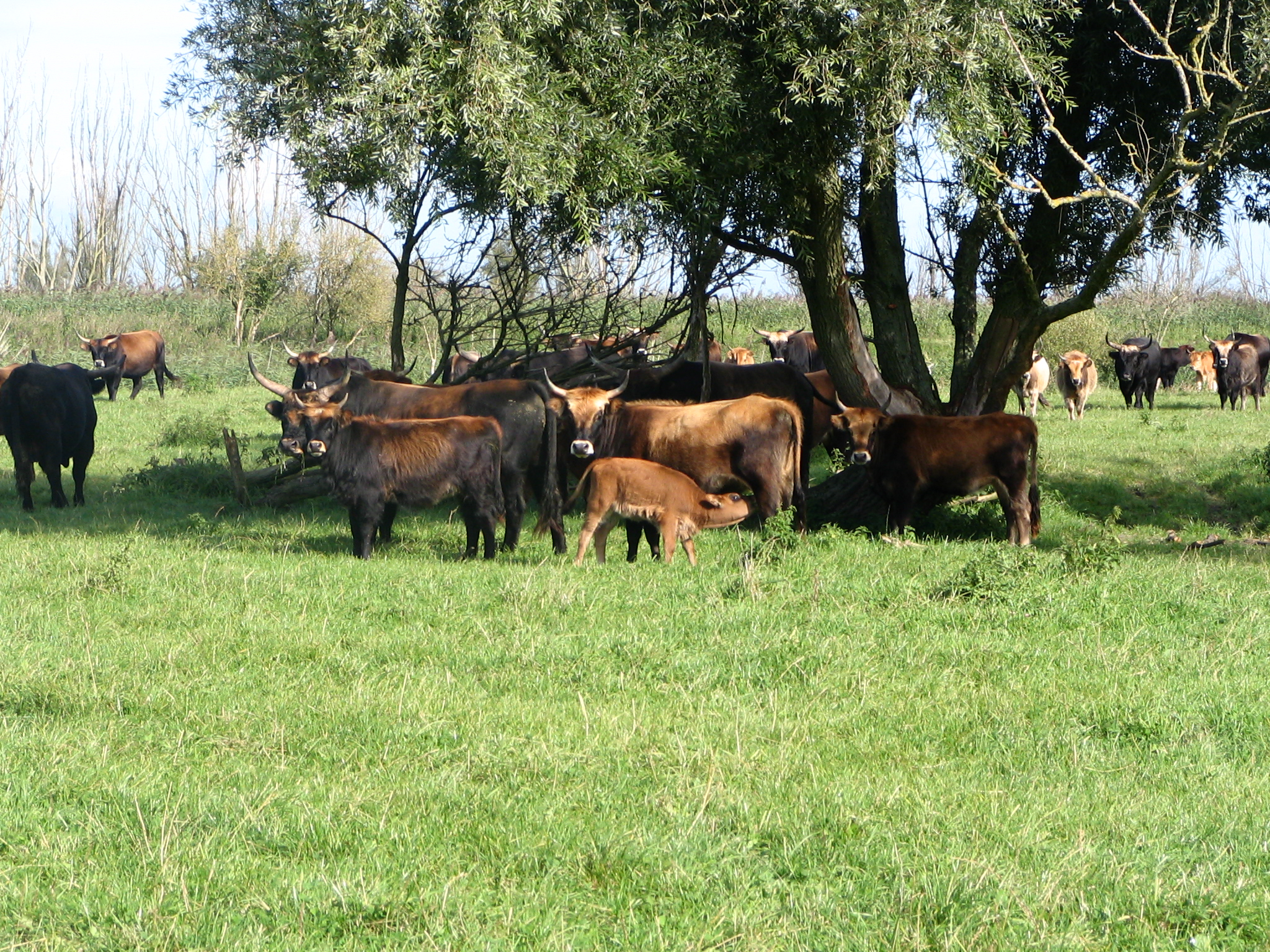

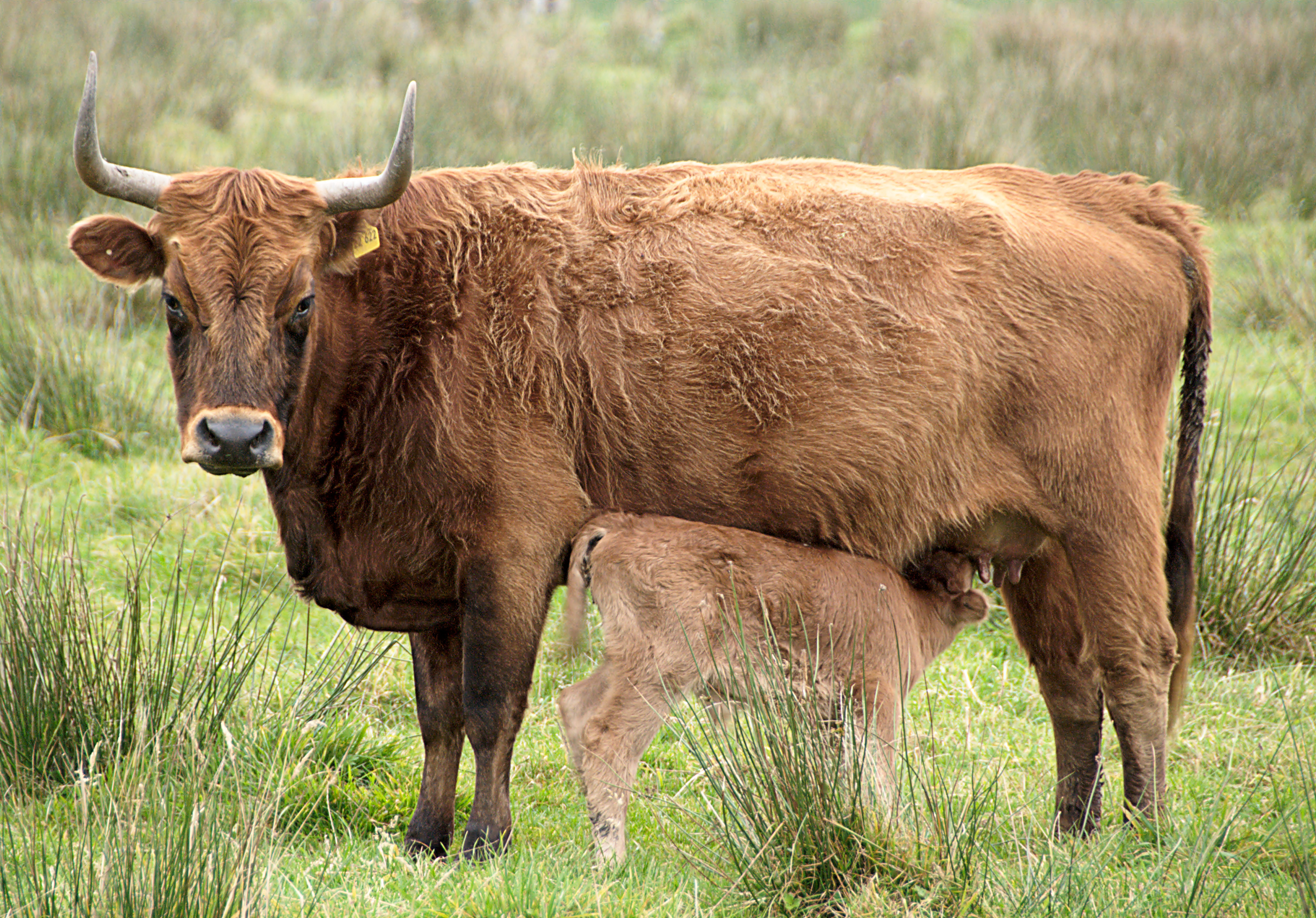

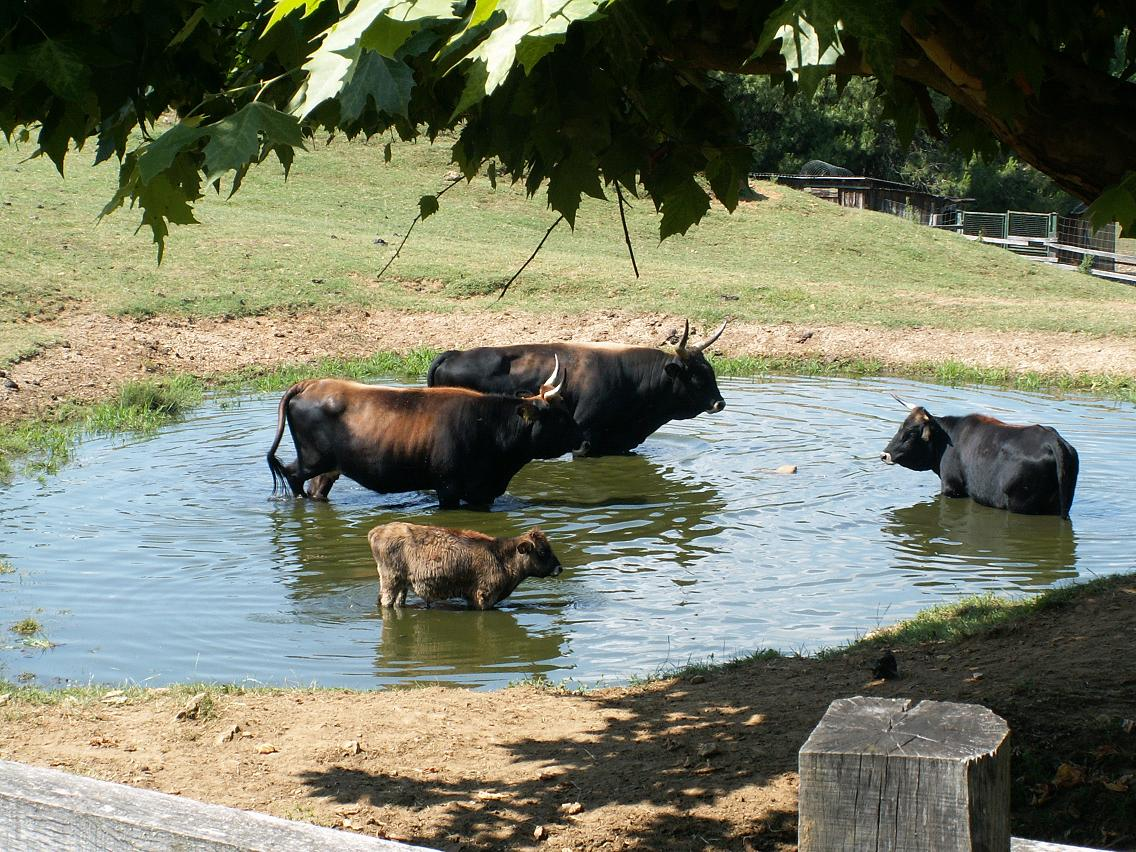

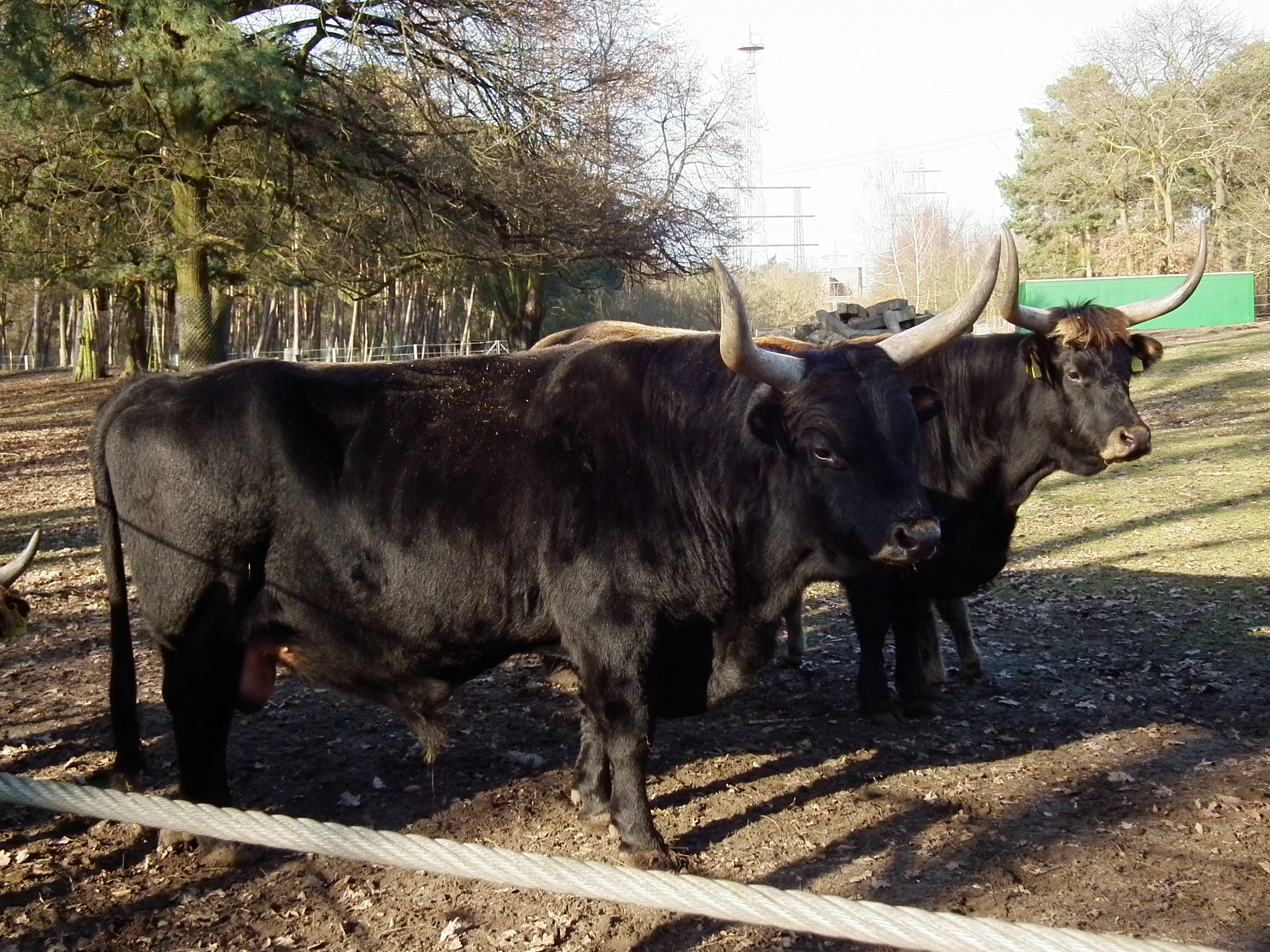

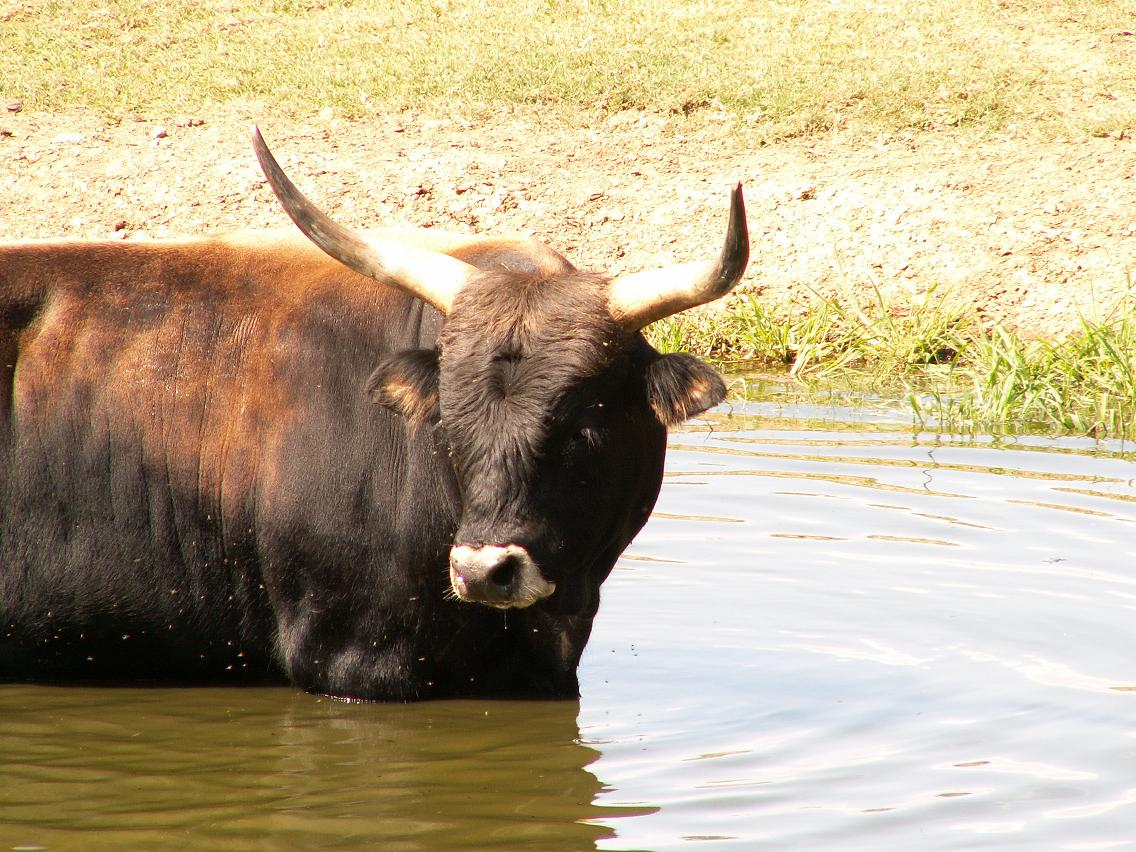

== See also ==
- Heck horse
- Tauros Programme
- Taurus Project
