= Taurus Project =

German cattle-breeding project

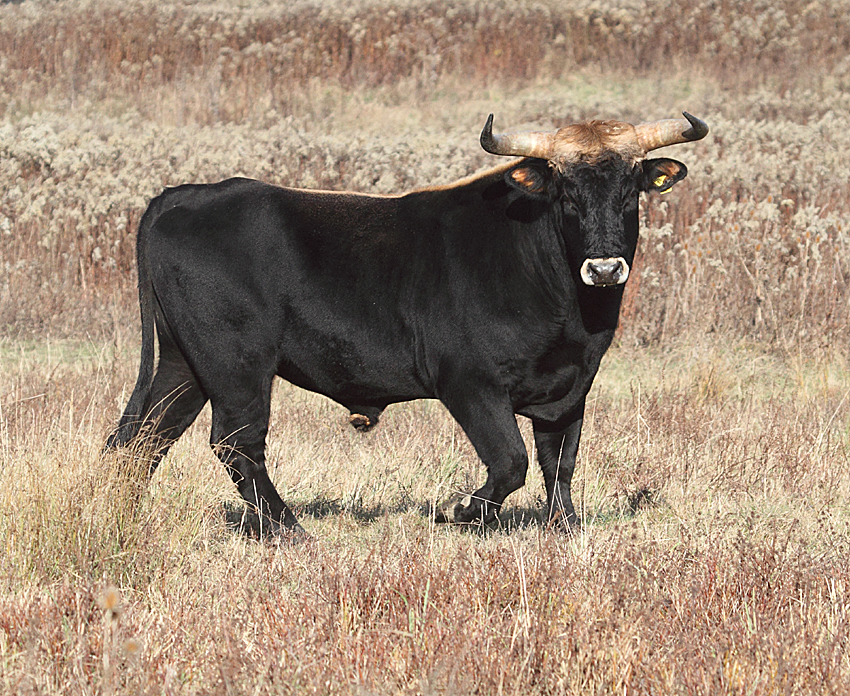
The Taurus bull "Lamarck" (50% Sayaguesa, 25% Heck, 25% Chianina) in the Lippeaue reserve in North Rhine-Westphalia

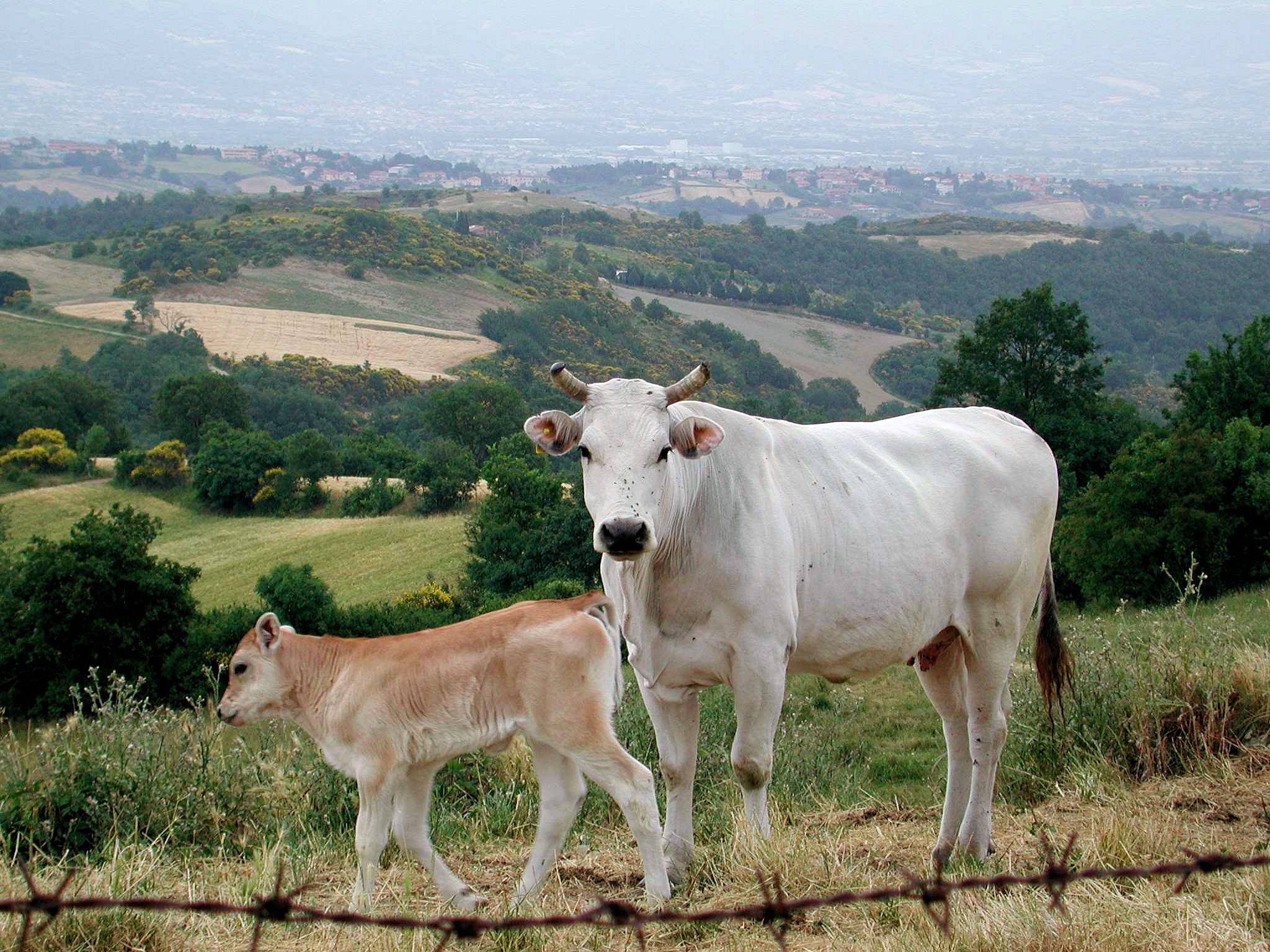
Chianina is one of the breeds that are used in breeding Taurus cattle.

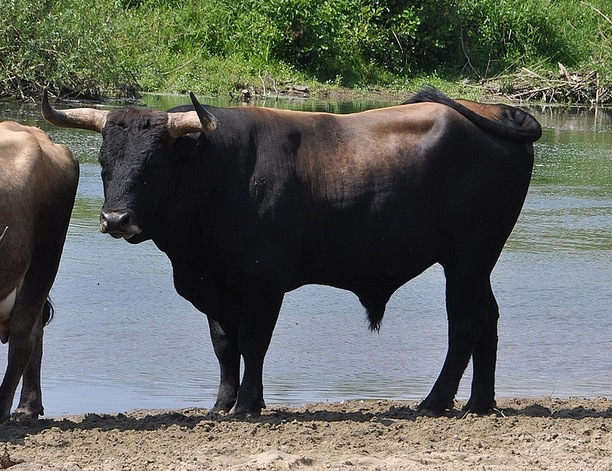
Taurus bull

The Taurus Project of the German Arbeitsgemeinschaft Biologischer Umweltschutz aims to re-create the extinct aurochs, the wild ancestor of domestic cattle, by cross-breeding Heck cattle (themselves bred in the 1920s and 1930s in an attempt to replicate the aurochs) with aurochs-like cattle, mostly from Southern Europe. Herds of these cross-bred Taurus cattle have been established in Germany, Denmark, Hungary and Latvia, and are used in conservation of natural landscapes and biodiversity.

== History ==
In 1996 the conservation group Arbeitsgemeinschaft Biologischer Umweltschutz in Germany started to crossbreed Heck cattle with primitive cattle from Southern Europe such as Chianina, Sayaguesa Cattle and the Spanish fighting bull in the Lippeaue reserve near the town of Soest. The purpose was and is an increased resemblance to the extinct aurochs, because they considered Heck cattle not satisfying. For example, they write in one of their publications: "The 'recreations' by the Heck brothers are too small, too short-legged, not elegant and their horns are not satisfying". Therefore, the goal is to breed cattle that are considerably larger, more long-legged and long-snouted and have horns curving forwards, in addition to possessing the wild type colour scheme that was already present in the population. In 2003 breeding herds were started in Hungary and Denmark, and in 2004 one was begun in Latvia.

=== Germany ===
In Germany, Taurus cattle herds are crossed with Chianina and Sayaguesa, two very tall breeds, and initially also the Spanish fighting bull (Toro de Lidia). The crossbred animals in the Lippeaue reserve, the most important breeding location, are composed of 47% Sayaguesa, 29% Heck cattle, 20% Chianina and 4% Lidia on average.

Taurus cattle are listed in the herdbook X of the German Heck cattle association VFA. There is an increasing interest of Heck cattle breeders in using Taurus cattle because of their larger resemblance to the aurochs, so that there is a continuum between Taurus cattle and un-crossed Heck cattle.

=== Hungary ===
Hortobágy National Park in Hungary has the largest herd of Taurus cattle so far. In 2012, the herd counted 500–600 individuals of which around 200 are mature cows. In addition to crossbred cattle that were imported from Germany, Ankole-Watusi, Hungarian Grey cattle crosses and one half-Holstein Friesian cow are used. There are two sub-herds, a main herd at Pentezug and another one at Karácsonyfok. Studies in the national park showed that cattle are less adapted to dry, cold grasslands than the park's Przewalski horses, and until a few years ago the cattle were supplementary fed. The winter of 2011 was the first winter in which additional food was not necessary.

=== Denmark ===
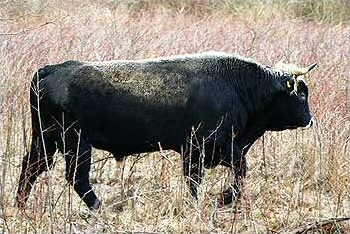
The Taurus bull "Leonardo" (Chianina × Heck) from Lille Vildmose, 2004

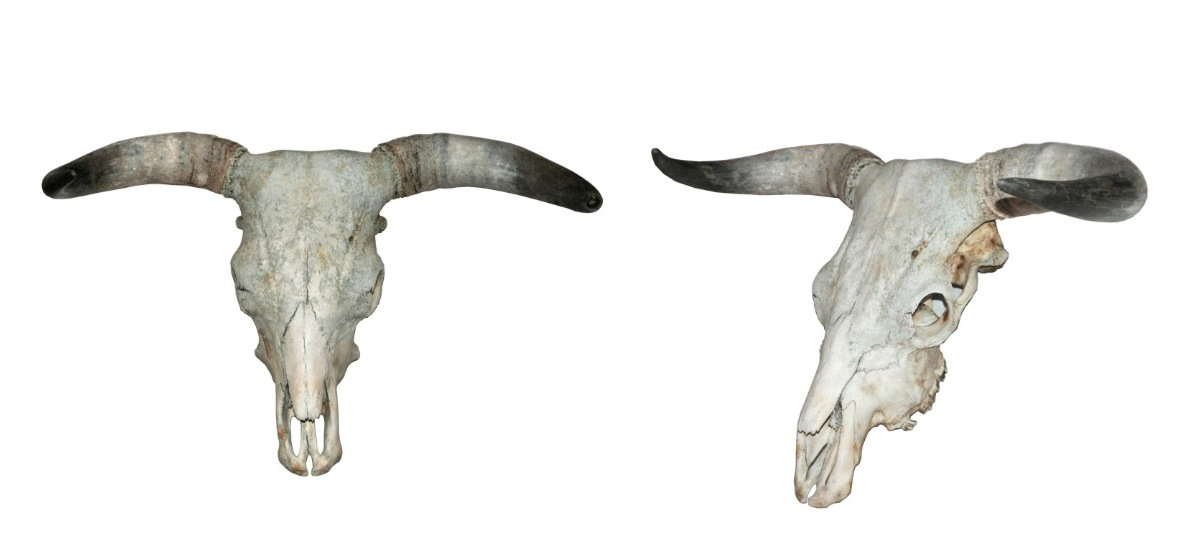
Skull of a Taurus bull

Taurus breeding was initiated in Lille Vildmose Nature Reserve under the name Projekt Urokse ("Project Aurochs"). The founding herd consisted of one Chianina × Heck bull, four Heck cows and one Sayaguesa × Heck cow, and in 2009 three Sayaguesa bulls were added; by 2010 the herd had grown to 56 individuals.

=== Latvia ===
In Latvia, Taurus cattle are being bred by WWF Latvia. In February 2004, besides two German animals 21 head of Dutch Heck cattle were brought to Pape Nature Reserve, in October another 18 head of Dutch Heck cattle followed.

== External features of Taurus cattle ==
Most Taurus cattle are long-legged and comparatively slender. An increase in size was achieved, as large Taurus bulls measure 165 cm at the withers while normal Heck bulls measure only 140 cm. Particularly, the Sayaguesa-influenced animals are long-snouted.

== Gallery ==
Lippeaue (Germany)

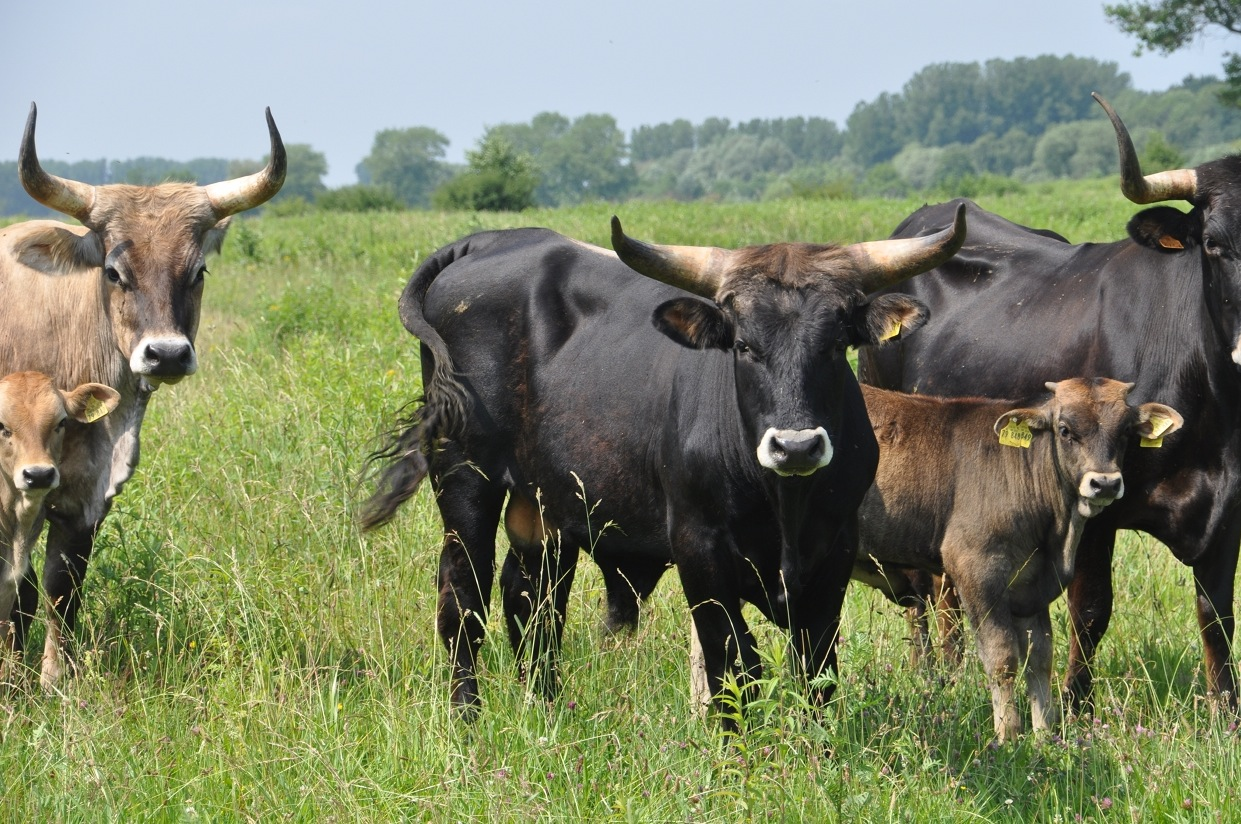
"Londo" (centre): 50% Sayaguesa, 25% Heck, 25% Chianina; son of Lamarck

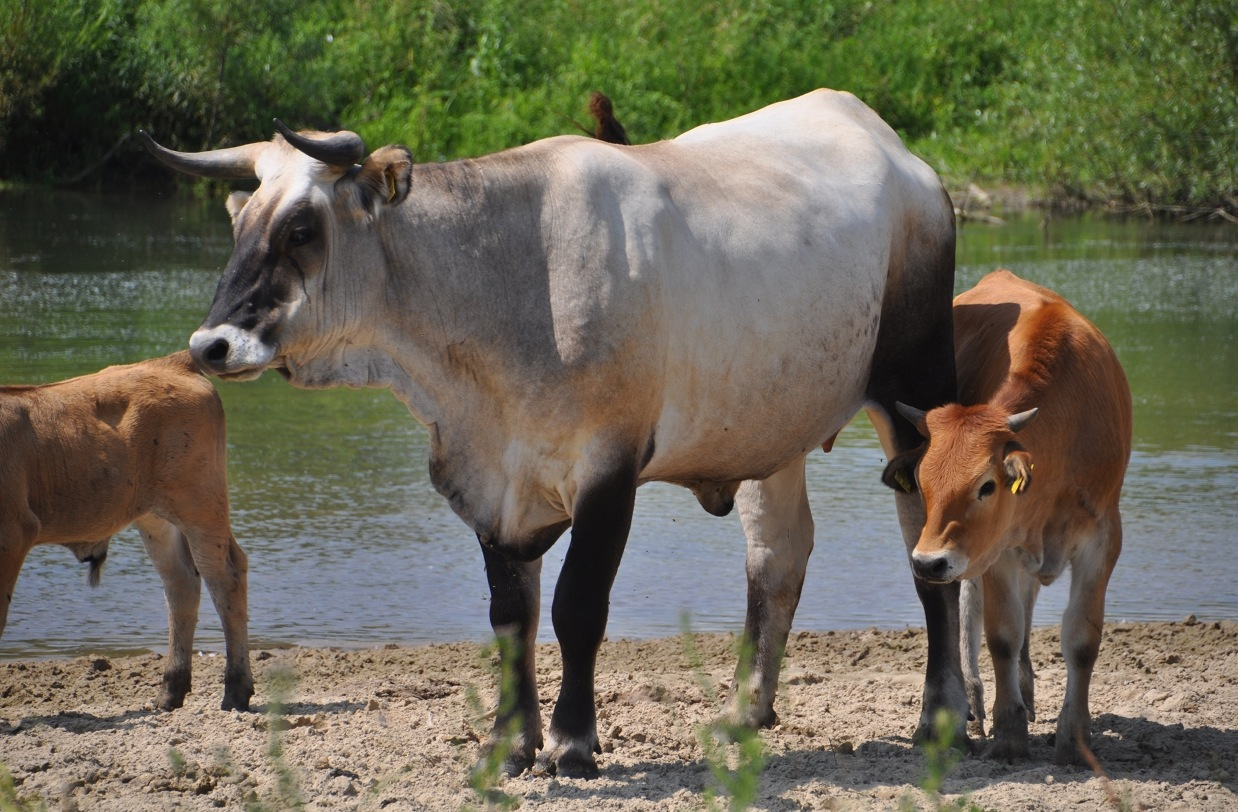
"Larissa": Chianina × (Sayaguesa × (Heck × Chianina))

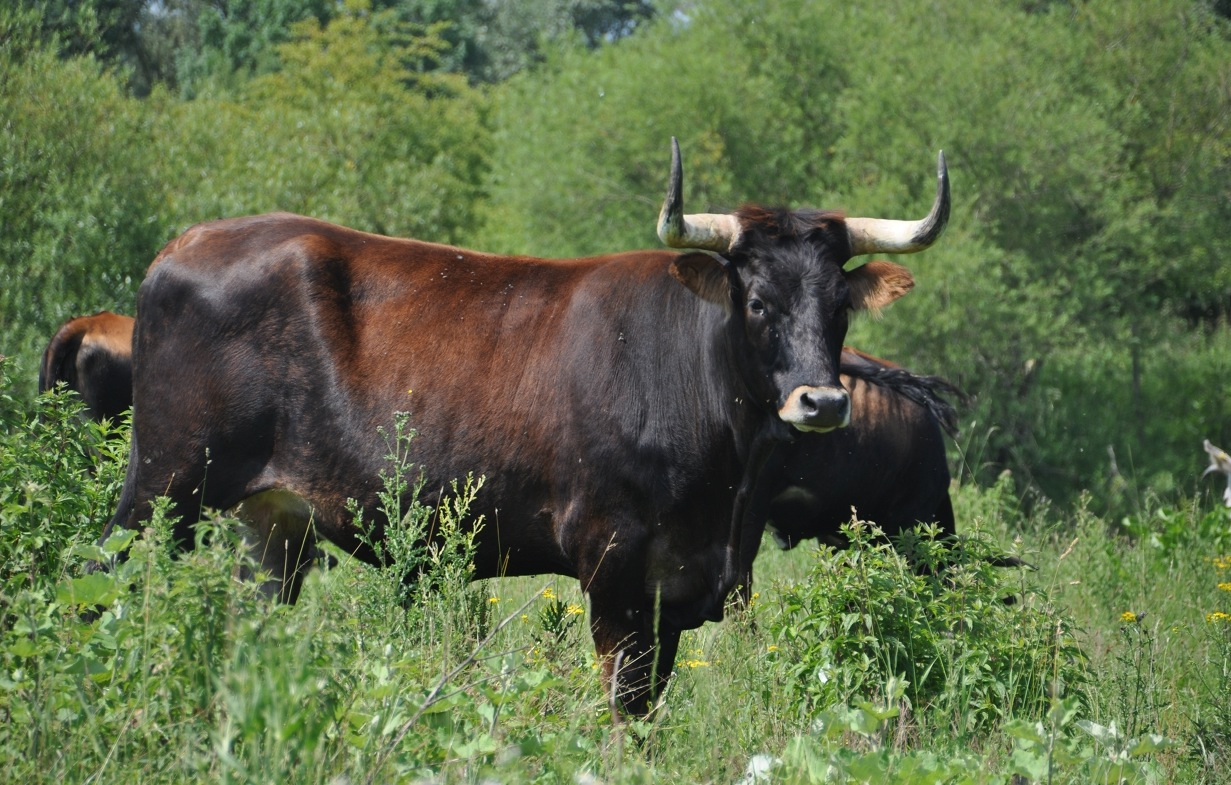

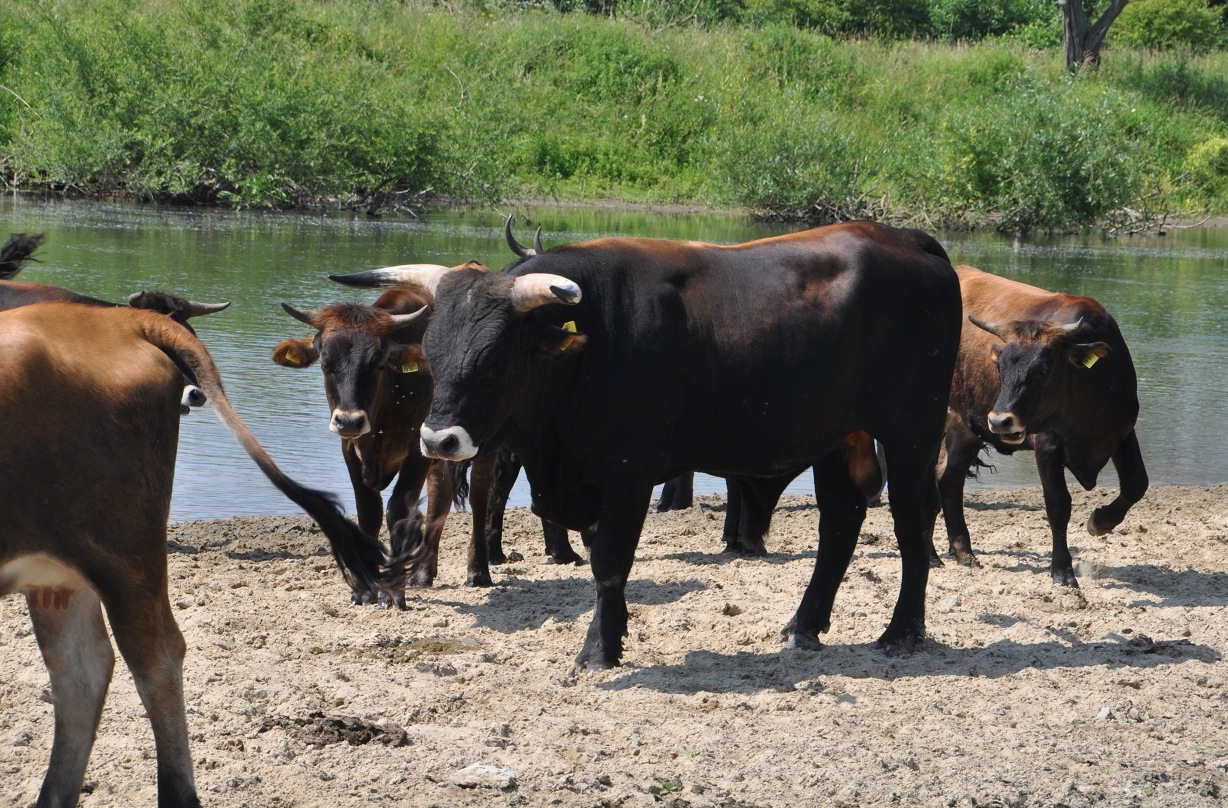

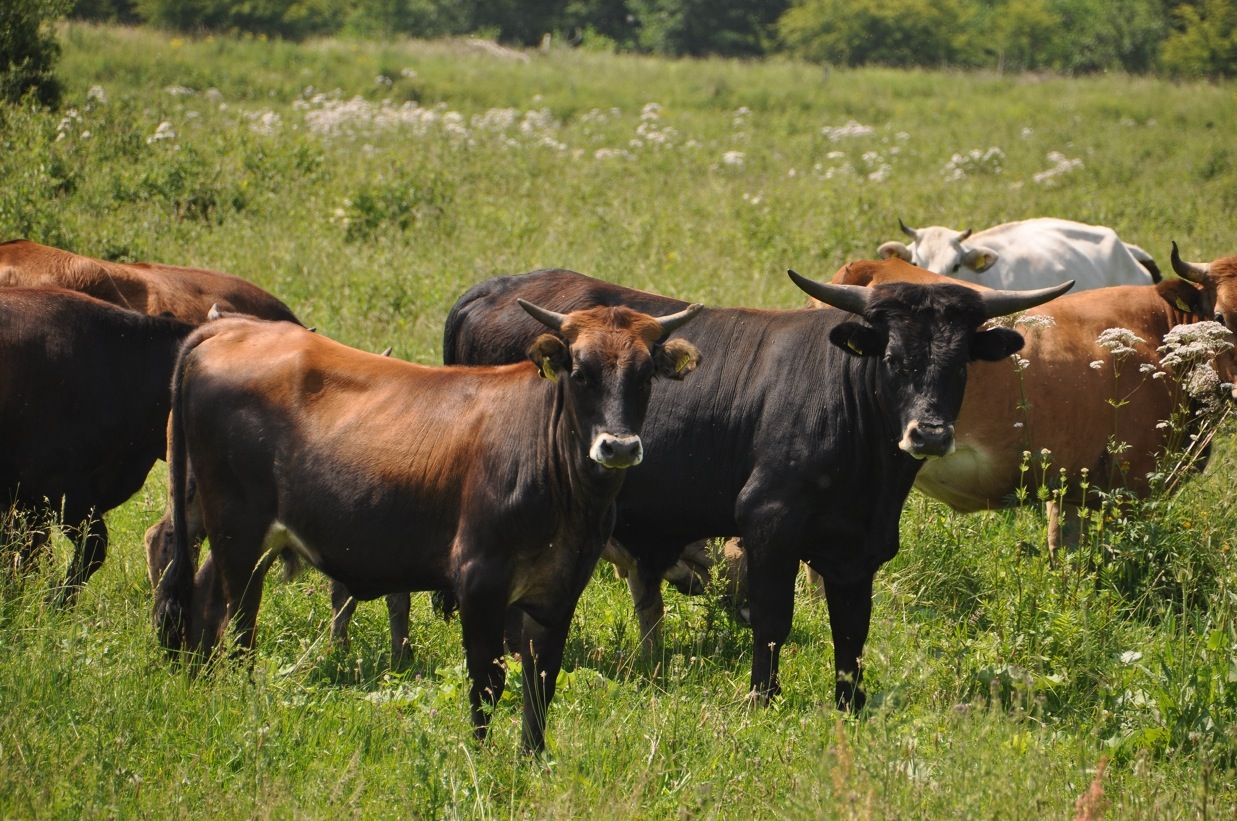

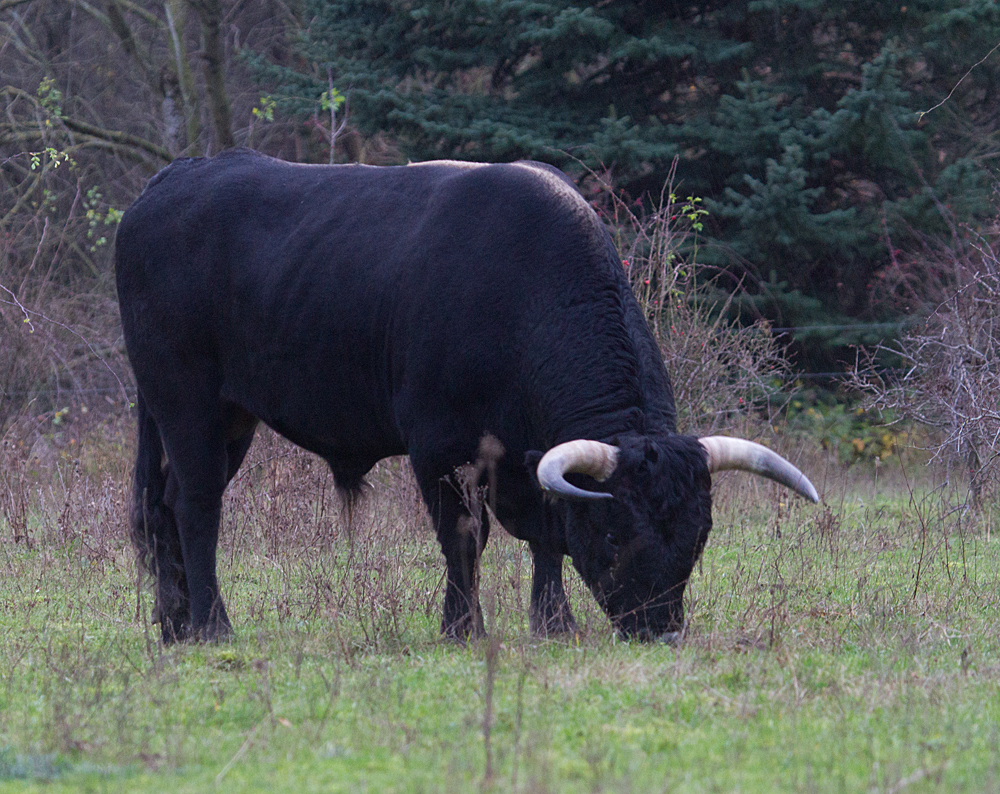
"Latino": 50% Sayaguesa, 25% Fighting cattle, 25% Heck

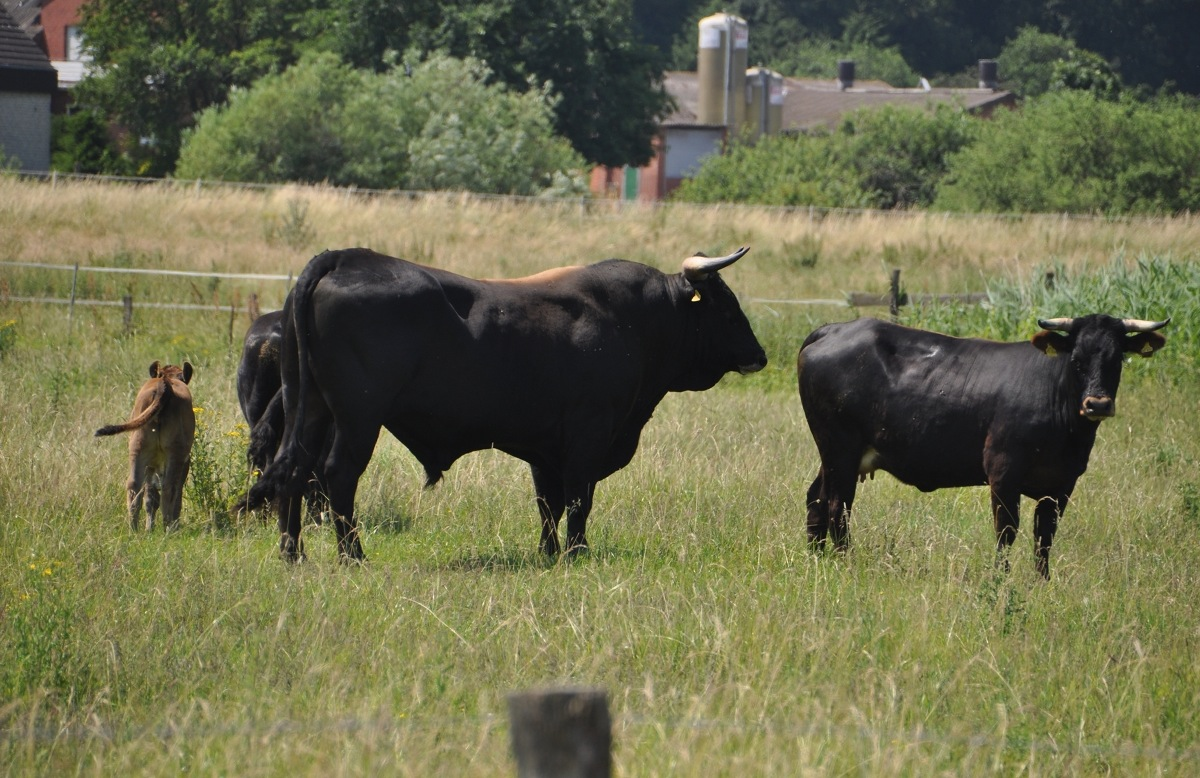
"Larwin" (centre): 50% Sayaguesa, 37,5% Heck, 12,5% Chianina; cow at right: Heck × Sayaguesa

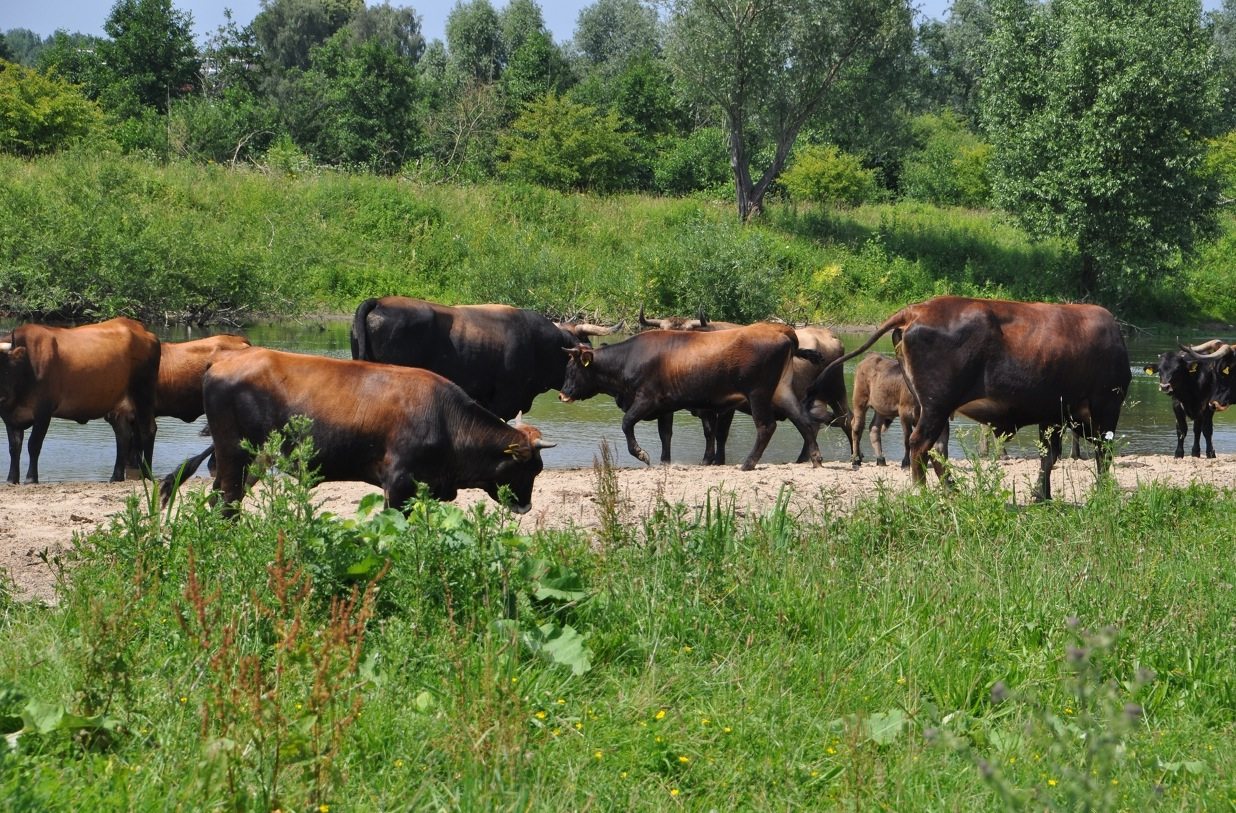

== See also ==
- Tauros Programme
- Uruz Project
