= Grzimek =

Grzimek is a German surname of Polish origin. It may refer to the following people:

- Bernhard Grzimek (1909–1987), German zoologist, author, editor and animal conservationist
  - Grzimek's Animal Life Encyclopedia
- Martin Grzimek (born 1950), German author
- Michael Grzimek (1934–1959), German zoologist, conservationist and filmmaker, son of Bernhard
- Sabina Grzimek (born 1942), German sculptor
- Waldemar Grzimek (1918–1984), German sculptor, father of Sabina
