= 6th Berlin International Film Festival =

1956 film festival in West Berlin, Germany

- Festival poster
- Location: West Berlin, Germany
- Founded: 1951
- Awards: Golden Bear: Invitation to the Dance
- Festival date: 22 June–3 July 1956
- Website: Website

Berlin International Film Festival chronology
- 7th 5th

The 6th annual Berlin International Film Festival was held from 22 June to 3 July 1956. The FIAPF granted the festival the "A status" during this year, which was previously only reserved for Cannes and Venice. The awards for the first time, were given by an international jury.

The Golden Bear was awarded to Invitation to the Dance directed by Gene Kelly. However, this decision by the jury was widely criticized as the film was considered "too shallow" for a Golden Bear. The favourite among many critics was the Finnish entry The Unknown Soldier by Edvin Laine, which was an anti-war film without any illusions based on a novel by Väinö Linna.

== Juries ==
The following people were announced as being on the jury for the festival:

=== Main Competition ===
- Marcel Carné, French filmmaker - Jury President
- Bill Luckwell, British producer
- Giuseppe Vittorio Sampieri, Italian director and producer
- Kashiko Kawakita, Japanese special effects director
- Leo J. Horster, American entrepreneur
- Ilse Urbach, West-German author
- Ludwig Berger, West-German filmmaker

=== Documentary and Short Film Competitions ===
- Otto Sonnenfeld, Israeli producer - Jury President
- D. Gualberto Fernández, Uruguayan
- Sarukkai Gopalan, Indian
- Jan Hulsker, Dutch art historian
- Fritz Kempe, West-German photographer

== Official Sections ==
=== Main Competition ===
The following films were in competition for the Golden Bear awards:

English title	Original title	Director(s)	Production Country
Autumn Leaves		Robert Aldrich	United States
Before Sundown	Vor Sonnenuntergang	Gottfried Reinhardt	West Germany
Donatella		Mario Monicelli	Italy
Invitation to the Dance		Gene Kelly	United States
Kispus		Erik Balling	Denmark
The Legend of the White Serpent	白夫人の妖恋	Shirō Toyoda	Japan
The Long Arm		Charles Frend	United Kingdom
Richard III		Laurence Olivier	United Kingdom
The Road of Life	El camino de la vida	Alfonso Corona Blake	Mexico
Scandal in Sorrento	Pane, amore e...	Dino Risi	Italy
The Sorceress	La Sorcière	André Michel	France, Sweden
Trapeze		Carol Reed	United States
Uncle Hyacynth	Mi tío Jacinto	Ladislao Vajda	Spain, Italy
The Unknown Soldier	Tuntematon sotilas	Edvin Laine	Finland

=== Documentary and Short Film Competitions ===
English title	Original title	Director(s)	Production Country
The African Lion		James Algar	United States
Bambuti	Kein Platz für wilde Tiere	Bernhard Grzimek and Michael Grzimek	West Germany
...erwachsen sein dagegen sehr		Wolf Hart	West Germany
Ernst Reuter		Wolfgang Kiepenheuer	West Germany
Hitit güneşi		Sabahattin Eyüboğlu	Turkey
The Long Journey		Geoffrey Collings	United States
Men Against the Arctic		Winston Hibler	United States
Paris la nuit		Jacques Baratier and Jean Valère	France
Rythmetic		Norman McLaren and Evelyn Lambart	Canada
Le Sabotier du Val de Loire		Jacques Demy	France
Spring Comes to Kashmir		Ravi Prakash	India
Les Très riches heures de l'Afrique romaine		Jean Lehérissey	France
Zauber der Natur		Richard Mostler	West Germany

== Official Awards ==
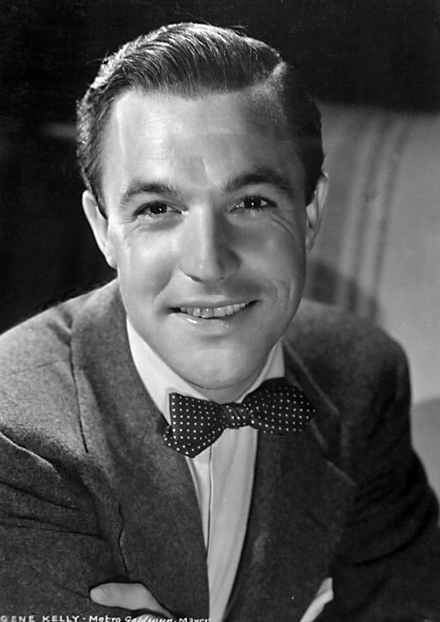
Gene Kelly, winner of the Golden Bear at the event.

The following prizes were awarded by the Jury:

=== Main Competition ===
- Golden Bear: Invitation to the Dance by Gene Kelly
- Silver Bear for Best Director: Robert Aldrich for Autumn Leaves
- Silver Bear for Best Actress: Elsa Martinelli for Donatella
- Silver Bear for Best Actor: Burt Lancaster for Trapeze
- Silver Bear for an Outstanding Artistic Contribution: André Michel for La Sorcière
- Silver Bear for an Outstanding Single Achievement: Charles Frend for The Long Arm
- Silver Bear: Richard III by Laurence Olivier
  - Honourable Mention (Director): The Road of Life by Alfonso Corona Blake
  - Honourable Mention (Colour): The Legend of the White Serpent by Shirō Toyoda
  - Honourable Mention (Best Humorous Film): Scandal in Sorrento by Dino Risi

=== Documentary and Short Film Competitions ===
- Golden Bear (Documentaries): Bambuti by Bernhard Grzimek and Michael Grzimek
- Silver Bear (Documentaries): The African Lion by James Algar
- Short Film Golden Bear: Paris la nuit by Jacques Baratier and Jean Valère
- Silver Bear for Best Short Film:
  - Hitit güneşi by Sabahattin Eyüboğlu
  - Spring Comes to Kashmir by Ravi Prakash
  - Rythmetic by Norman McLaren and Evelyn Lambart
  - Honorable mention (Short Documentary or Cultural Film):
    - ...erwachsen sein dagegen sehr by Wolf Hart
    - Le Sabotier du Val de Loire by Jacques Demy
    - The Long Journey by Geoffrey Collings

== Independent Awards ==
=== OCIC Award ===
- The Unknown Soldier by Edvin Laine
  - Special Mention: The Road of Life by Alfonso Corona Blake

=== Audience Vote ===
- 1st place: Before Sundown by Gottfried Reinhardt
- 2nd place: Uncle Hyacynth by Ladislao Vajda
- 3rd place: Trapeze by Carol Reed
