= Heinroth =

Heinroth is a surname. Notable people with the surname include:

- Johann Christian August Heinroth (1773–1843), German physician
- Klaus Heinroth (born 1944), East German canoeist
- Magdalena Heinroth (1883–1932), German ornithologist, aviculturist, and taxidermist
- Oskar Heinroth (1871–1945), German biologist
