= Bernhard Grzimek =

German zoo director (1909–1987)

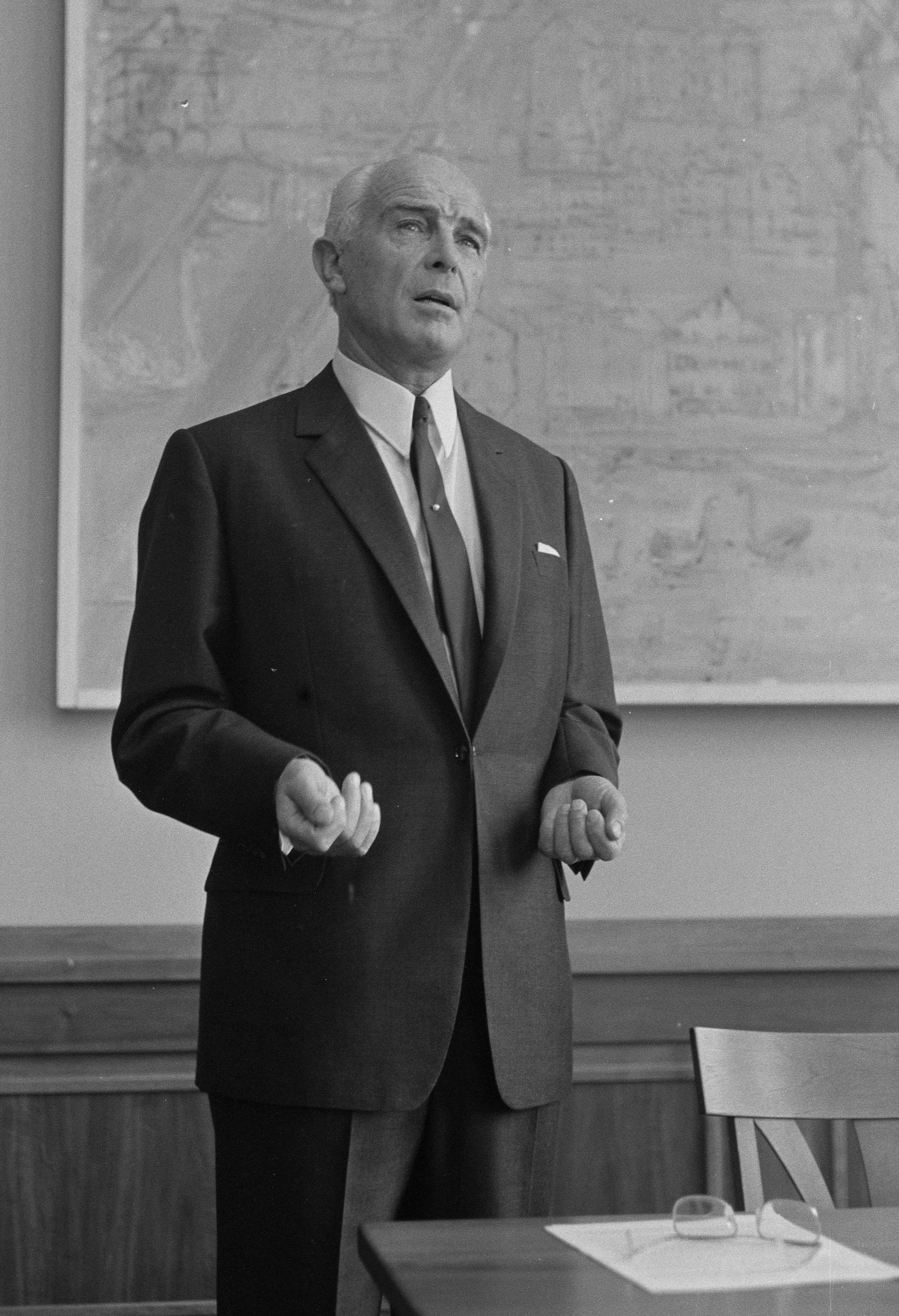
- Grzimek in Zurich, 1967
- Born: Bernhard Klemens Maria Hoffbauer Pius Grzimek; 24 April 1909; Neisse, Prussian Silesia, German Empire
- Died: 13 March 1987 (aged 77); Frankfurt, West Germany
- Occupations: television host, filmmaker, author, zoo director, veterinarian, businessman
- Years active: 1954–1987
- Spouses: Hildegard Prüfer (m. 1930; div. 1973) Erika Grzimek (m. 1978)
- Children: 5, including Michael (1934–1959)

Signature
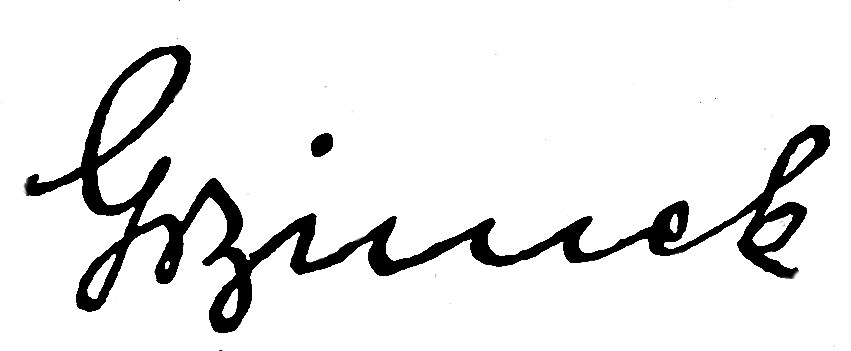

Bernhard Klemens Maria Hoffbauer Pius Grzimek (German pronunciation: [ˈɡʒɪmɛk]; 24 April 1909 – 13 March 1987) was a German zoo director, zoologist, book author, editor, and animal conservationist in postwar West Germany. During the Third Reich, he served as a veterinarian in the army. After World War II, he popularized the study of animals and created an interest in wildlife in Germany, becoming the public face of Frankfurt Zoo, producing a popular German magazine called Das Tier, giving radio talks and appearing on a popular television series Ein Platz für Tiere [A place for animals] in the 1950s and 60s, apart from producing a multi-volume encyclopedia on animals. He wrote another book Kein Platz für wilde Tiere [No Place for Wild Animals] (1954) which was later produced as a documentary dealing with the problems of African wildlife. Along with his son Michael Grzimek he produced a documentary Serengeti Shall Not Die which won an Oscar. He was involved in popularizing African wildlife and in wildlife conservation in Africa, particularly in the Serengeti. He served as a government advisor on conservation and campaigned against the use of animal furs for fashion. He sometimes wrote under the pseudonym "Clemens Hoffbauer".

== Biography ==
=== Early years and education ===
Grzimek was born in Neisse (Nysa), Prussian Silesia. His father Paul Franz Constantin Grzimek was a lawyer, judicial councilor, and civil law notary. Paul Franz had been married in 1888 to Maria née Schmook who died in 1897 at the age of 28. From this first marriage he had a daughter Barbara who moved with her father on his second marriage to Margarete "Margot" (nee Wanke). Bernhard was the fifth born from this second marriage after Brigitte (1902), Franziska (1904), Notker (1905) and Ansgar (1907). The Polish speaking Grzimek family came from Upper Silesia where they were farmers and landowners. His grandfather Joseph had learned brewing and lived at Schwesterwitz. The first in the family to move from the village to the city was Bernhard's father. He had been educated at Breslau, Marburg, and Berlin. Their home in Neisse had maids, a cook and a nanny. His father was politically active, a debater, and a supporter of the Catholic Center Party. He had been offered a position in the Reichstag but had refused it due to a heart condition. He opposed many of Bismarck's policies including the separation of the church and state. His mother was a devout Catholic. The home had an extensive library which Bernhard explored from an early age. His father however died on April 6, 1912 when Bernhard was just three years old. After the death of his father, his mother Margot moved to a large apartment in Ratibor where Bernhard suffered from an episode of scarlet fever. His grandmother Maria helped in the care of the children. Bernhard also spent time in the country on holidays with "aunt" Hedwig, the second wife of his grandfather Joseph, stepmother of his father.

Grzimek initially studied at St. Rochus monastery boarding school. His step-sister Barbara gave some of her share of the family inheritance to support her step-mother and the children. A fascination with animals came early from visits to the circus and with their neighbour's stuffed parrot. In 1915 he went to the Catholic elementary school in Neisse. At the age of eight he took a hedgehog to class and he got the nickname "Igel". The hedgehog would later become his mascot, appearing on his visiting card and other media. He joined an animal breeding association where he took a special interest in Antwerp Bearded Bantams. In 1919, after World War I, Margot and her five children moved to an apartment in Neisse. The inflation until 1923 strained the family finances and Bernhard's older siblings began to take up jobs – Fränze trained as a bookseller and moved to Dresden. Ansgar went to Innsbruck to study law and Notker went to study medicine. Bernhard spent two more years with his mother, travelling around by bicycle and learning to ride a horse. He also contributed articles to the magazine Geflügel-Börse and wrote a pamphlet on breeding bantams. He passed his abitur in 1928, not doing well in mathematics but excelling in German. After studying veterinary medicine from 1928, first at Leipzig and later in Berlin. While studying he also helped his second cousin Günther Grzimek, a member of the Prussian State Parliament, set up a poultry farm on his newly purchased estate in Stäbchen, southeast of Berlin. He often took his cousin's children to Berlin zoo and received free tickets from the zoo director Ludwig Heck. Günther's son Waldemar would later become an animal sculptor of renown and the younger son Günther (jr) became involved in zoo landscaping.

While still a student, he married Hildegard Prüfer from a Protestant family on 17 May 1930. His mother Margot did not attend the wedding which was held in Wittenberg. They would have three sons: Rochus, Michael, and an adopted son, Thomas. Shortly after the wedding Grzimek received an offer to visit the US to study poultry farms on behalf of the Prussian Ministry of Agriculture. He was also supported by Geflügel-Börse and by Spratt's Dog Biscuit Factory. He travelled, sea sick, aboard ship and spent some time in New York. He observed large scale poultry operations and returned in November, breaking journey in France and making a trip to England before taking a train to Paris. He returned back to studies to make up for a lost semester and attended classes by Erwin Stresemann, Ferdinand Sauerbruch and August Bier. He finally received his doctorate in 1933 with a thesis on the arteries of the domestic chicken. He then joined as an expert in the Prussian ministry of agriculture. He also began a small veterinary practice.

Grzimek wrote several small books on poultry keeping and the breeding of chickens. In 1933 there was a ban on dual incomes and he was forced to wind up his veterinary practice. In 1934 he began to write a two page article for the Illustrierte Blatt, a popular illustrated magazine in Germany that was edited by Wilhelm Hollbach. He received 1000 Reichmarks for this writing and he became widely popular. Hollbach even supported Grzimek to have a second servant so that he could have more time to write. He also got Hildegard to write some of the material on his behalf. In 1934 his apartment was searched by the Gestapo which he later claimed was because the egg dealer Max Neumann was part of the SA. In 1936 he joined the German Society for Animal Psychology which included Oskar Heinroth, Otto Koehler, Konrad Lorenz, Jakob von Uexküll, and Lutz Heck. In the early years he did not attend many meetings and the society went dormant as the war progressed. In 1940 he contributed an article on the behavior of a chimpanzee to the journal of the society. He tried to obtain an academic position but he was rejected in 1936. He however published his habilitation findings in a journal. He also wrote a book on poultry diseases which was to be the last of his purely scientific books. It was not until 1960 that he became an honorary professor at Justus Liebig University in Giessen.

Grzimek's mother died in 1936 and following that he gave up the Catholic church and later called himself a "convinced atheist". In 1937 his Aunt Hedwig and his step sister Brigitte died. An inheritance allowed him to buy a new and larger house in Johannisthal, Berlin. Here he would keep many animals at home and write about their behavior. The photographs of many baby animals reared at home in the hands of Hildegard captivated his readers.

In 1936 he moved from the Reich Reichsernährungsministerium (Food Ministry of the 3rd Empire) to the association of egg industry.

=== Personal life ===
Grzimek's marriage was not one of harmony. He had an affair with his secretary which affected Hildegard's health so much that she had to be admitted into a health spa in 1935. This affair continued until the end of World War II and was known to Hildegard throughout. Grzimek, in his autobiography noted that this woman became an actress later and helped him survive in the Nazi era. He had a daughter and a son through this relationship. In 1972 Hildegard fell ill and during this period he moved to Röderbergweg to live with the widow of his son Michael. Grzimek and Hildegard formally divorced in 1977. Hildegard moved to live on the same street In 1978, Bernhard Grzimek married Michael's widow Erika and adopted the two children Stephan Michael (b. 1956), and Christian Bernhard (b. 1959, after Michael's death). His adopted black son Thomas had troubles from a long time. He had been caught with hashish in 1969 by the German police. He had been sent for some time to Uganda and in 1976 he was sent to study hotel management in Switzerland and was arrested for heroin trafficking. Thomas would keep asking Bernhard for money, sometimes threatening to reveal information that would harm the Grzimek reputation. He served a six month sentence in prison during which he attempted suicide. After release he drank everyday and lived in downtown Münster. On August 7, 1980 he jumped off the apartment window and died in hospital. Hildegard died of cancer on May 5, 1984.

=== World War II and aftermath ===
In 1937 Grzimek was trained as part of the Wehrmacht, with six-week training in Lübben after which he was made a non-commissioned officer with the 9th Cavalry Regiment in Fürstenwalde-Spree. Around this time the Gestapo began an investigation in his office. It is thought that Grzimek had allowed a man, a friend of his secretary, named Franz Petrich to make use of the workplace typewriter to write material against Hitler. Grzimek's superiors came to his rescue but he was demoted to a position that oversaw the movement of freezers until he was moved back to the ministry in 1938. He became involved in an effort to manage bovine tuberculosis using isolation and vaccination techniques. In August 1939 he was drafted into the Wehrmacht. As senior veterinary surgeon he was responsible for the horses of the division. His unit had gone deep into Poland. One of his duties was to consolidate reports everyday on wounded and dead horses. At the end of the Poland campaign on October 6, 1939, he was able to get accurate counts of the dead and surviving horses to tally.

Back at home in Berlin film-maker Paul Lieberenz made a film in November 1939 on their chimpanzee Ula - Ulla, das Schimpansenkind. Ula attacked Grzimek who had returned home with a beard and shortly afterwards died of anemia. After this he raised a wolf named Genghis (Dschingis) at home. Grzimek trained the wolf for a role in the film Tiefland along with Leni Riefenstahl. In August 1940 he was released from Wehrmacht duties and he took greater interest in the training of wolves for the film shooting. The wolf Dschingis however died in the course of the filming. Grzimek was then posted in Berlin to conduct psychological evaluations of horses under veterinarian General Kurt Schulze. In 1940 he became the father of a daughter through his lover. The family took up a new home in Kenels.

In 1942 he was sent to the Polish border along with Hans Fellgiebel to examine if horses had an innate sense of direction and could return home on their own. Grzimek found that the horses were lost in unknown territory, something that Fellgiebel thought was very obvious. Schulze was disappointed by the results and he sent Grzimek to Munich to Circus Krone to study elephants and their memory for places. Again Grzimek found negative results.

He was asked to give lectures on animal psychology at the Hanover veterinary school. This finally happened in summer 1943. Shortly after that he was sent again on war duty to Riga. A ricocheting Soviet bullet hit him and he was briefly to hospital. In November 1943 he was sent back to Berlin which was under regular aerial bombing. With much of the zoo damaged, the director Lutz Heck gave Grzimek the duty of caring for the chimpanzees Ova and Bambo and the orangutan Muschi at their home in Johannisthal. In June 1944 the family moved to Kenels. Towards the end of the war Grzimek was given orders to march to the Polish front but his unit had left and he knew that if he was discovered in Berlin he would be shot. He hid in the home of his lover along with their daughter. A driver for an SS officer took them in a stolen truck to East Westphalia. In Detmold, where the Americans had taken control, he changed into civilian clothes and gave himself up to the authorities. He then found a bicycle and went to Frankfurt where he took the help of Wilhelm Hollbach, who had been appointed as mayor by the Americans. Hollbach took Grzimek as an assistant.

Grzimek's involvement in the politics of the period is complicated and unclear. In a Berlin University document signed by Grzimek on April 22, 1936, he gave a statement that he had been in the Sturmabteilung, Motorsturm 2 / M28 and that he had been a member of the NSDAP (the Nazi Party, member number 2552) from 1933 to 1935. However these were statements made by him and no official documents corroborate this. In a biography by Claudia Sewig, the fact that he obtained a motor license only in 1952 makes the claim about his "Motorsturm" strange. In November 1947, Grzimek was questioned about his membership in the NSDAP by the U.S. military government, and here he denied it. He was then removed from office in the Frankfurt Zoo, fined, and sent for denazification. On 23 March 1948, it was determined that he was innocent (Category 5; Exonerated). He was then reinstated at the Zoo by the U.S. government but his reputation was compromised as there was a NSDAP entry as a candidate (admitted on May 1, 1937 - number 5,919,786) but not as a member; following a 1949 lawsuit Grzimek was given a fine. According to Eugeniusz Nowak, Grzimek had tried to join the party out of fear, to save himself.

=== Zoo director ===
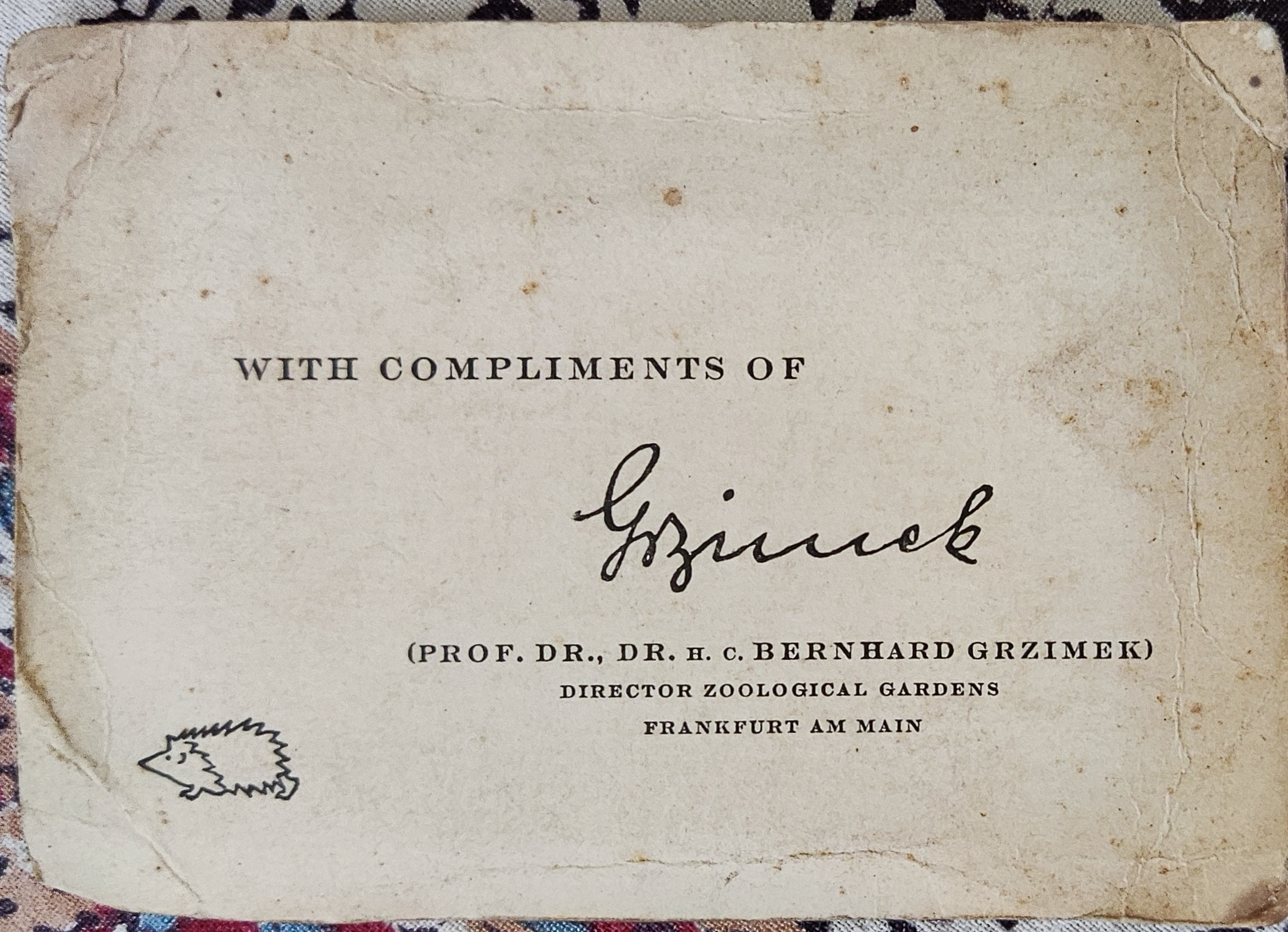
Visiting card with the "Igel" (hedgehog) icon

Grzimek was appointed director of the Frankfurt Zoological Garden on 1 May 1945 by Hollbach. The previous zoo director Georg Steinbacher was thought to have died but when he returned he was denied his former position. Steinbacher was dismissed from service on June 2, 1945 for having been a member of the Nazi party. In 1947 Steinbacher took up a position in Augsburg zoo with support from Munich Zoo director Heinz Heck but held a grudge against Grzimek. With the zoo then in ruins and all but 20 animals killed, he prevented the permanent closure of the Frankfurt Zoo and the relocation of the "Center Zoo" to the outskirts. In June 1945 the rest of the family moves from Kenels to Frankfurt. The Zoo reopened on 1 July 1945, after all bomb craters had been filled and buildings temporarily restored. The posters declaring that the zoo had been opened were drawn by Martha Bertina who had illustrated earlier for the Illustrierte Blatt. There were no cinemas or other entertainment. So with festivals, film shows, dances and actors, Grzimek attracted the Frankfurt population, while receiving the assent of the Provisional Government and the U.S. military to continue the Zoo. Animals were acquired from all quarters including circus animals from Friedel Krone. Animal exchanges with Heck however ran into trouble as he felt cheated. The zoo attendance improved and 80000 visitors came in the first half of the year and 1.1 million in the second half. Walter Kolb became the mayor in August 1946 and he received a letter from Heck claiming that Grzimek had no qualification as a zoologist. Katharina Heinroth and others supported Grzimek and Kolb took no action. Oskar Hoppe wanted to have the circus inside the zoo and Grzimek opposed it. In November 1947 he was questioned by American authorities about his Nazi part membership. Around the same time many animals at the zoo died and were found to have been poisoned with sodium fluoride. In 1948 Kolb was forced to dismiss Grzimek on account of the information on his Nazi past.

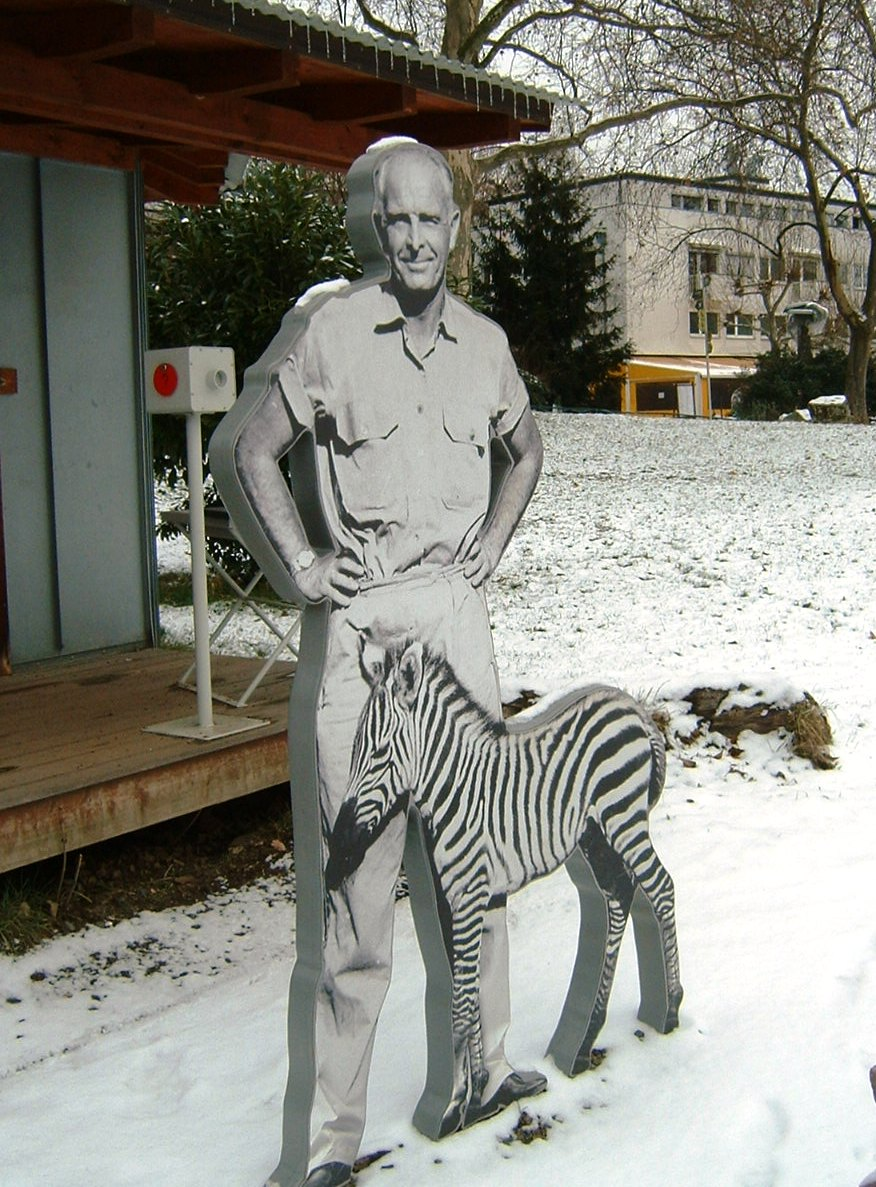
Grzimek cutout at the Frankfurt Zoo

At Grzimek's denazification trial, Otto Koehler, gave a positive testimonial for saving Karl von Frisch from dismissal. The driver who helped Grzimek escape from Berlin testified that Grzimek hid Jews and provided them with food. Wilhelm Holbach testified that Grzimek had refused to write for the media organized by the Nazi party. The denazification committee exonerated him for lack of evidence. It was among the last trials of the Spruchkammer in Germany.

Oskar Hoppe in the meantime claimed that Grzimek had made irregular sales and made money from the zoo. Grzimek filed a complaint against Hoppe. On April 7, 1948, Hildegard and Bernhard Grzimek were arrested and taken for questioning. Hildegard was released after two days but interrogation of Bernhard continued. There was also an accusation that coal had been purloined from the zoo for personal use. The trial ended on August 10, 1948 and they were acquitted due to lack of evidence and proof of innocence. Kolb moved to reinstate Grzimek on August 14.

On April 1, 1949, Grzimek played a prank, something that he enjoyed in his life. He claimed that a white elephant which was in transit across Europe would be on display at the zoo. The press report included an elephant that had been painted white.

In 1950, Grzimek attended the International Association of Zoo Directors meeting in London, one of three from Germany along with Karl Max Schneider and Katharina Heinroth. He also founded a Society of Friends of the Zoological Garden. A society had existed in the past from 1858 and in 1958 this got renamed as the "Zoological Society of Frankfurt am Main". He made use of the society to promote a lottery and 1.7 million tickets were sold and 480,000 marks was earned. Now the zoo could make many decisions without interference from the city officials.

He continued to lead the Zoo for 29 years, until his retirement on 30 April 1974. He made it into one of the largest zoological gardens in Germany.

=== Wildlife conservation and other activities ===
In 1951 Grzimek and his son Michael made their first trip to Africa. Although there was no intention to collect any animals for the zoo, he received three chimpanzees from private sellers. Word spread and other animals were offered and they took back a number of them with the sixteen-year-old Michael taking them aboard a steamer to Hamburg. When Michael reached Hamburg he was quite sick and needed to be hospitalized. In 1952 he visited South America. He visited Rancho Grande and in 1953 he revisited and stayed with Ernst Schäfer. He was asked by the Venezuelan government for advice on setting up a zoo in Caracas.

In 1954 he founded the stock photography agency Okapia, which specializes in science, animals and nature. It was later managed by Michael and his wife Erika. Still later it was managed by Christian Bernhard Grzimek, Bernhard's grandson.

Grzimek is significant for the conservation work he undertook in the Serengeti. The Grzimek's considered the relocation of the Masai herders as essential for their idea of preserving the wildlife. He spent several years studying its wildlife there alongside his son Michael, especially on observation and counts of large scale annual migrations. The documentary film Serengeti Shall Not Die was written and directed by Bernard and Michael Grzimek with footage shot by Alan Root (who replaced the German photographer Richard Graf who Grzimek had initially hired) and Hermann Gimbel. It won the Academy Award for Documentary Feature in 1959.

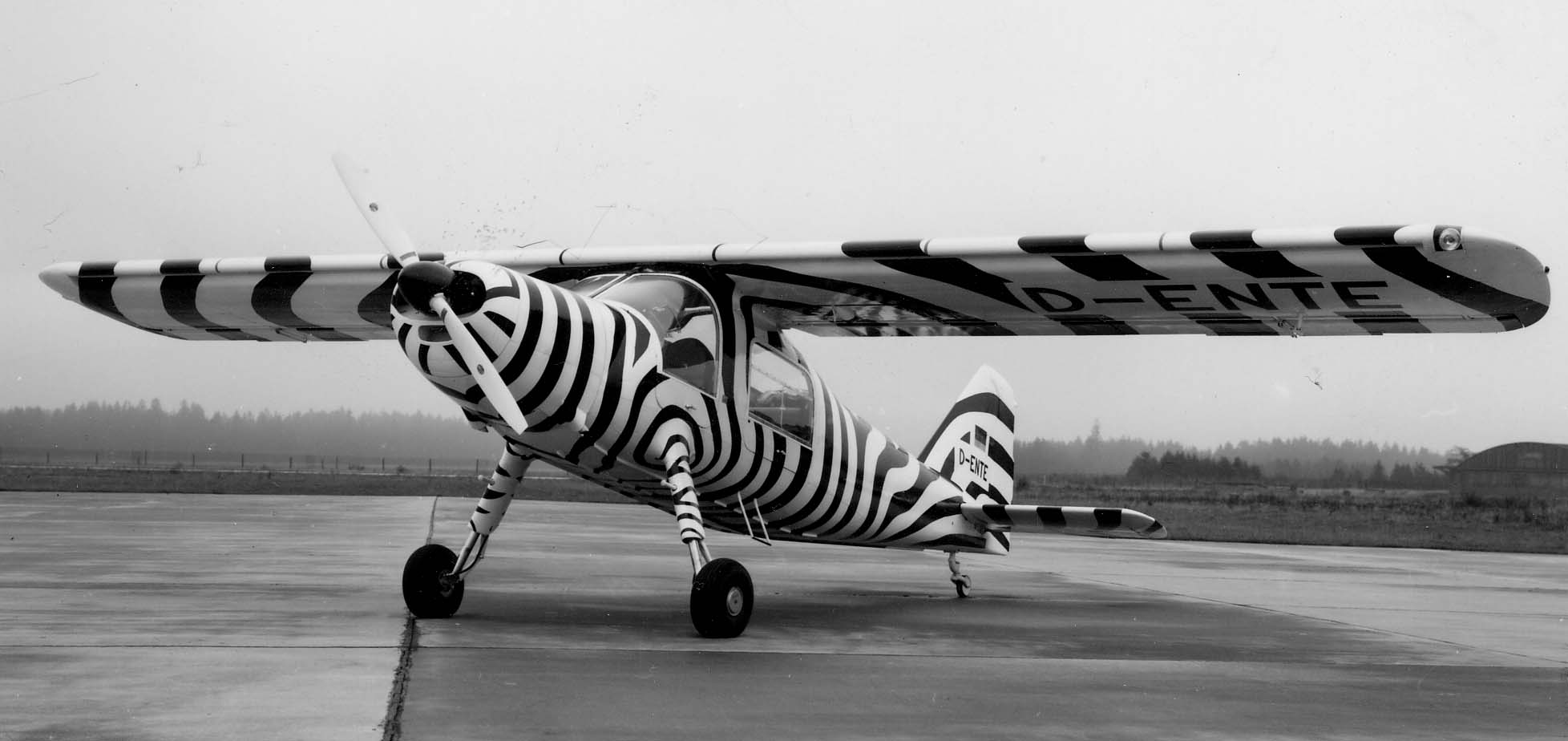
The Zebra-patterned Do 27B-2 used by Bernhard and his son Michael.

On January 10, 1959, Michael was killed in an air crash over Ngorongoro crater while flying the Dornier Do 27 (registered as D-ENTE) possibly due to a collision with a Rüppell's griffon vulture. Grzimek wrote a best-selling book, Serengeti Shall Not Die, which first appeared in German in 1959 and later in 20 other languages. Its popularity was key in driving the creation of the Serengeti National Park. In the book he prophesied:

Large cities continue to proliferate. In the coming decades and centuries, men will not travel to view marvels of engineering, but they will leave the dusty towns in order to behold the last places on earth where God’s creatures are peacefully living. Countries which have preserved such places will be envied by other nations and visited by streams of tourists. There is a difference between wild animals living a natural life and famous buildings. Palaces can be rebuilt if they are destroyed in wartime, but once the wild animals of the Serengeti are exterminated no power on earth can bring them back.

In 1961 he created a demand for German tourists by suggesting on his TV show that a three-week trip package should be possible for 2100 Deutsche Marks to visit the Serengeti on safaris. This led many tour operators to begin such packages and he used the potential of tourism incomes to force African leaders to heed his advice.

Grzimek began a campaign against the use of furs in fashion in 1965. He wrote an open letter about the use of a leopard coat by the Italian actress Gina Lollobrigida and this was widely reprinted. He received support from the wife of the German president Wilhelmine Lübke who agreed not to use fur coats. He also began a campaign against the killing of harp seal pups in Canada. He made a donation of $5,000 to the New Brunswick Society for the Prevention of Cruelty to Animals. He showed footage on the killing of skins which led to outrage and the creation of legislation in Canada to protect harp seals.

In 1969 Willy Brandt appointed him as Nature Conservation Commissioner.

Grzimek opposed the use of battery cages for chickens and later campaigned for free range chicken. Years earlier, it had actually been Grzimek who had prescribed the use of wire cages for keeping chickens, claiming that coccidosis was avoided as the droppings fell through the cage. In later times antibiotics made coccidosis manageable without cages.

In 1975 he co-founded the League for the Environment and Nature Conservation (BUND) and bought ten acres of forest and wetlands in the Steiger forest near Michelau im Steigerwald which he left wild.

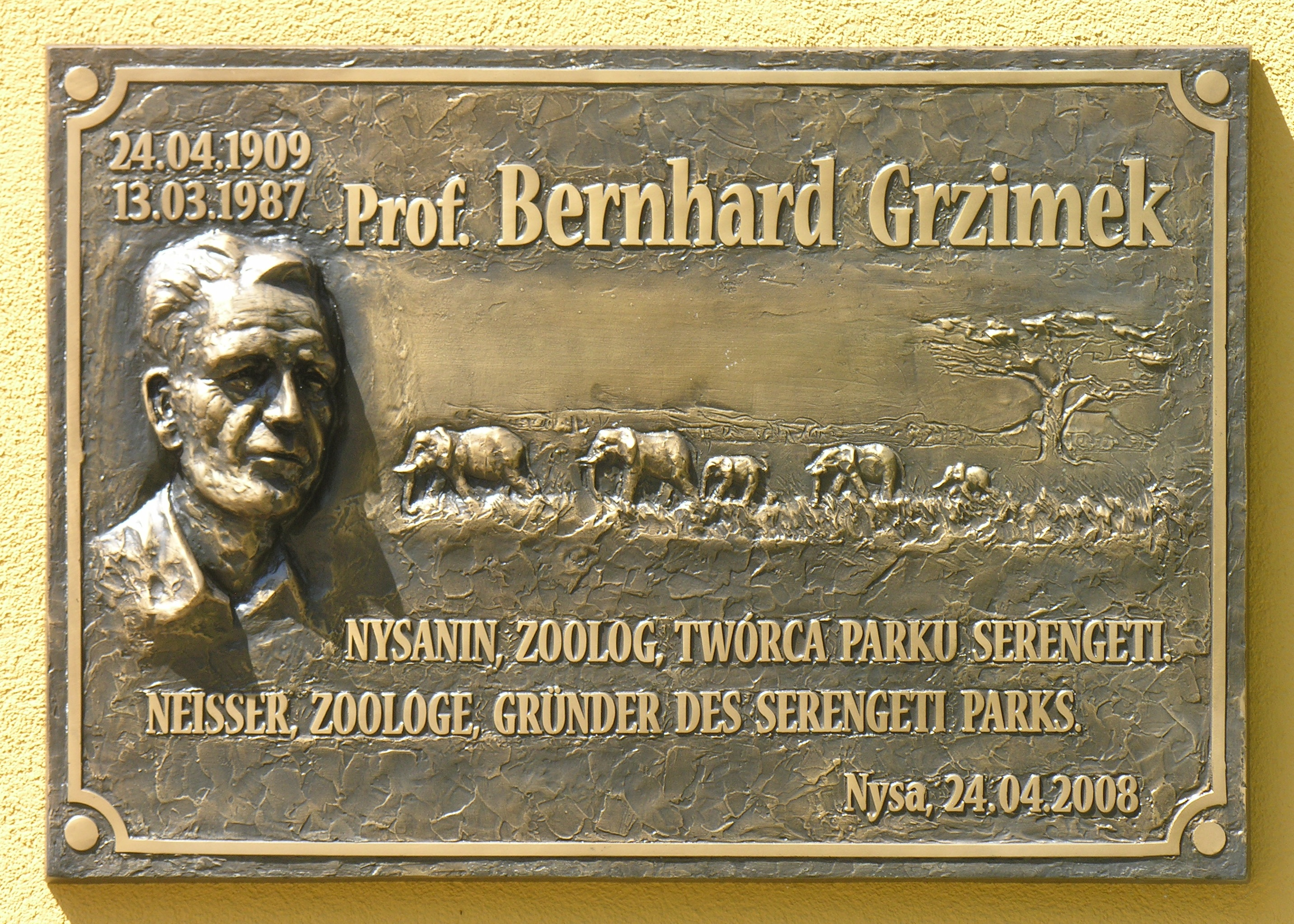
The plaque for Bernhard Grzimek in Nysa

=== Death ===
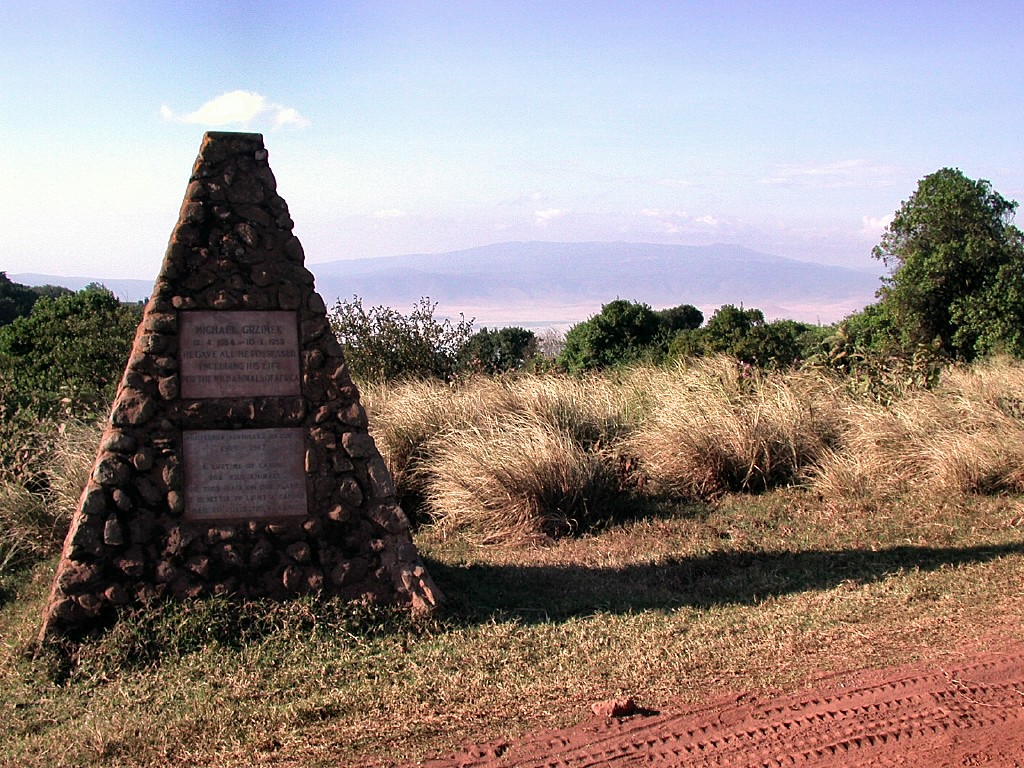
Grave of Michael and memorial for Bernhard Grzimek at the edge of the Ngorongoro Crater, Tanzania

Grzimek died in Frankfurt am Main in 1987 while watching the Williams-Althoff Circus. He wanted to photograph the Siberian tigers for which Rainer Westphal, the press officer for the circus tried to get him a seat in the box. While the tigers were performing, Grzimek slumped and could not be revived. He was cremated and his ashes were later transferred to Tanzania and buried next to his son Michael at the Ngorongoro Crater. He had originally wished that after his death, his body would be laid out on the African plains to be eaten by scavengers.

Following his death there was a fourteen-year long dispute over his inheritance involving the grandchildren he adopted as his sons and his son Rochus. It had been estimated by the press that he had assets of 27 million marks. The case was closed after the family settled matters in private.

== Publications ==
Grzimek was the editor-in-chief of (and author of a number of articles in) Grzimek's Animal Life Encyclopedia, a massive and monumental encyclopedia of animal life. After publication in Germany in 1968, the encyclopedia was translated into English and published in 1975 in 13 volumes (covering lower life forms, insects and other invertebrates, fish, amphibia, reptiles, birds and mammals) plus three additional volumes on Ecology, Ethology and Evolution. The 1975 work was issued in both hardback and less expensive paperback editions and became a standard reference work. After Grzimek's death, the volumes on mammals were revised, and republished in both German and then in English. In 2004, the entire encyclopedia was revised and published in a new and expanded edition with Michael Hutchins as the new editor in chief. All the versions of the encyclopedia are marked by clear and forceful prose, extensive use of illustrations (both drawings and color plates), and a deep love and concern for animal conservation.

Of national importance were his work as co-editor (together with Austrian Nobel-prize winner Konrad Lorenz) of the then-largest popular magazine on animals and wildlife in German language, Das Tier (German for "The Animal") and of a very popular television series on wildlife. He also authored a large number of popular books based on his countless experiences with animals which he raised since his student days, managed as zoo director, and encountered in the wild during many research trips.

== Awards and honors ==
- 1956: 2 Golden Bears for Kein Platz für wilde Tiere in the categories International Documentary and Audience Award
- 1956: German Film Award for Kein Platz für wilde Tiere
- 1959: Golden Screen for the television program Ein Platz für Tiere
- 1960: Academy Award (Oscar) for Serengeti darf nicht sterben in the category Documentary
- 1960: Honorary Professor at the Veterinary Faculty Justus-Liebig-Universität Gießen
- 1960: Honorary doctorate from Humboldt University of Berlin, "Dr. med. vet. h. c."
- 1960: Honorary Member of the Scientific Society of Veterinary Medicine of the GDR (WGV)
- 1963: Gold Medal from New York Zoological Society for "outstanding services in conservation of nature“
- 1964: Wilhelm Bölsche-Medal for services to the dissemination of science in Germany
- 1968: Tie Man of the Year
- 1969: Grand Federal Cross of Merit
- 1969: Goldene Kamera
- 1973: Bambi award from Bild und Funk magazine
- 1978: Inauguration of the new nocturnal animal house in the Frankfurt Zoo under the name Grzimek-House
- 1981: Honorary Professor of Lomonosov University
- 2008: Renaming of a portion of the Frankfurt street Am Tiergarten in Bernhard-Grzimek-Allee

== Works ==
=== Films ===
- 1956 - Kein Platz für wilde Tiere (in German)
- 1959 - Serengeti shall not die (Original German title: Serengeti darf nicht sterben) (in German)
- 1956 - 1980 - Ein Platz für Tiere (German TV series) (in German)

=== Books ===
- 1941 - Wir Tiere sind ja gar nicht so! Franckh'sche Verlagshandlung (in German)
- 1943 - Wolf Dschingis: Neue Erlebnisse, Erkenntnisse und Versuche mit Tieren, Franckh'sche Verlagshandlung (in German)
- 1951 - Affen im Haus und andere Tierberichte, Franckh'sche Verlagshandlung (in German)
- 1952 - Flug ins Schimpansenland: Reise durch ein Stück Afrika von heute, Franckh'sche Verlagshandlung (in German)
- 1956 - 20 Tiere und ein Mensch (in German)
- 1956 - Thulo aus Frankfurt - Rund um die Giraffe, Franckh'sche Verlagshandlung (in German)
- 1959 - Serengeti darf nicht sterben (über die Arbeit am Film) (in German)
- 1960 - Kein Platz für wilde Tiere (in German)
- 1961 - Unsere Brüder mit den Krallen (in German)
- 1963 - Wir lebten mit den Baule. Flug ins Schimpansenland (in German)
- 1965 - Wildes Tier, weißer Mann (in German)
- 1968 - Grzimeks Tierleben, 16 vol. (in German)
- 1969 - Grzimek unter Afrikas Tieren: Erlebnisse, Beobachtungen, Forschungsergebnisse (in German)
- 1974 - Auf den Mensch gekommen: Erfahrungen mit Leuten (in German)
- 1974 - Vom Grizzlybär zur Brillenschlange: Ein Naturschützer berichtet aus vier Erdteilen, Kindler (in German)
- 1974 - Einsatz für Afrika: Neue Erlebnisse mit Wildtieren, Kindler (in German)
- 1974 - Tiere, mein Leben: Erlebnisse und Forschungen aus fünf Jahrzehnten, Harnack (in German)
- 1975 - Grzimek's Animal Life Encyclopedia, 13 vol., Van Nostrand Reinhold Company, New York [translation of 1968 work]
- 1977 - Und immer wieder Pferde. Kindler (in German)
- 1988 - Grzimeks Enzyklopädie der Säugetiere, Kindler Verlag, München.
- 1990 - Grzimek's Encyclopedia of Mammals, 5 vol., McGraw-Hill, New York, ISBN 0-07-909508-9 [translation of 1988 work]
- 2004 - Grzimek's Animal Life Encyclopedia, 2nd. Ed., 17 vol., Thomson-Gale, Detroit, ISBN 0-7876-5362-4 [revision of 1975 work]

=== Magazines ===
- since 1960 - Das Tier (joint editor with Konrad Lorenz und Dr. Heini Hediger) (in German)

== Film ==
In 2004 and 2008 public German TV broadcast 2 documentaries on Grzimek, and in 2015 an almost 3 hour long biopic featuring Ulrich Tukur as Bernhard Grzimek.

=== Documentaries ===
- Thomas Weidenbach: Bernhard Grzimek – Ein Leben für die Tiere. ZDF 2004; ca. 54 Minuten
- Erika Kimmel, Bernd Isecke: Legenden – Bernhard Grzimek. ARD 2008; 45 Minuten

=== Biopic ===
- Roland Suso Richter: Grzimek. ARD 2015; 165 Minuten. Mit Ulrich Tukur als Hauptdarsteller.
