= Katharina Heinroth =

German ornithologist and zoologist

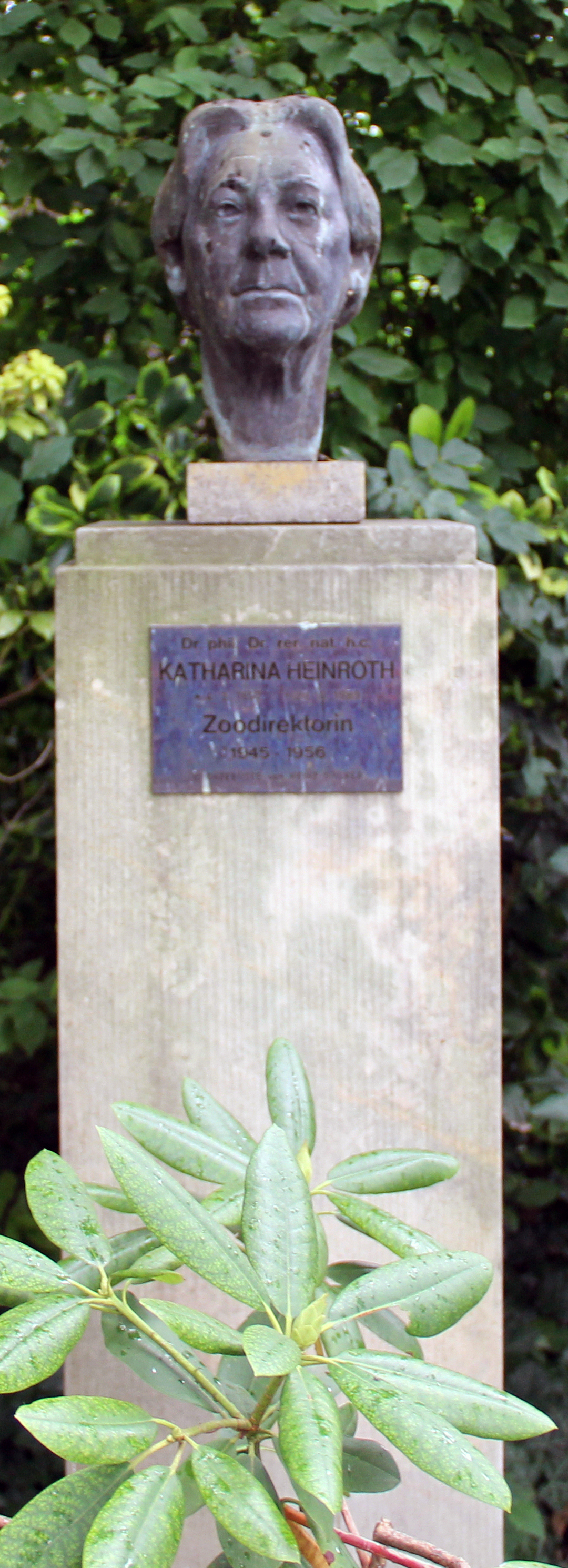
Bust in the Berlin zoological garden

Katharina Bertha Charlotte Heinroth née Berger, (4 February 1897 – 20 October 1989) was a German zoologist and director of the Berlin Zoo, succeeding her husband Oskar Heinroth, from 1945 to 1956. She was born in Breslau and died in Berlin.

== Life and work ==
Katharina Berger was born among four siblings in Breslau. As a child she grew up in the village of Wohwitz west of Breslau where she kept frogs and other animals at home, observing the growth of butterflies. She later noted that this was significant in deciding her future interests and career. She went to the secondary lyceum in Breslau followed by studies in zoology, botany and geology at Munich. She graduated in 1923 summa cum laude with work on hearing in reptiles under Otto Köhler. She moved to Munich in 1925 where she lived with Gustav Adolf Rösch, an assistant to Karl von Frisch. She too worked with Frisch on bees in Breslau. She married Rösch in 1928 but they divorced a few years later. She then moved to Halle and worked at the Leopoldina Academy library. She then moved to Berlin where she married Oskar Heinroth in 1933. When he died in 1945 and with the escape of the earlier Nazi director, Lutz Heck (whose father Ludwig Heck had also worked in the Berlin zoo), she was given charge as scientific director of the Berlin zoo and helped restore it from the damage of war. Of the 4000 animals in the zoo, only 91 remained at the end of the war. She earned the nickname of "Katharina die Einzige" ("the one and only Katharina"). She specialized in animal behaviour and was especially skilled in raising birds. From 1953, she also lectured on zoology at Technische Universität Berlin.

She travelled widely on work that involved adding animals to the zoo. She raised private donations for acquiring new animals from around the world. On a trip to Uganda, she noted that African marabous did not fly on approach by humans, due to the protection given to them. Along with Oskar they made studies on pigeon behaviour and navigation. A major work on the birds of central Europe, Mitteleuropäische Vögel (1962) was written by Katharina Heinroth along with J. Steinbacher with art by Franz Murr. Apart from numerous scientific and popular writings, she also wrote a biography of Oskar in 1971 and an autobiography in 1979. She retired as director of Berlin zoo in 1956 and was succeeded by Heinz-Georg Klös.

== Honors and tributes ==
In 1989, Katharina Heinroth received the Urania-Medal conferred by Urania (Berlin). The elementary school "Katharina-Heinroth-Grundschule" ("Katharina Heinroth Elementary School") in Berlin was named after her in 2000.

Every year, the Berlin Society of Friends of Natural Science awards students from Berlin's universities with the "Katharina-Heinroth-Preis" ("Katharina-Heinroth Award"). The award is conferred for outstanding bachelor's and master's theses or independent research projects in the field of the life sciences. Recipients of this honor receive €300 alongside a two-year membership in the society.
