= Bambuti (film) =

- Directed by: Bernhard Grzimek; Michael Grzimek
- Written by: Bernhard Grzimek; Heinz Kuntze-Just
- Starring: See below
- Cinematography: Hermann Gimbel; Michael Grzimek; Herbert Lander
- Edited by: Klaus Dudenhöfer
- Music by: Wolfgang Zeller
- Release date: 1956
- Running time: 79 minutes
- Country: West Germany
- Language: German

Bambuti (originally Kein Platz für wilde Tiere) is a 1956 West German film directed by Bernhard Grzimek and Michael Grzimek.

Known as No Place for Wild Animals in the US, the film documents the need for nature reserves in Africa.

== Plot ==
The film casts a critical light on the ever-advancing destruction of the African natural and animal world through the constantly growing and expanding human civilization as well as through poaching. Various animal species, mainly around Lake Edward, are shown, while the indigenous people living in the rainforest, the "Bambuti" (a pygmy people), are also presented.

== Background ==
The film is only very loosely based on the book of the same name that was published in 1954 or has little in common with it, apart from the warning core message. The latter is primarily about how Bernhard Grzimek goes in search of new animals for the Frankfurt Zoo in the Belgian Congo, catches some and transports them to Frankfurt, including an okapi, which was the first in Germany. Michael wanted to film his father's book in color and so the two traveled back to Africa to film in northeastern Congo, Sudan, Uganda, Kenya and Tanganyika.

In order for Michael to be able to complete the film, a loan of 100,000 DM had to be taken out and the state film guarantee office only guaranteed half of the total costs of the film. Many film professionals who saw the documentary before it was officially released complained that the animals were shown "too peacefully" there, as they were used to scenes with predators on the prowl or other animal species attacking people from previous African films, for example. A Munich film distributor also initially rejected the production.

In 1956, Walt Disney had also produced a documentary film (Secrets of the Steppe) about the wildlife of Africa, which was to run parallel to Grzimek's film in cinemas and was also represented at the 1956 Berlin International Film Festival. On the last day of the Berlinale, No Space for Wild Animals was shown in a cinema on Kurfürstendamm. Bernhard and Michael Grzimek had invited the press to the Berlin Zoological Garden for the morning of that day, but no journalists showed up. Finally, at the premiere, the audience began to applaud mid-film, during a scene in which three giraffes parade against the evening sky. Grzimek's production was a surprising success, with both the jury and the audience choosing it over the Disney offering. No Place For Wild Animals was shown in 63 countries worldwide, and it stayed in the program of a Munich cinema for twelve weeks. The South African censors initially wanted to shorten the documentary, but after protests in the newspapers, the interior minister decided that the film would be shown there uncensored.

Bernhard and Michael Grzimek offered part of their film proceeds to the English administration of Tanganyika, which was supposed to use it to buy up land to enlarge the conservation areas there, since the British government had decided to reduce the Serengeti National Park by a third. This offer was declined, instead the Grzimeks were invited by the National Park's director, Peter Molloy, who had previously worked in what is now South Sudan, to study animal migrations in the Serengeti. Michael and Bernhard Grzimek's second cinema documentary, Serengeti Shall Not Die, was the result of this research trip.

As with the following film, Wolfgang Zeller was responsible for the film music for No Space for Wild Animals, which was recorded by the German Film Orchestra under the direction of Eberhard Soblick. The animation recordings at the beginning of the film came from the Bremen studio H. Koch.

== Cast ==
- Viktor de Kowa as Narrator (voice)
- Carleton Young as Narrator (voice: English version)
