= Sabina Grzimek =

German sculptor

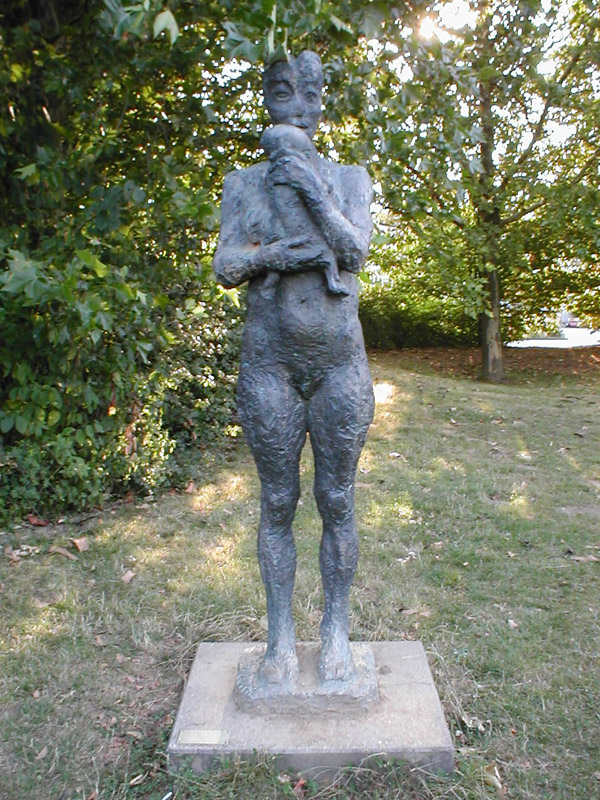
Mother and Child, bronze, 1981. Heilbronn

Sabina Grzimek (born 12 November 1942 in Rome; also spelled Sabine) is a German sculptor. She is the daughter of sculptor Waldemar Grzimek.
