= Ludwig Heck =

German zoologist (1860–1951)

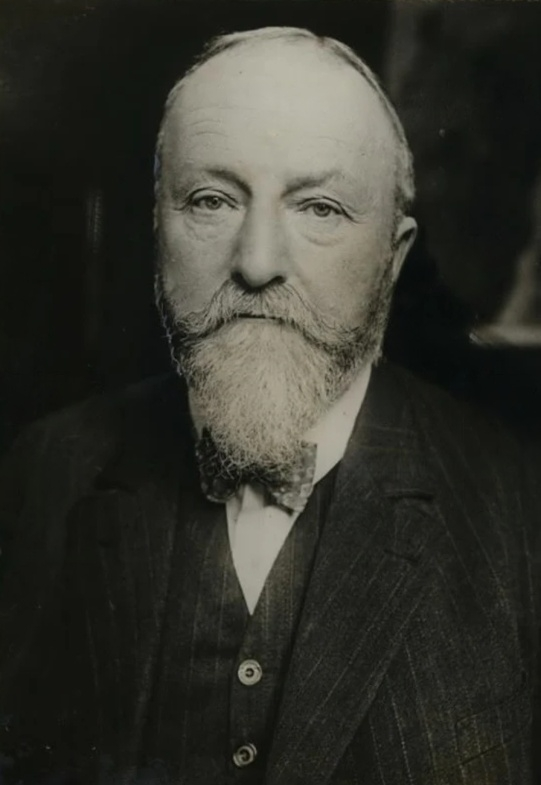
Ludwig Heck in 1928

Ludwig Franz Friedrich Georg Heck (11 August 1860 – 17 July 1951) was a German zoologist who served as the director of Berlin Zoo from 1888 to 1931. He was the father of the zoologists Lutz and Heinz Heck. Heck was a national socialist and on his 80th birthday he was personally awarded the Goethe Medal for Art and Science by Adolf Hitler. Heck contributed to a revision of Brehm's Tierleben and a species of monkey, Heck's macaque and a subspecies of the long-tailed finch Poephila acuticauda hecki are named after him.

== Life and work ==
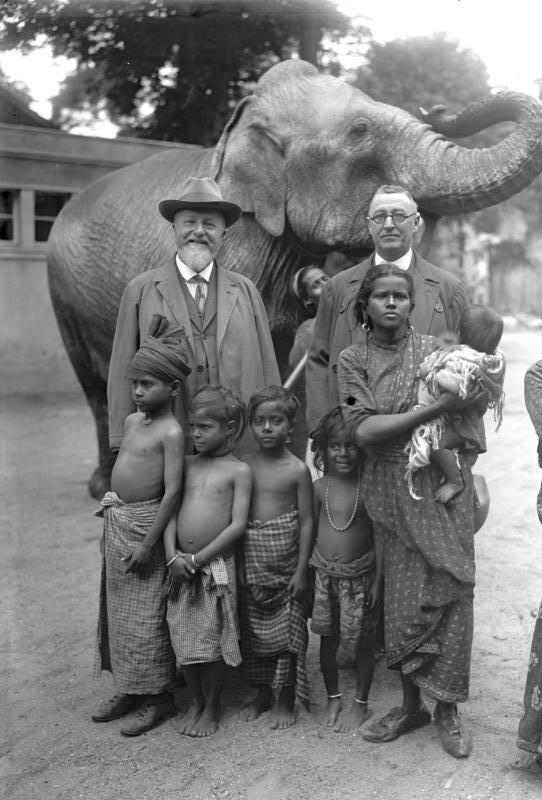
Ludwig Heck (back left) with John Hagenbeck (back right), Asian woman, children and an elephant. (c. 1931)

Heck was born in Darmstadt to Georg Heck, a teacher. He studied at the gymnasium at Darmstadt before going to the University of Strasbourg in 1878 followed by summer in the technical school at Darmstadt. Following his father's wishes he studied also at the Hessian State University, Giessen and then moved to Berlin in 1880. He then went to Leipzig where he completed his doctoral studies under the parasitologist Rudolf Leuckart. He received a doctorate in 1885-86 and obtained the position of director at Cologne Zoo from 1886. In the short time that he spent there, he improved the state of the zoo and earned a reputation. In 1888 he became the director of the Berlin Zoo succeeding Maximilian Schmidt (1885–1888) who died suddenly. Heck would serve until 1931, raising funds for the survival of the zoo through many trying times. The zoo had 924 species of birds and mammals at the end of 1890 and by 1914 it had 3500 animals of 1500 species. Through his connections with colonial German officers he obtained numerous animals, often wild caught, including, for example, a forest elephant. Heck took a special interest in the mental well-being of apes. Heck was extremely popular and wrote numerous articles. He wrote pamphlets for children in which he referred to himself as "Papa Heck". He maintained ties to many of the zoologists and scientists of the period including Hermann Klaatsch, Alfred Nehring, Bernhard Altum, Otto Kleinschmidt, Wilhelm Bölsche and his own colleagues Oskar Heinroth and Max Hilzheimer. He was succeeded as director of Berlin zoo by his son Lutz Heck. Heck was during his time as director of the Berlin zoo responsible for its survival although he resisted moving to the Carl Hagenbeck model of avoiding cages and using moats.

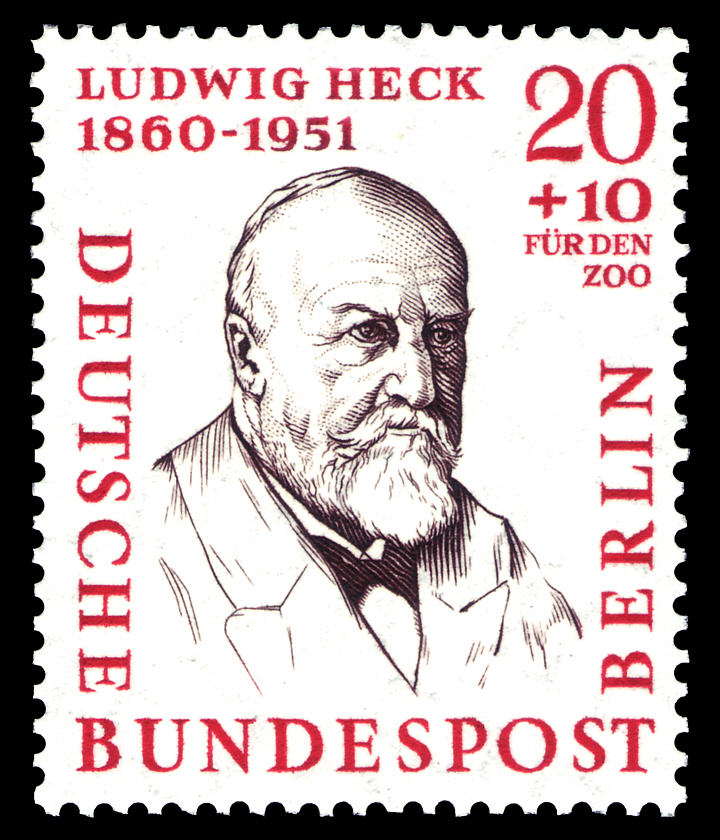
1957 stamp commemorating Heck

== Personal life ==
Heck married Margarete Nauwerk from Cologne and they had two daughters and their sons Lutz and Heinz. Heck was a friend of many powerful politicians. In a 1938 article on man and nature he wrote about "our upheaval and then rebirth, our exceptional Führer and his hardly less exceptional assistants have lifted a real weight from my shoulders, in that they have organized our state— the first in the world!— on the basis of the natural sciences, on the basis of blood and soil” and he noted further that his sons looked upon him as a "National Socialist" even before the word had been invented. His son Lutz, was a member of the National Socialist party and hunting friend of Hermann Göring. A bust was made of him at the Berlin zoo in 1954 and unveiled by Katharina Heinroth despite threats from anti-Nazi protesters. He was a member of the Leopoldina Academy from 1895. His wife died in 1950 and he died in Munich on July 17, 1951, which would have been their 63rd wedding anniversary.

Heck contributed to the fourth edition of the mammals volume of Brehm's Tierleben (1911).
