= Autumn Leaves (film) =

1956 film by Robert Aldrich

- Original theatrical poster
- Directed by: Robert Aldrich
- Written by: Jean Rouverol; Lewis Meltzer; Robert Blees
- Produced by: William Goetz
- Starring: Joan Crawford; Vera Miles; Lorne Greene; Ruth Donnelly; Cliff Robertson
- Cinematography: Charles Lang
- Edited by: Michael Luciano
- Music by: Hans J. Salter
- Production company: William Goetz Productions
- Distributed by: Columbia Pictures
- Release date: August 1, 1956 (New York City)
- Running time: 106 minutes
- Country: United States
- Language: English
- Budget: $765,000
- Box office: $1.1 million (US); 11,216 admissions (France)

Autumn Leaves is a 1956 American psychological drama film directed by Robert Aldrich and starring Joan Crawford in an older woman/younger man tale of mental illness. The film was distributed by Columbia Pictures. The screenplay was written by Jean Rouverol and Hugo Butler, though it was credited to Jack Jevne (serving as a front), since Rouverol and Butler were blacklisted at the time of the film's release.

The film was produced by William Goetz. Aldrich won the Silver Bear for Best Director at the 1956 Berlin International Film Festival.

== Plot ==
Millicent "Milly" Wetherby works at home as a self-employed typist. One evening in a diner, she meets a lonely, younger U.S. Army veteran named Burt Hanson. They share a romantic date at the beach, kissing amidst the crashing waves, but Milly tells Burt to date someone his own age. A month later, Burt is waiting for the still-lonely Milly at her home and the two celebrate his new job at a department store. He proposes to her in a movie theater, and while she initially rejects the proposal, she reconsiders when she sees him walking away.

The next day, the couple gets married in Mexico. However, on the marriage license, he lists his place of birth as Chicago, though he had earlier told her he was born in Racine, Wisconsin. Once home, Burt's ex-wife, Virginia, appears, which shocks Milly because Burt told her that he had never been married. Virginia gives her a property settlement that she wants Burt to sign and tells her that Burt is a habitual liar about his life and his past. Milly also learns that Burt's father is in Los Angeles to find him.

Burt is haunted by the day when he discovered his wife and father making love; he begins displaying signs of mental instability with their sudden, unwelcomed presence in his life. When he becomes violent, Milly sends him to a mental hospital. Burt's condition improves with treatment (depicted sketchily as a montage of intravenous drugs and electroconvulsive therapy), and he severs connections with his past. Milly happily discovers he still loves her and they look forward to a brighter future.

== Cast ==
- Joan Crawford as Millicent Wetherby
- Cliff Robertson as Burt Hanson
- Vera Miles as Virginia Hanson
- Lorne Greene as Mr. Hanson
- Ruth Donnelly as Liz Eckhart
- Sheppard Strudwick as Dr. Malcolm Couzzens
- Selmer Jackson as Mr. Wetherby
- Maxine Cooper as Nurse Evans
- Marjorie Bennett as Waitress
- Frank Gerstle as Mr. Ramsey
- Leonard Mudie as Colonel Hillyer
- Maurice Manson as Mr. Masterson
- Bob Hopkins as Desk Clerk

== Production ==
The film's original working title was The Way We Are. Robert Aldrich originally developed it for his own company, the Associates and Aldrich and it was announced in July 1954, based on an original script by Jack Jevne.

Aldrich got Joan Crawford attached and they sold it to William Goetz who had a deal with Columbia. Filming began on August 31, 1955. It was the second film for Cliff Robertson who had been signed to a long term contract by Columbia after his debut in Picnic.

== Song ==
The title was changed from The Way We Are to capitalize on the success of the then popular tune "Autumn Leaves", performed in the film by Nat King Cole. Crawford's character is fond of the song, but it is not identified by name in the script. Cole's rendition is used over the film's main title sequence and the cast credits at the end.

The song's original title is "Les feuilles mortes" ("The Dead Leaves") with music by Joseph Kosma and lyrics by Jacques Prévert. English lyrics were written by the American songwriter Johnny Mercer (1949). The song was introduced by Yves Montand in the French feature film Les Portes de la Nuit (1946), but was made popular in the United States through a piano version by Roger Williams in 1955.

== Reception ==
Although Bosley Crowther panned the film in The New York Times on August 2, 1956, calling it a "dismal tale", Lawrence Quirk in Motion Picture Herald and William Zinsser in the New York Herald Tribune commented favorably upon the film. Autumn Leaves was a modest box-office success.

Joan Crawford thought highly of the film, deeming it the "best older woman/younger man movie ever made", and added, "Everything clicked on Autumn Leaves. The cast was perfect, the script was good, and I think Bob [Aldrich] handled everything well. I really think Cliff did a stupendous job; another actor might have been spitting out his lines and chewing the scenery, but he avoided that trap. I think the movie on a whole was a lot better than some of the romantic movies I did in the past...but somehow it just never became better known. It was eclipsed by What Ever Happened to Baby Jane? with Bette Davis."

The film has grown in stature among Aldrich fans since its 1956 premiere and is now regarded as one of the director's best films. Dan Callahan of Slant Magazine (June 16, 2004) wrote, "All of Aldrich's early work is intriguing, but Autumn Leaves is his secret gem. It's been passed over as camp because of its star, Joan Crawford, but Aldrich brings all his hard edges to this woman's picture. The collision of his tough style with the soapy material makes for a film that never loses its queasy tension."

Filmink called it "one of those “I married an abusive husband but it wasn’t his fault he hit me” movies, which probably inspired countless women to stay in toxic relationships, but for all that quite an entertaining film."

Crawford and Aldrich announced plans to make another film together, Storm in the Sun but these plans faltered when Aldrich had a falling out with Columbia. However the two later worked together again on Whatever Happened to Baby Jane?. Aldrich and Robertson later made Too Late the Hero (1970) together.

== Awards ==
- Silver Bear for Best Director (Aldrich), Berlin International Film Festival 1956.

== See also ==
- Mental illness in films
- List of American films of 1956
