= Das Tier =

Das Tier – Grzimeks und Sielmanns internationale Zeitschrift für Tier, Mensch und Natur
- Editor: Bernhard Grzimek, Heinz Sielmann
- Frequency: monthly
- Circulation: 60,000
- Founder: Bernhard Grzimek
- Founded: 1960
- Final issue: 2000
- Country: West Germany
- Based in: Switzerland
- Language: German
- ISSN: 0040-7291

Das Tier was a German monthly illustrated magazine on animals which was published from 1960 to 2000. The magazine had been founded by Bernhard Grzimek, Heini Hediger and Konrad Lorenz. In 1981 it merged with Sielmanns Tierwelt produced by Heinz Sielmann from 1977 and the magazine carried the subtitle of "Grzimeks und Sielmanns internationale Zeitschrift für Tier" and Sielmann joined the editorial team. Karl von Frisch and Wolf Herre also joined the editorial team later. It had an initial circulation of 60000 and was published by Hallwag of Bern, the first issue going out on October 1, 1960. It was later acquired by Egmont Ehapa in 1998. In 2000, the magazine was merged into the magazine Natur+Kosmos. Early issues had only some of the 54 pages in colour but later issues were in full colour. They were initially planned to be sold at 2 Deutche Mark per issue but Grzimek considered it too expensive. He also found that German publishers expected any magazine to be priced at around 60 pfennigs and had no expectation of money from advertising. The articles in the magazine included scientific and popular entries often authored by well known people from around the world including WWF director Claude Martin and carried photographs by numerous contributors including Hans Dionys Dossenbach and Willi Dolder. It had a classified advertisements column. After the death of Bernhard Grzimek in 1987 the editorial team included Harald Schliemann.
