= Ethology (journal) =

Peer-reviewed journal

- Discipline: Ethology
- Language: English
- Edited by: Wolfgang Goymann

Publication details
- History: 1937–present
- Publisher: John Wiley & Sons
- Frequency: Monthly
- Open access: Yes
- Impact factor: 1.897 (2020)

Standard abbreviations
- ISO 4: Ethology

Indexing
- ISSN: 0179-1613 (print); 1439-0310 (web)

Links
- Journal homepage; Online access

Ethology is a monthly peer-reviewed scientific journal published by John Wiley & Sons. The journal is associated with the Ethologische Gesellschaft and the current editor-in-chief is Wolfgang Goymann (Max Planck Institute for Biological Intelligence). Previous editors-in-chief were Wolfgang Wickler, Michael Taborsky, and Jutta Schneider with Susan Foster.

== History ==
The Deutsche Gesellschaft für Tierpsychologie (i.e. German Society for Animal Psychology) founded the journal in 1937 as one of the first journals in the world focusing on animal behaviour. Konrad Lorenz, Otto Köhler and Carl Kronacher were the first editors of this journal, which was first named Zeitschrift für Tierpsychologie (i.e. Journal of Comparative Ethology). In 1986, the journal was renamed "Ethology" with the subtitle International Journal of Behavioral Biology. In 2021, Ethology was the first behavioural journal to adopt the STRANGE framework, similar to the WEIRD framework in Psychology, to account for sampling bias. In the same year, it became mandatory for authors to deposit the original data in a public data repository.

== Scope ==
The journal covers all of Tinbergen's four questions, including ultimate (current utility, evolution) and proximate (mechanisms, ontogeny) aspects of Behavioural Biology. Apart from regular Research Articles, it features Perspectives & Reviews, Species-in-the-Spotlight articles, Behavioural Notes, Commentaries and articles focusing on Ethological Methods.

== Abstracting and indexing ==
The journal is abstracted and indexed, for instance, in Academic Search, Scopus, and the Science Citation Index. According to the Journal Citation Reports, the journal has a 2020 impact factor of 1.897, ranking it 46th out of 53 journals in the category "Behavioral Sciences" and 62nd out of 175 in the category "Zoology".
