= The African Lion =

- Directed by: James Algar
- Written by: James Algar; Winston Hibler
- Produced by: Walt Disney; Ben Sharpsteen
- Narrated by: Winston Hibler
- Cinematography: Alfred Milotte; Elma Milotte
- Edited by: Norman R. Palmer
- Music by: Paul J. Smith
- Production company: Walt Disney Productions
- Distributed by: Buena Vista Distribution
- Release date: September 14, 1955
- Running time: 75 minutes
- Country: United States
- Language: English
- Box office: $2.1 million (US)

The African Lion is a 1955 American documentary film directed by James Algar. It was released by Walt Disney Productions as part of its True-Life Adventures series. The film, which was shot over a 30-month period in Kenya, Tanganyika and Uganda (as well as South Africa), focuses on the life of the lion within the complexity of the African ecosystem. At the 6th Berlin International Film Festival it won the Silver Bear (Documentaries) award.

It was released on DVD in 2006 as part of the Walt Disney Legacy Collection. It can be found on the third volume of the True-Life Adventures series where it has been fully restored.

== Reception ==
Bosley Crowther of The New York Times wrote that "we're fairly certain that no visitor to the famous high plateaus of Kenya and Tanganyika, where the excellent color footage of this picture was exposed, ever succeeds in seeing as much of the local wild life or getting as close to it as one does in this handsome film ... A commendable job of direction and editing has been done by James Algar, and an excellent score of music has been provided by Paul Smith". Variety stated that "the Milottes have gotten some of the best wildlife footage ever to come out of Africa ... but spectacular as it is, it's not enough to compensate for the 'I've seen this before' feeling the subject matter engenders". Philip K. Scheuer of the Los Angeles Times wrote: "Much of it is startling stuff", who also noted that the narration "is fairly free of the cloying cuteness typical of earlier True-Life Adventures. To be sure, many of the effects are contrived, for laughter or thrill, in the editing and scoring — but this, after all, is the function of the filmmaker and legitimate enough". The Monthly Film Bulletin wrote: "The consistently brilliant and absorbing photographic methods employed here succeed in infusing new life into what is relatively familiar material".

== See also ==
- List of American films of 1955
