= Lutz Heck =

German zoologist (1892–1983)

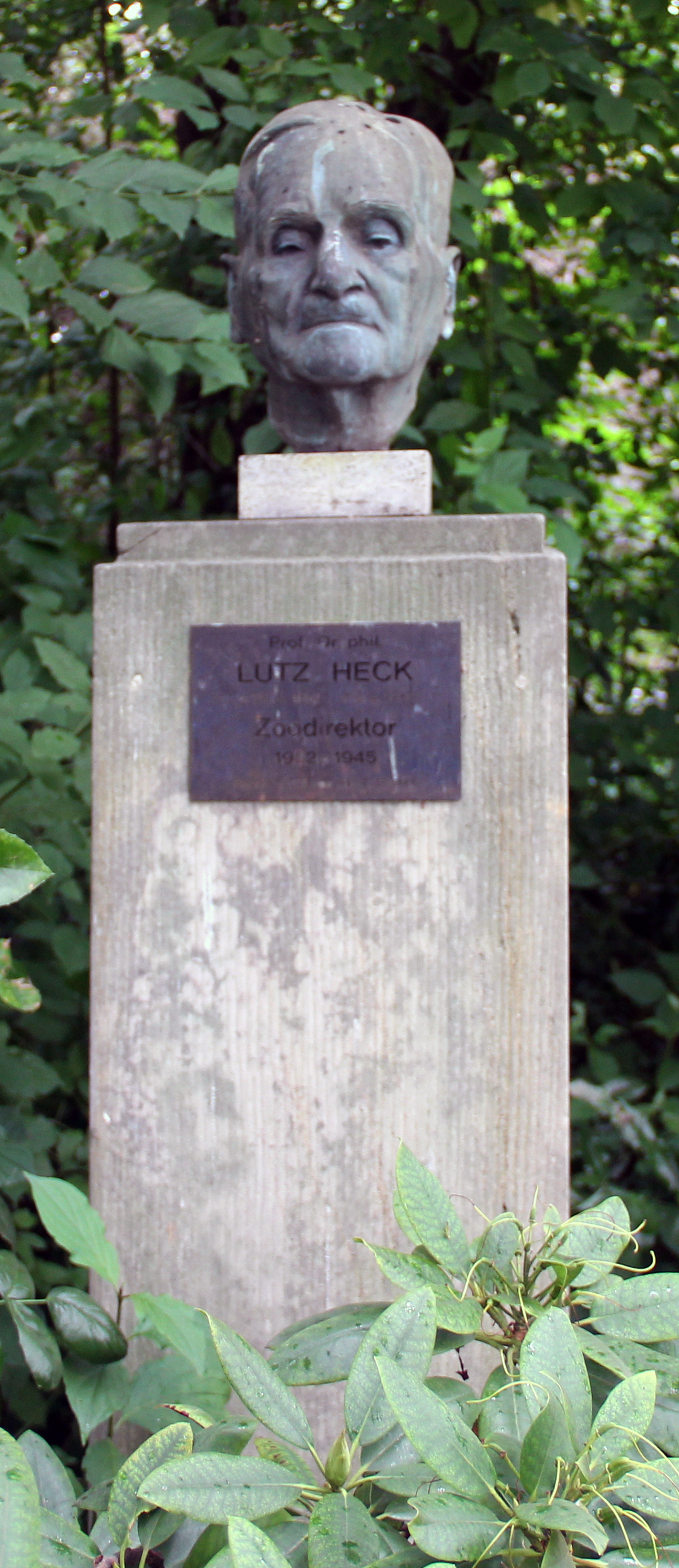
Bust of Lutz Heck in Berlin zoo

Ludwig Georg Heinrich Heck, called Lutz Heck (23 April 1892 in Berlin, German Empire – 6 April 1983 in Wiesbaden, West Germany) was a German zoologist, animal researcher, animal book author and director of the Berlin Zoological Garden where he succeeded his father in 1932. A member of the Nazi party from 1937, he was a close hunting friend of Hermann Göring, and worked under him. One of his projects was the reconstruction of extinct animals such as the aurochs through cross-breeding of various modern breeds which he thought had parts of the original genetic heritage. Heck cattle and Heck horses are named for the resulting animal breeds.

== Life and work ==
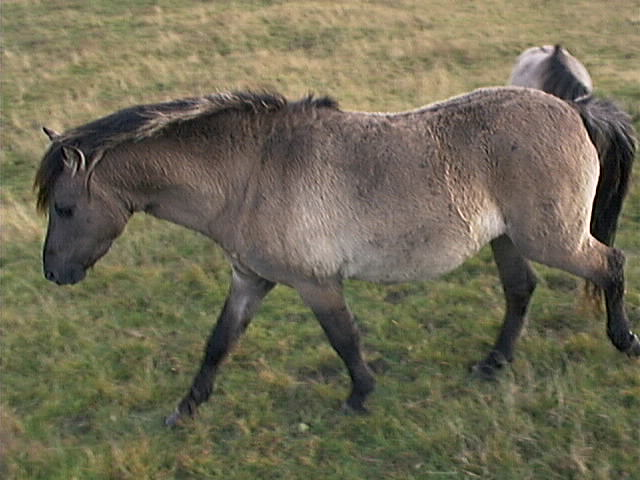
Heck horse in Haselünne, Germany (2004)

Lutz was the third child of Margarete and Ludwig Heck (1860–1951), director of Berlin Zoo from 1888 to 1931. He grew up with his brother in the grounds of the Berlin zoo and became very interested in animals and zoology from an early age. He was also influenced by German colonial explorer friends of his father and their tales from Africa. Lutz studied natural sciences at the University of Berlin. In 1925, Lutz went on a collection expedition to Ethiopia to obtain animals for Berlin Zoo. As a student he joined volunteer forces fighting protesting socialists on the streets of Berlin. After receiving his doctorate in 1922 he worked at Halle and became an assistant director at Berlin Zoo in 1927. In 1935 he went to Canada to obtain bison and moose specimens for the zoo. The trip, supported by Hermann Göring, was also a public relations exercise. He spoke to German expatriates on the benefits of National Socialism. Lutz took over as director of Berlin Zoo in 1932 but before that he worked with his brother Heinz Heck who became director (in 1928) of the largest zoological garden in southern Germany, Tierpark Hellabrunn in Munich. Along with his brother he started, from the 1920s, a selective breeding program, which attempted – based on the knowledge of animal genetics of the time – to "recreate" wild animal species such as the aurochs that are extinct, from various forms of the domestic animals whose ancestors they were "breeding back". They examined cave paintings and breeds across Europe for their idea of what the aurochs' ancestors may have been. By their work they created breeds of cattle and horse – later named "Heck cattle" and "Heck horse" respectively, after their creators – that are not sufficiently similar to their ancestors to be called a successful resurrection, although Heinz and Lutz Heck believed they had "resurrected" the breeds by their efforts. Lutz was interested in hunting and he chose fierce fighting breeds of cattle for his breeding experiments. He saw a plan to release his reconstituted aurochs into Hermann Göring’s private hunting reserves planned (as part of Generalplan Ost) in the Bialowieza forest between Poland and Belarus. Most of these were killed in the war.

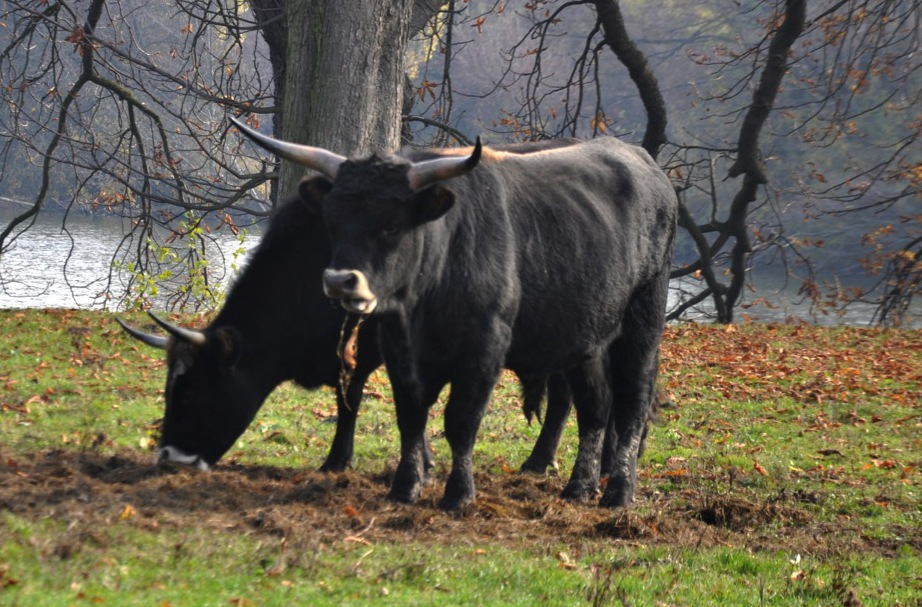
Heck cattle: an attempt from the 1920s to breed a look-alike aurochs from modern cattle

Heck joined the Förderndes Mitglied der SS in 1933 and the NSDAP in 1937 (member number 3.934.018). On the occasion of Adolf Hitler’s birthday the zoologist was appointed professor. In April 1938 he was appointed chief of the Oberste Naturschütz Behörde im Reichsforstamt (highest nature preservation agency in the state department of forestry) by his hunting friend Hermann Göring to whom he directly reported. In this capacity he was the senior responsible person for the entire nature management. In 1938, Heck passed a rule that prohibited Jews from visiting the zoo. Heck was a close confidant of Hermann Göring who had a special interest in lions. He raised lion cubs, had photos taken of him with them and when the animals became too large, would hand them to Lutz at the zoo. Heck attended a meeting of the SS in 1943 through his friend, director of the natural history museum at Salzburg, Eduard Tratz who was also an SS Obersturmbannführer. Here Heck was told that he was welcome to join the SS but he never went through with his application. Heck had a vision that zoos should allow for close contact between animals and humans. He envisioned a Kinderzoo for children where they could touch animals in a way that would "affect their soul". He believed that this experience would allow them to appreciate the Nazi world view.

During World War II, Heck took part in the pillaging of Warsaw Zoo, stealing the most valuable animals and taking them to German zoos. The Warsaw Zoo animals were subjected to abuse by occupying German forces and near constant bombing in the last years of the war, so Lutz assured the zookeepers in Warsaw that he would protect the animals. After the Battle of Berlin he fled with his wife to Bavaria, occupied by the Americans, to escape from Soviet prosecution. He was replaced by Dr. Katharina Heinroth as scientific director of the Berlin Zoo.

== After death ==
In 1984, a year after his death, a bust of Heck was placed in the zoo. In 2015, a petition was submitted to remove this bust because of Heck’s active involvement in National Socialism. In order to meet this request half way an information tablet on Heck’s past was added. In 2016, an exposition about the zoo during the Nazi era was opened in the antelope shelter.

The work of Lutz Heck features in a BBC Radio 4 documentary The Quest for the Aryan Cow, presented by the broadcaster and journalist Jon Ronson and produced by Beth O'Dea. The documentary “Hitler's Jurassic Monsters” presented by the National Geographic Channel deals with his work in the Bialowieza Forest.

Heck is played by Daniel Brühl in the film The Zookeeper's Wife (2017), which is based on Diane Ackerman's non-fiction book of the same name.

== Publications in English ==
- Heck, Lutz (1954). Animals: My Adventure. London: Methuen.

== Sources ==
- Van Vuure, Cis (2005). Retracing the Aurochs: History, Morphology and Ecology of an Extinct Wild Ox. Sofia, Bulgaria: Pensoft Publishers. ISBN 978-954-642-235-4.
- Prenger, Kevin (2018). War Zone Zoo - The Berlin Zoo & World War 2. ISBN 9781980352785.
