= Berlin Aquarium =

Aquarium Berlin
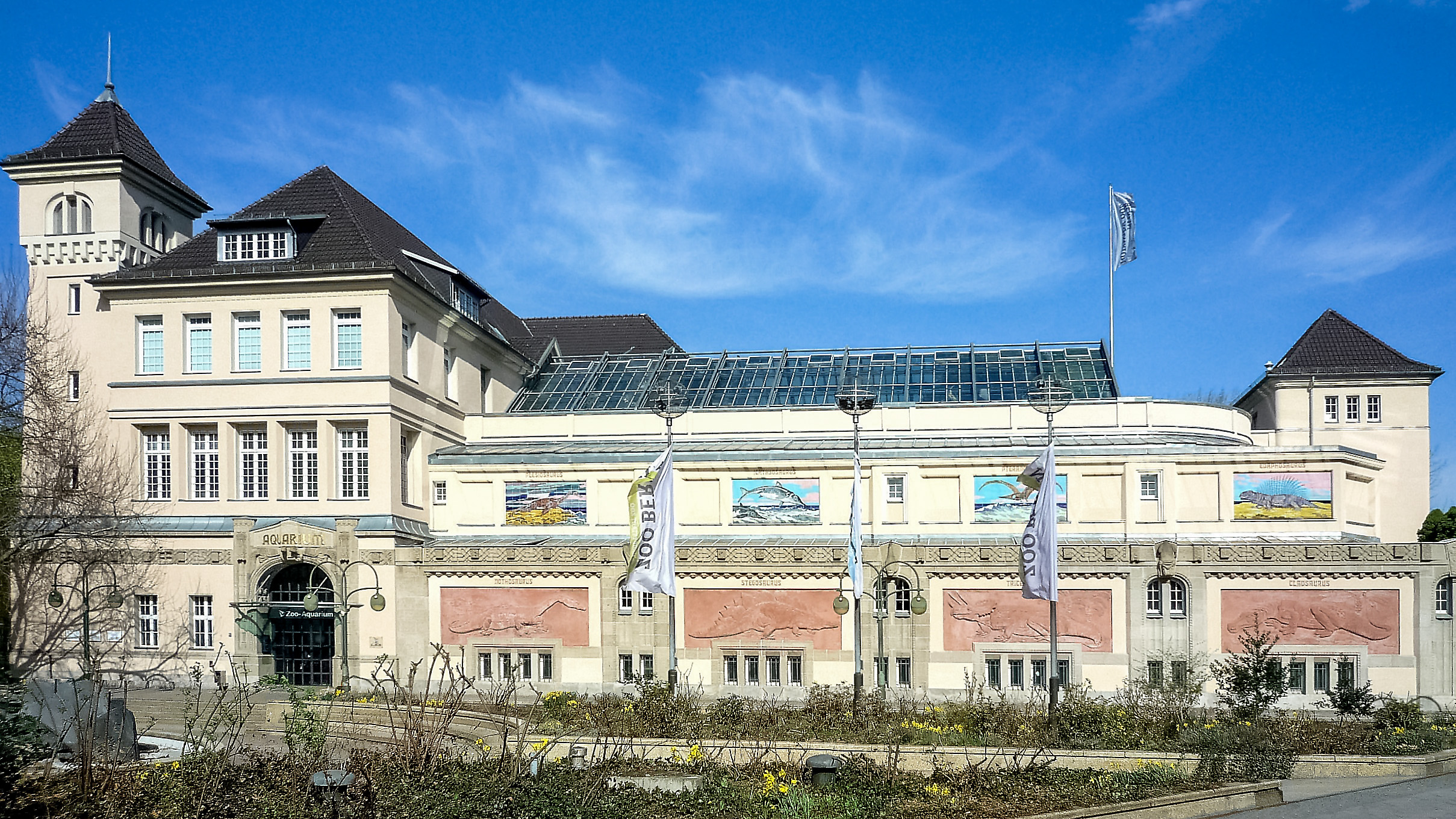
- Berlin Aquarium
- Interactive map of Aquarium Berlin
- 52°30′21″N 13°20′26″E
- Date opened: 1913
- Location: Berlin, Germany
- No. of animals: 9,000+
- No. of species: 800
- Website: www.aquarium-berlin.de/de

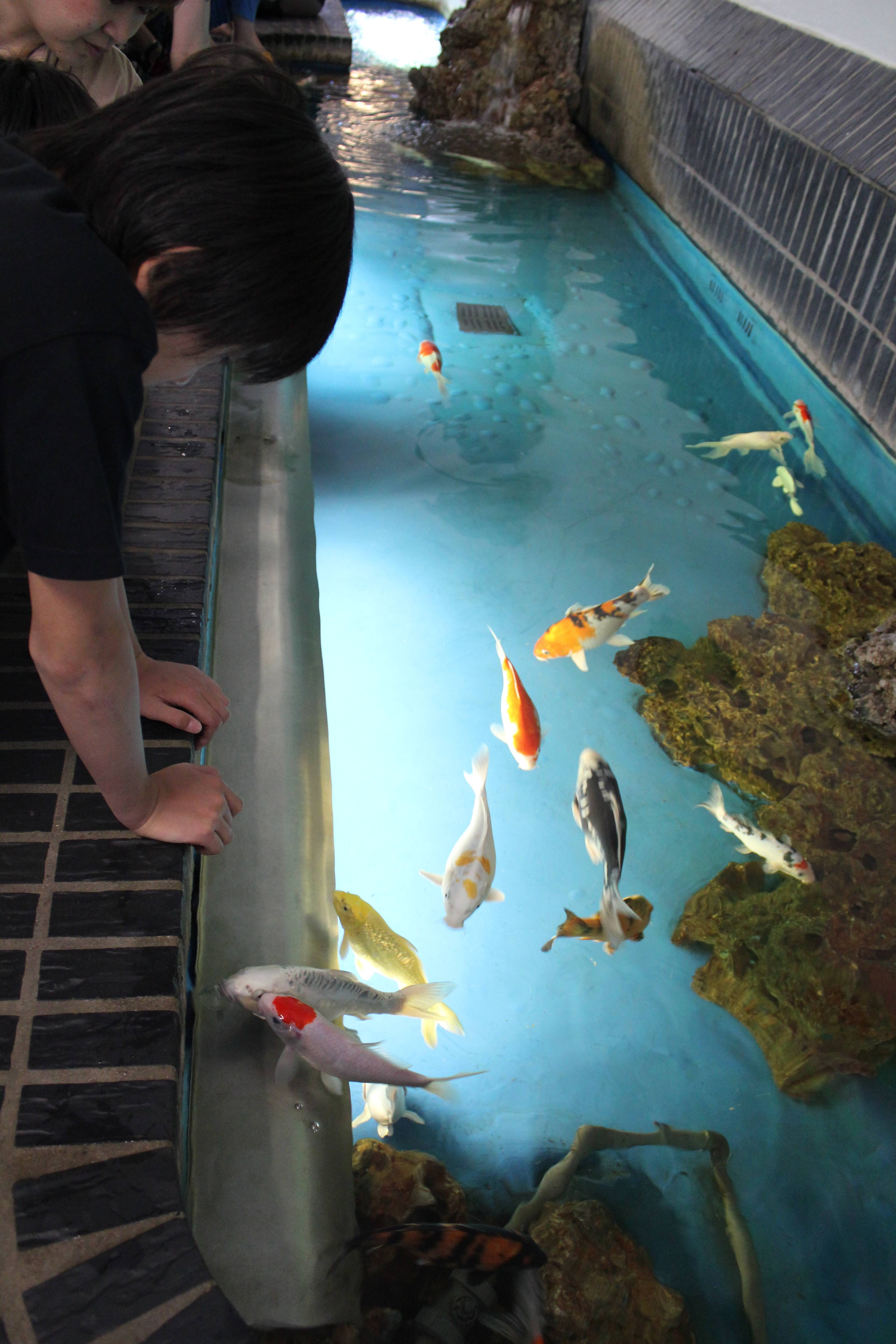
Nishiki Goi koi carps

The Aquarium Berlin in Berlin is one of Germany's largest aquariums. The aquarium was built in 1913 as part of the Berlin Zoological Garden complex. Since its opening, the Zoo-Aquarium has been ranked among the public aquariums with the world's greatest biodiversity.

== Exhibits ==
Over 9,000 animals are presented on three storeys. It contains jellyfish, tropical and native fishes, crocodilians (caimans and gharial), and a broad variety of insects. In addition to its 250 tanks for fish, the aquarium houses a wide variety of amphibians and reptiles, including tuataras.

The shark tank presents the blacktip reef shark and other species.

With a total capacity of 25,000 litres (6,600 US gal), twelve basins present different sections through the world of corals. The largest of these basins is the 11-cubic-metre (2,900 US gal) Great Coral Basin with its reproduction lagoon.
