= Oskar Heinroth =

German zoologist

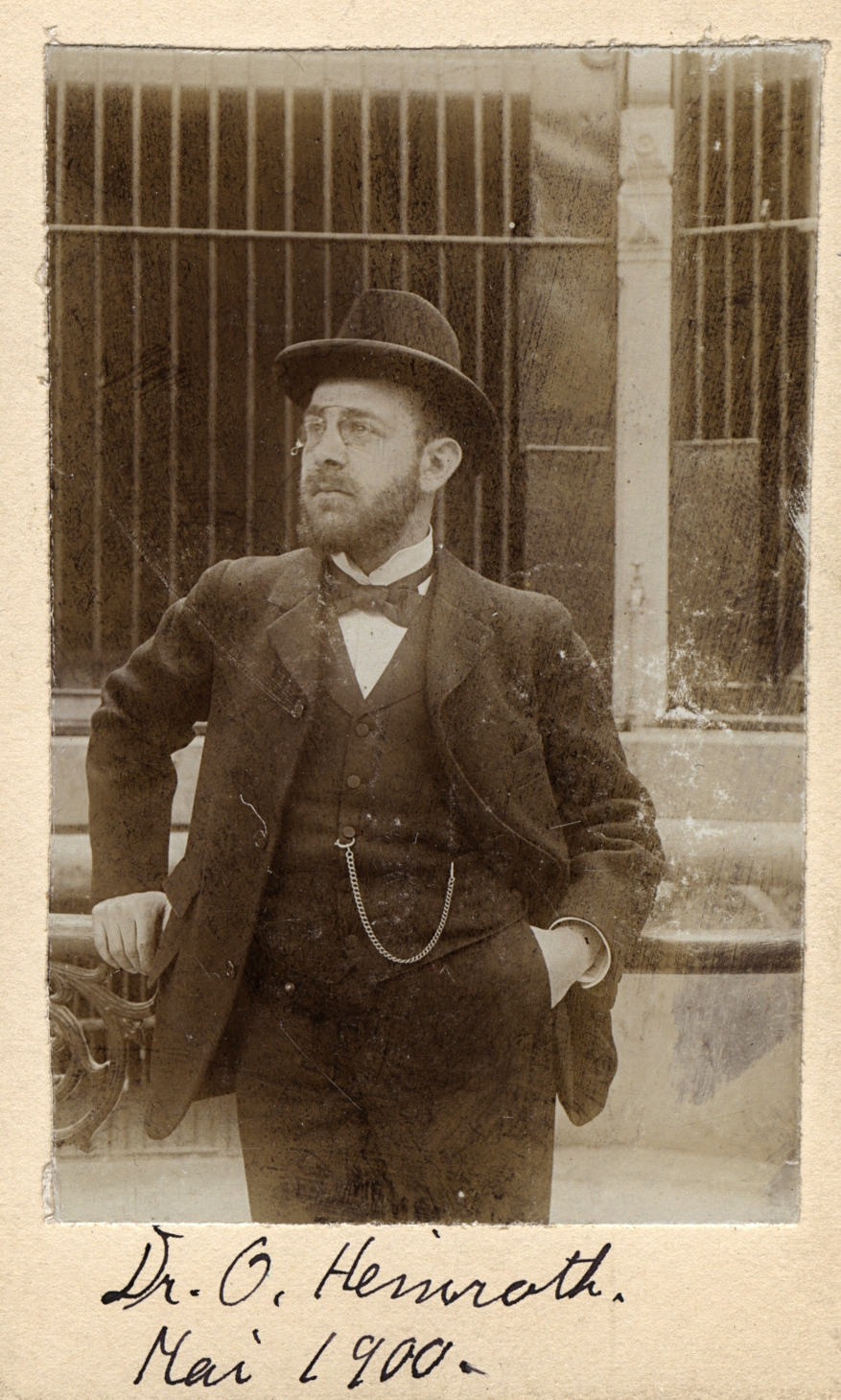
- Born: 1 March 1871; Mainz, German Empire
- Died: 31 May 1945 (aged 74); Berlin, Germany
- Known for: Applying methods of comparative morphology to animal behavior
- Spouses: Magdalena Heinroth née Wiebe, Katharina Heinroth née Berger
- Scientific career
- Fields: Pioneering ethologist
- Workplaces: Berlin Aquarium

Oskar Heinroth (1 March 1871 – 31 May 1945) was a German biologist who was one of the first to apply the methods of comparative morphology to animal behavior, and was thus one of the founders of ethology. He worked, largely isolated from most other scientists of the period, at the Berlin Aquarium where he took care of fish, reptiles and birds, especially waterfowl. He died under Soviet interrogation in Berlin on 31 May 1945.

== Biography ==
Heinroth was born in Mainz-Kastel. He studied medicine and graduated in 1895, but later studied zoology at Berlin while working at the Zoological Garden and at the Natural History Museum. He joined an expedition to the Bismarck Archipelago in 1900-1901 serving as a zoologist to Bruno Mencke, the South Seas expedition leader who was attacked and killed in an encounter with indigenous peoples while Heinroth himself escaped with a spear wound. In 1904, Heinroth became an assistant at the Berlin Zoological Garden. He began his studies of duck and goose behavior while working as a scientific assistant from 1898 to 1913. In 1911, he became the director of the Berlin Aquarium, a post he held for more than 30 years. He married Magdalena Wiebe (1883–1932) who was also interested in animals and was a skilled taxidermist and aviculturist. After her death, Heinroth married Katharina Berger in 1933, a herpetologist who headed the Berlin Zoo after World War II. He died under Soviet interrogation in Berlin on 31 May 1945. Heinroth was largely self-taught and was not affiliated with any academic institution but his second wife Katharina had received a doctorate in 1925 under Otto Koehler (1889–1974) and together they published numerous pioneering works on animal behaviour.

== Contributions to zoology ==
Heinroth made extensive studies of behavior in the Anatidae (ducks and geese) and made bold hypotheses that many of their instinctive behavior patterns and morphological features correlated with their life histories. He suggested for instance that the conspicuous wing patterns of ducks might serve to guide flocks in flight. He also recognized that ducks with sexual dimorphism tended to have polygamous males with large testes. Heinroth noted behaviours of ducks and those of hybrids and suggested that their behavioural cues could be used to deduce taxonomic relationships. Heinroth had noted that chickens were alarmed by long-tailed and short-necked birds suggesting that these were the key characteristics of birds of prey. The idea that this response was instinctive was examined in greater detail by Konrad Lorenz and Niko Tinbergen. He also rediscovered the phenomenon of imprinting, reported in the 19th century by Douglas Spalding but not followed up at the time. His results were popularized by Konrad Lorenz, his pupil. Heinroth introduced the word "ethologie", as it is currently understood, in his 1910 Beitrage zur Biologie, namentlich Ethologie und Psychologie der Anatiden. Lorenz regarded Heinroth as the true founder of the study of animal behavior seen as a branch of zoology. Lorenz also credited Heinroth with creating an important method for understanding instincts in birds.

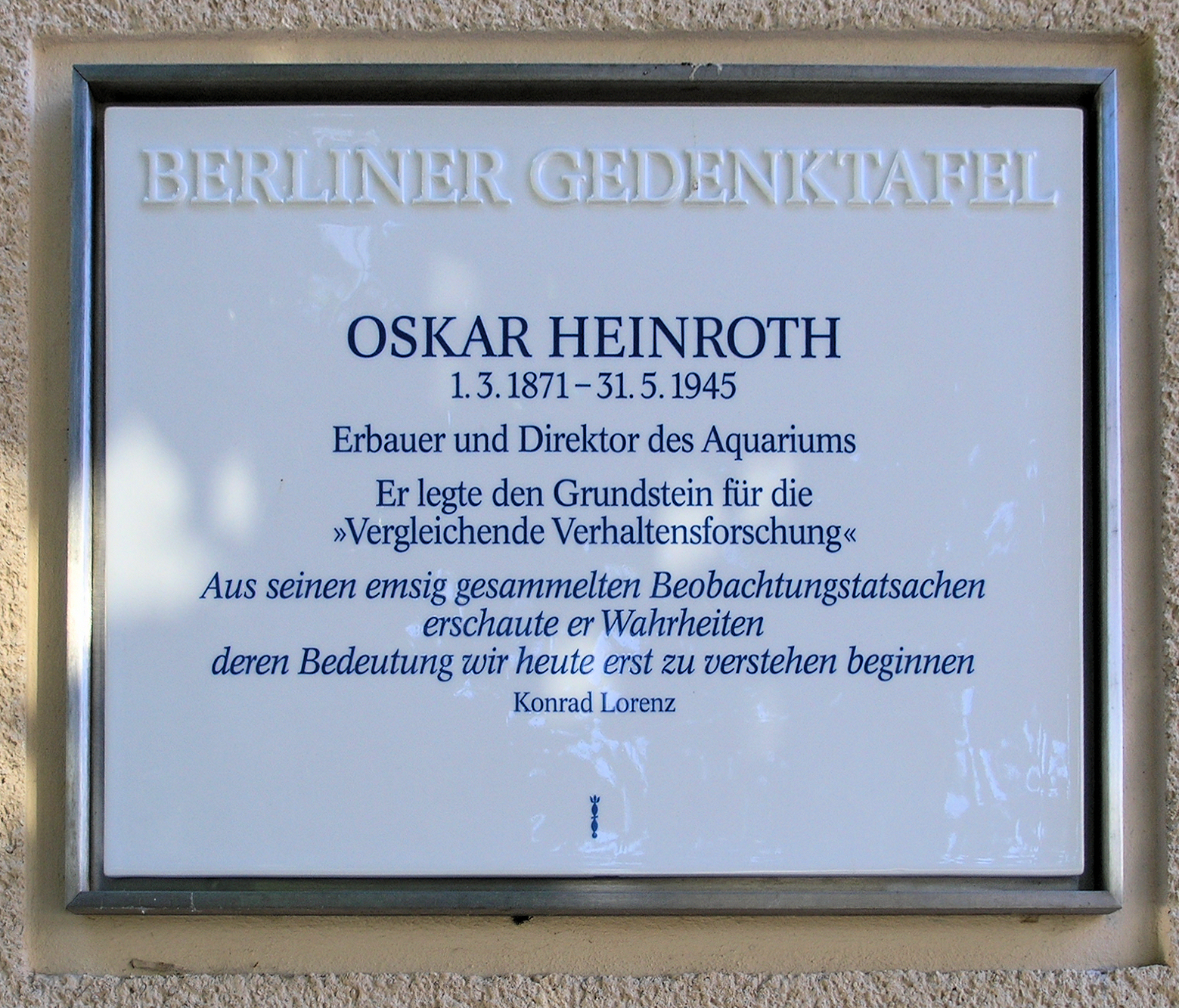
Commemorative plaque in Berlin

== Bibliography ==
- Gefiederte Meistersinger, sound book in collaboration with Ludwig Koch (1935)
- The Birds (with Katharina Heinroth). Ann Arbor: University of Michigan Press, 1958. ISBN 0-472-05005-2

== In popular culture ==
Heinroth features in the book "The Case of the 'Hail Mary' Celeste" by Malcolm Pryce, particularly with reference to his work on imprinting. The book also refers to a fictional "Heinroth Prize".
