= Serengeti Shall Not Die =

1959 film

- Cover art for the 1992 VHS video release
- Directed by: Bernhard Grzimek
- Written by: Bernhard Grzimek
- Produced by: Bernhard Grzimek
- Narrated by: Bernhard Grzimek
- Edited by: Klaus Dudenhöfer
- Music by: Wolfgang Zeller
- Distributed by: Bernhard Grzimek
- Release date: June 25, 1959
- Running time: 85 minutes
- Country: Germany
- Language: German

Serengeti Shall Not Die (German: Serengeti darf nicht sterben; also known as Serengeti) is a 1959 German documentary film written and directed by Bernhard Grzimek. It was also the title of a book written by Bernhard Grzimek (with his son Michael included as a coauthor) which was published in 1961, translated from German and published by E. P. Dutton and Co., New York.

His son, cinematographer Michael Grzimek, died on-location during the filming of the documentary when a plane he piloted collided with a vulture.

It won the Academy Award for Best Documentary Feature in 1960.
