= Magdalena Heinroth =

German zoologist, taxidermist and aviculturist (1883–1932)

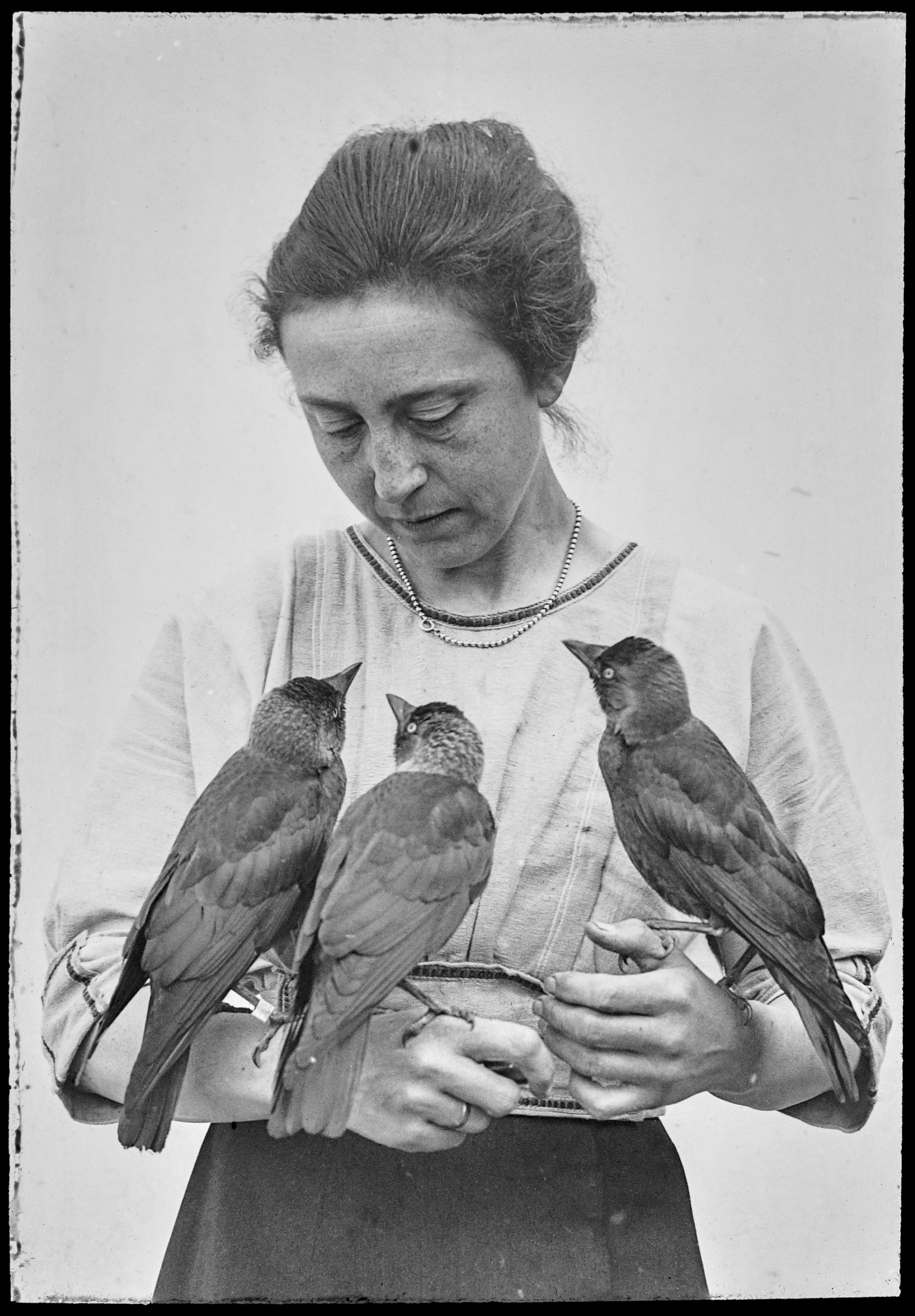
- Born: Magdalena Wiebe; 22 April 1883; Berlin
- Died: 15 August 1932 (aged 49); Ploiești, Romania
- Known for: Rearing and studying birds of birds of 286 species
- Spouse: Oskar Heinroth (m. 1904)
- Awards: Leibniz Medal
- Scientific career
- Fields: Ornithology
- Institutions: Zoologisches Museum, now Museum für Naturkunde Berlin

Magdalena Heinroth née Wiebe (22 April 1883 - 15 August 1932) was a German ornithologist, aviculturist and taxidermist who studied numerous birds in captivity, raising them from chicks to adults. She was married to Oskar Heinroth.

== Biography ==
Magdalena was born in Berlin, daughter of Adolf Wiebe and a relative Helene (sharing the family name Wiebe) who came from families in the Prussian civil service. She took an early interest in animals on family visits to the zoo. At the age of 12 she had an ear injury and had to undergo an operation. She took a keen interest in anatomy, asking the surgeon many questions. Magdalena Heinroth was also influenced by a natural history teacher Seinig who showed her how to prepare skeleton specimens. She then set up a small personal museum and also learned illustration techniques from an experienced woman, professor Ewald.

Along with her father, the sixteen year old Magdalena went to the Zoologisches Museum, today Museum für Naturkunde Berlin, and the curator Karl August Möbius who sent her to Oskar Heinroth, then a volunteer. She worked for a while in taxidermy under the preparator Richard Lemm and her works were made use of in the Die Vögel Mitteleuropas (1928-1933). In 1902 Heinroth got engaged with Magdalena with the gift of a blackcap (Sylvia atricapilla). The couple got married when Oskar Heinroth became assistant director at the Zoologischer Garten Berlin in 1904.

The couple worked together and travelled across Europe. Magdalena was fascinated by the possibility to fly and to have a view like a bird. She had different health problems and underwent a surgery for breast cancer. She died 1932 from complications probably arising from an abdominal surgery that she underwent in 1931.

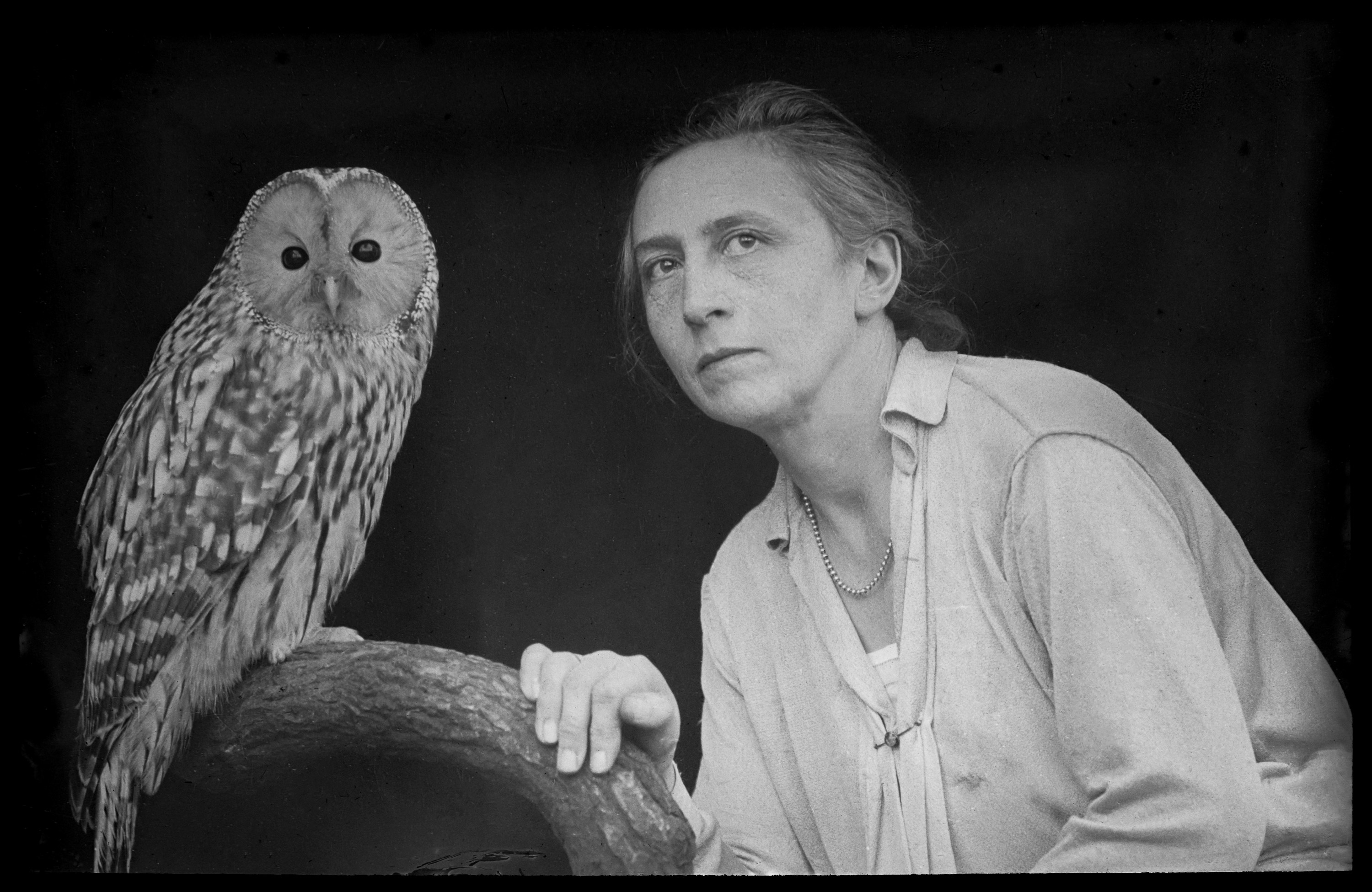
Magdalena Heinroth, Berlin 1929

== Contribution to Zoology ==
Magdalena and Oskar Heinroth raised a large number of birds, including birds that were rare in captivity, in their apartment, taking measurements, while studying the growth and the behaviour of nestlings and of adult parenting strategies. In the 28 years of rearing birds, the couple had made observations on 1000 birds of 286 species, including species that were unusual in captivity such as the European Nightjar (Caprimulgus europaeus), and were working towards their major publication: Die Vögel von Miteleuropa. The couple received a silver Leibniz Medal in 1930.

Since Oskar Heinroth was the founder and in-charge of the new Berliner Aquarium, his wife organized the documentation of their bird raising program. At the beginning of the 20th century she published her notes on aviculture in the worldwide oldest bird journal Gefiederte Wel.
