= Waldemar Grzimek =

German sculptor

Grzimek in 1955

Waldemar Grzimek (December 5, 1918 Rastenburg, Germany – May 26, 1984 Berlin (West)) was a German sculptor.

Grzimek was born in Rastenburg, East Prussia (now Kętrzyn, Warmia-Masuria, Poland) to a Silesian family, which moved to Berlin in 1925 when Grzimek's father Günther Grzimek was elected to the Preußischer Landtag.

As a child, Grzimek enjoyed the exotic animals of the Berlin Zoo, sometimes accompanied by the second cousin of his father Bernhard Grzimek. This was also where he met Hugo Lederer, a professor at Berlin's Akademie der Künste (Academy of Arts), who inspired Grzimek to take up sculpting. During his adolescent years he produced sculptures of an American bison, an African rhinoceros, busts of his parents heads, and a pet Skye Terrier.

After high school, Grzimek worked as an apprentice stonemason for the construction company Philipp Holzmann AG and also studied sculpture under Wilhelm Gerstel. He completed his degree in 1941, then served in the Kriegsmarine until the end of World War II, after which he worked as an art professor and as a freelance sculptor.

Famous works by Grzimek include the Heinrich Heine Memorial (in honor of the 19th-century poet Heinrich Heine), the fountain at Wittenbergplatz, and Holocaust memorials at the Sachsenhausen and Buchenwald concentration camps.

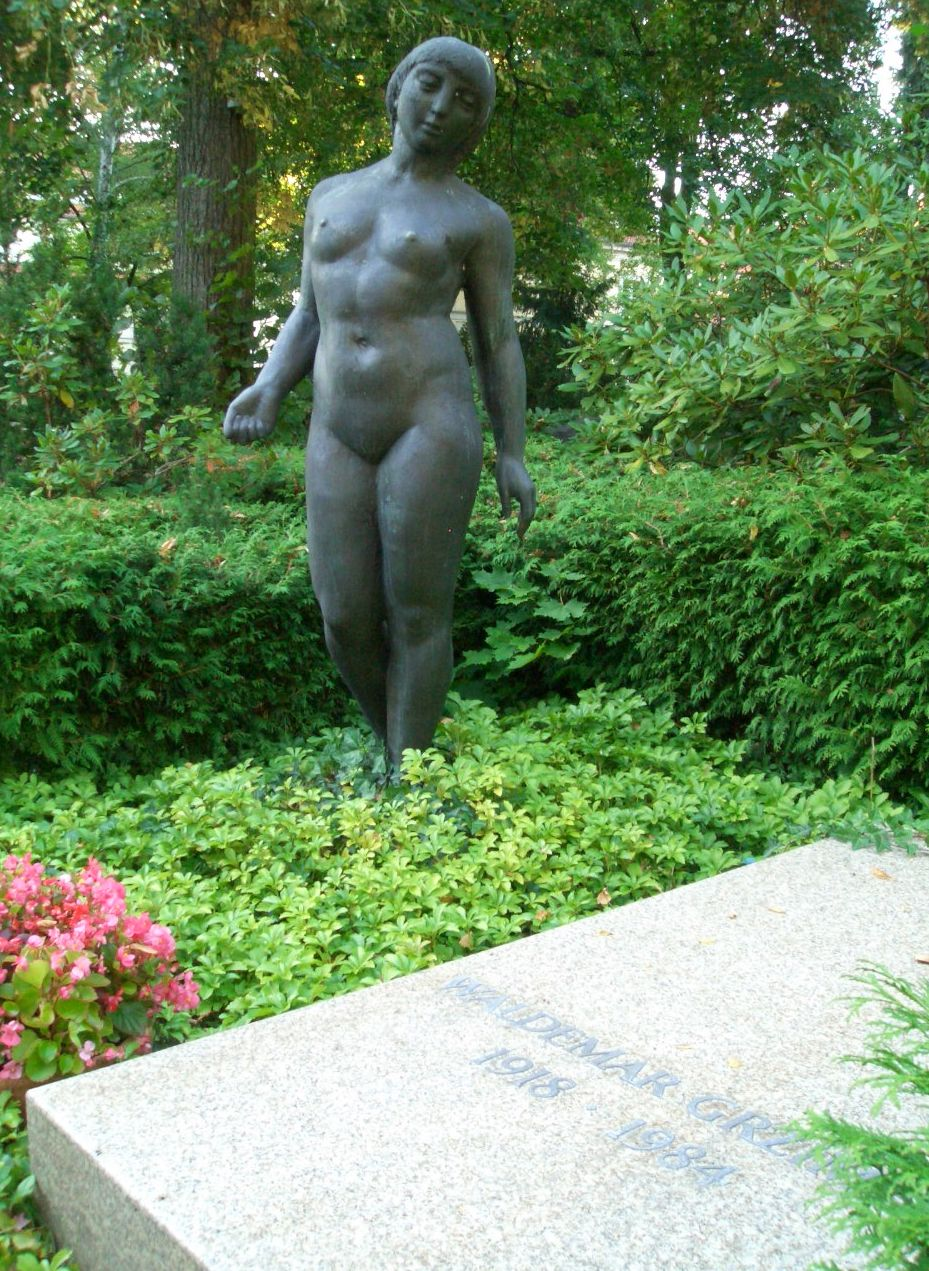
Waldemar Grzimek's grave at Friedhof Dahlem, accompanied by one of his own statues

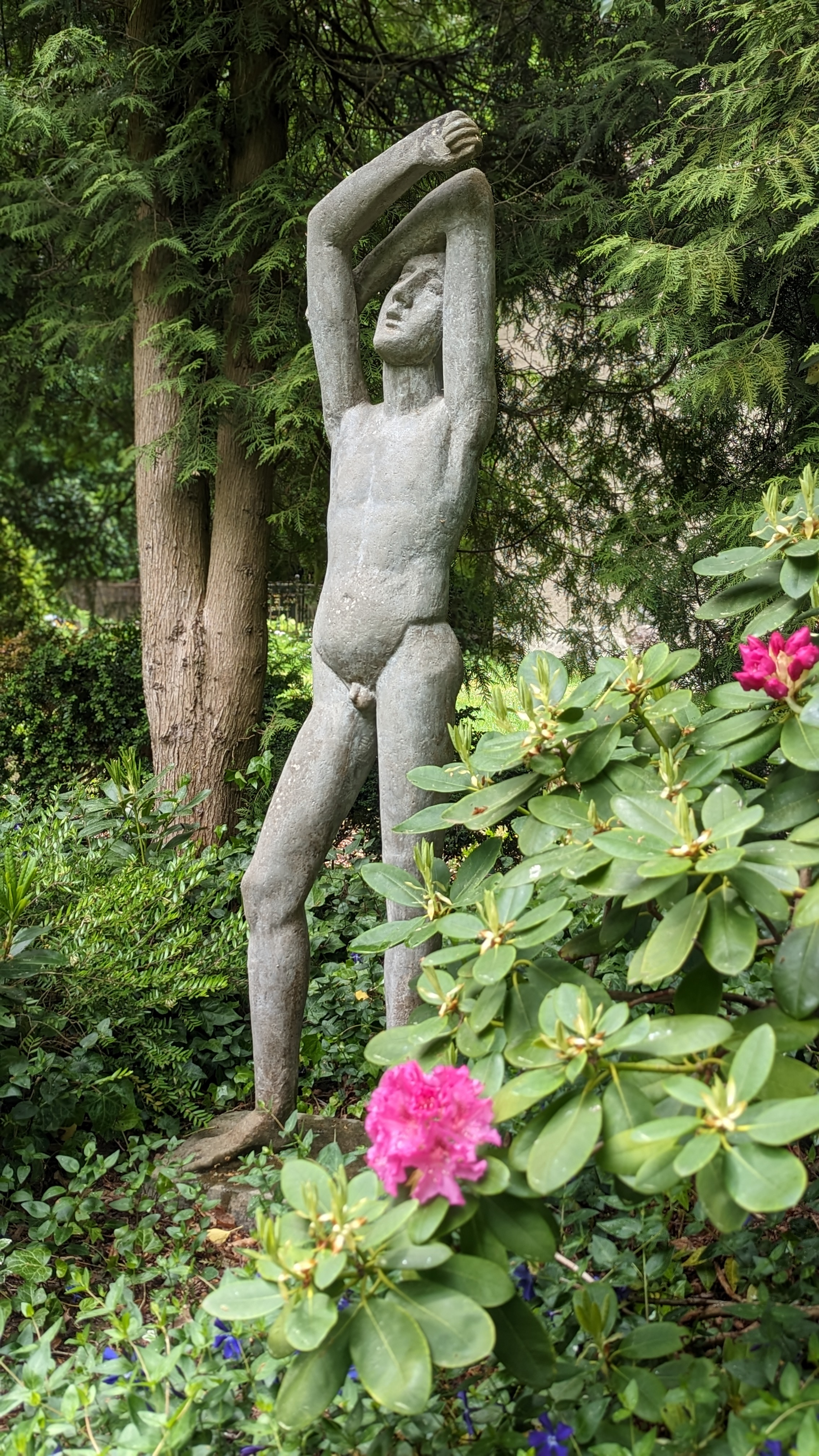
Jüngling, concrete sculpture, at the gravesite of Otto Niemeyer-Holstein, Benz, Usedom, Germany
