= Michael Grzimek =

German film director

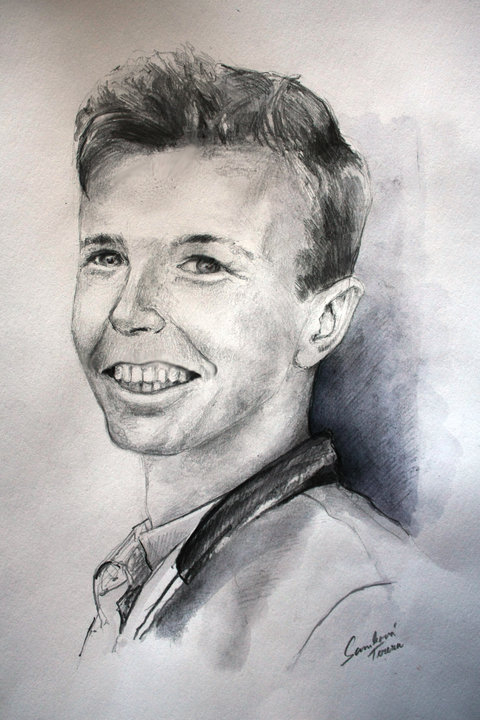
- Michael Grzimek
- Born: 12 April 1934; Berlin, Germany
- Died: 10 January 1959 (aged 24); Tanganyika, Tanzania
- Occupation: Filmmaker
- Spouse: Erika Schoof (m. 1955)
- Parents: Bernhard Grzimek (father); Hildegard Prüfer (mother)

Michael Grzimek (12 April 1934 – 10 January 1959) was a West German zoologist, conservationist and filmmaker.

== Life ==
Michael Grzimek was the second son of Bernhard Grzimek and Hildegard Prüfer. Already as a child, he assisted his father in his research of wolves and dogs. He spent the last years of the Second World War with his mother and his older brother Rochus on an old farm in Allgäu, which his father had bought in the 1930s.

At 16, he accompanied his father on an expedition to Ivory Coast. The success that followed his father's book Kein Platz für wilde Tiere (No room for wild animals), which describes their 1954 Congo expedition, made Michael persuade his father to make a colour film based on it. Although they had to borrow over 10 000 German marks, to make it and they thought it would be unsuccessful, as the film portrayed animals as peaceful (at that time an unusual thing), the film unexpectedly won two Golden Bears (one as viewers' favourite film and the other from the International panel of academics) at the 1956 Berlin International Film Festival and was sold to 63 countries (including the Eastern bloc, China and Japan) and grossed a lot of money worldwide. It also won another award, the Bundesfilmpreis. The Grzimeks' offered their profits to extend the Serengeti. Peter Molley, the director of the Tanganyikan national parks, suggested that the money would be better spent making a new survey of the number of wild animals and their migration routes so that the borders of the Serengeti could be better established.

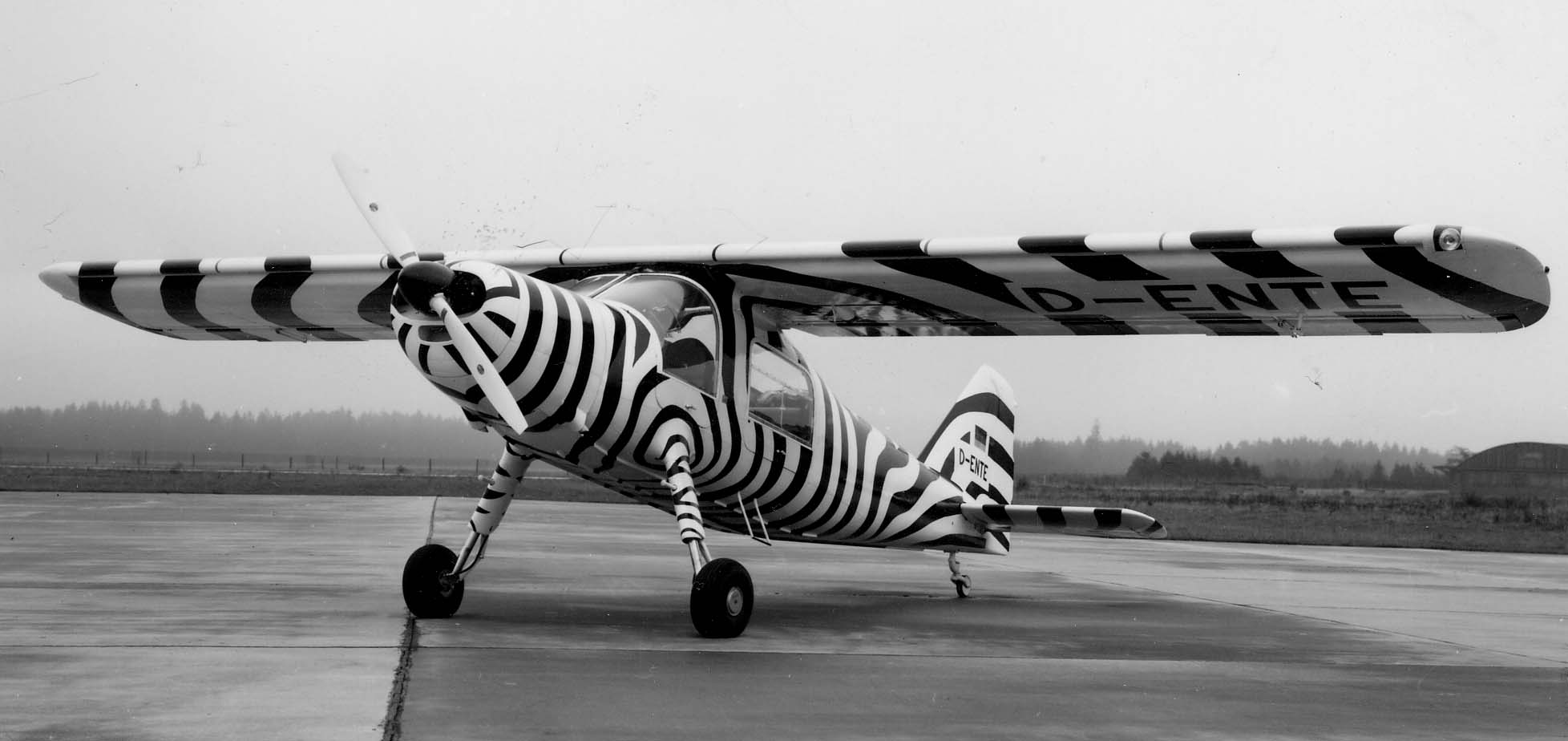
Do 27 which belonged to Michael Grzimek

During these vast explorations (which also served Michael as a preparation for a university degree), these routes were mapped precisely for the first time, and the number of the animals in their herds could be counted. It was 367 000, one third of the expected number. Both Grzimeks had to get a pilot license and buy a plane, a Dornier Do 27. To make it look natural to the animals, they painted it with a zebra stripes pattern. The code of the plane was D-ENTE. ("D" stood for Germany, "E" for single engine light aircraft; they could choose the other three letters, and, as they wanted an animal name, they chose "ente", German for "duck". Bernhard Grzimek joked that they could also have used "esel", German for "donkey", if they had thought of it then.)

== Personal life ==
Michael Grzimek married Erika Schoof (1932–2020) on 26 May 1955. They had two sons, Stephan Michael (b. 1956), and Christian Bernhard (b. 1959, after Michael's death). In 1978, Michael's father Bernhard married Erika and adopted the two children. Erika Schoof – and along with Christian Grzimek since 1980 – became the head of the Okapia KG Michael Grzimek & Co which is an archive of photos and files.

== Death ==
On 10 January 1959, the plane piloted by Michael collided with a vulture and he lost control. He was killed in the crash. He was buried the same day on the top of the Ngorongoro Crater. Later the government of Tanzania erected a stone pyramid over his grave. Bernhard Grzimek was buried there after his death in 1987.

== Legacy ==
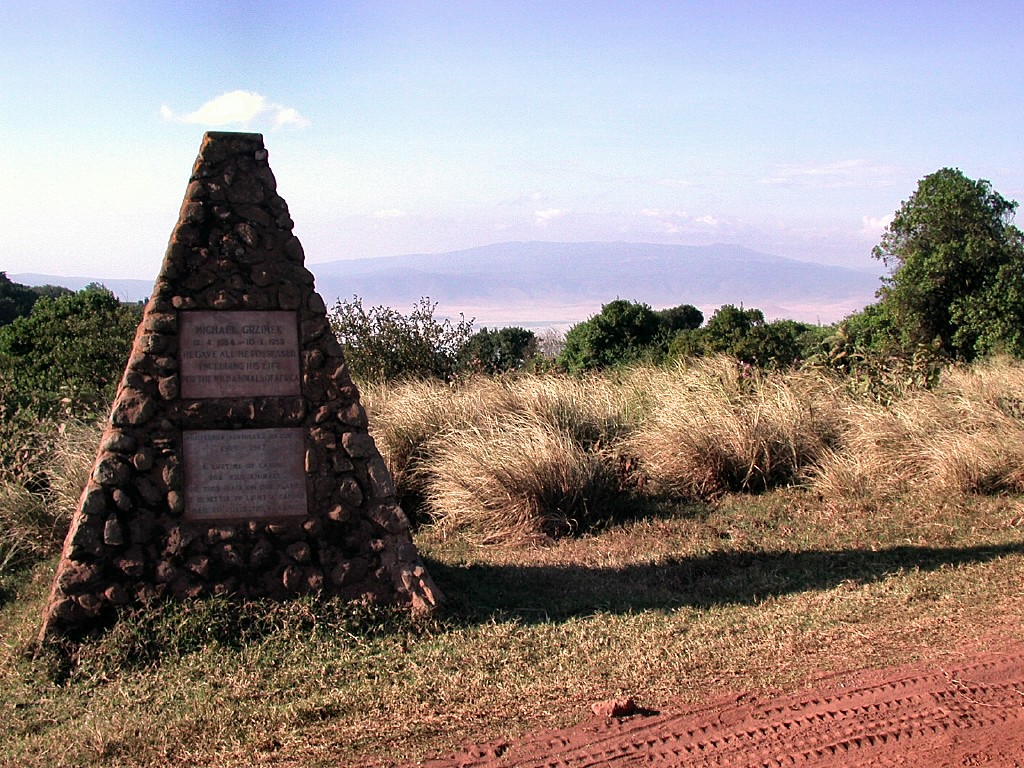
The grave of Michael Grzimek and his father Bernhard

Michael's survey, basically finished by the time he died, were the reason for the enlargement of the Serengeti National Park. Bernhard Grzimek finished their second film, Serengeti darf nicht sterben (Serengeti shall not die), which brought attention to the conservation problems in the area and also wrote an eponymous book. The film was very successful - among other, it won the 1959 'Academy Award for Best Documentary Feature'; it was the first German film to win this prize; and so was the book, which was translated into 23 languages and sold millions of copies.

Three schools, one in Frankfurt, one in Berlin and one in Nairobi, are named after Michael Grzimek. The main building of the Serengeti Research Institute is named Michael Grzimek's Memorial Laboratory.

His tomb bears this inscription:

HE GAVE ALL HE POSSESSED
INCLUDING HIS LIFE
FOR THE WILD ANIMALS OF AFRICA

The same inscription is on a nine-ton steel statue which was erected to Michael's memory in Cincinnati, Ohio in 1969.

== Works ==
=== Films ===
- Kein Platz für wilde Tiere, 1956
- Serengeti darf nicht sterben (prepared for the screen by Bernhard Grzimek), 1959

=== Books ===
- Serengeti darf nicht sterben (prepared for publication by Bernhard Grzimek), 1959

== Literature ==
- Gerhard Grzimek, Rupprecht Grzimek: "Die Familie Grzimek aus Oberglogau in Oberschlesien", in: Deutsches Familienarchiv, Band X, Verlag Degener & Co., Neustadt (Aisch) 1958. 4., erweiterte und überarbeitete Ausgabe, Herder-Institut, Reutlingen 2000.

== External links (in German) and references ==
- Short biography, in English
- ZDF: Bernhard Grzimek - Eine deutsche Legende
- Okapia KG Michael Grzimek & Co
