= Otto Koehler =

German zoologist (1889–1974)

Otto Koehler (20 December 1889 – 7 January 1974) was a German zoologist and pioneer ethologist. He was a founding editor, along with Konrad Lorenz of the Zeitschrift für Tierpsychologie (Journal of animal psychology) which was later renamed as Ethology. He was among the earliest to explore the numerical abilities of animals, and to use tools like film to study animal behaviour.

Otto was born in Insterburg, Prussia, the fifth and the only child to survive of Lutheran pastor Eduard Koehler and his second wife Karoline née Heinrici. His mother died after his birth and his father died four years later leaving him in the care of his uncle Paul Heinrici. He went to the Royal school at Pforta in 1902 and matriculated in 1907 to then study at the University of Freiburg. He studied mathematics and history and attended August Weismann's classes on zoology and evolution. In 1908, he moved to the Ludwig-Maximilians-Universität München where he studied botany and listened to lectures in physics from Wilhelm Conrad Röntgen. He studied the biology of a sea urchin Strongylocentrotus lividus under Richard von Hertwig and obtained a doctorate. He then worked as an assistant to Franz Doflein and then worked with Karl von Frisch. During the war Koehler was in charge of bacteriological examinations at a military hospital near Metz in 1914. He then set up a laboratory in Anatolia in 1916 and became an English prisoner of war in Nazareth. In 1919, he moved to Wroclaw where Franz Doflein had moved.

Koehler studied geotaxis in Paramecium, color vision in Daphnia and examined the perception of magnetic fields and UV in animals. He lectured on sensory physiology and animal psychology. Koehler worked with Karl von Frisch and trained dragonfly larvae to feed on yellow food thereby showing that they could recognize colour. In 1923, he became an associate professor in Munich and in 1925 he became directory of the Museum at the University of Königsberg.

Koehler experimented on animals to identify if they had what was needed for human thinking and was especially interested in behaviours that demonstrated counting (which he called as unnamed thinking). He examined the behaviour of sandpiper's at the nest and used dummy eggs to check how the birds recognized their own eggs. He was also among the first biologists to use films to record animal behaviour for subsequent analysis. In 1937, he established the German Society for Animal Psychology and began its journal Zeitschrift für Tierpsychologie with Konard Lorenz and Carl Kronacher. From 1986 it was renamed as Ethology.

After the war, Otto Koehler had lost his wife Annemarie Deditius whom he had married in Breslau in 1920 to an illness and Königsberg was in ruins. He was appointed a professor at the University of Freiburg in 1946, and he married a former student Amélie Hauchecorne, great-granddaughter of Wilhelm Hauchecorne. His first doctoral student Paul Leyhausen studied tiger-lion hybrids, and he continued his research on the counting ability of animals. He also took an interest in bioacoustics.
