= Feral (book) =

2013 book by George Monbiot

Feral - Rewilding the land, sea and human life
- Searching for enchantment on the frontiers of rewilding
- Author: George Monbiot
- Language: English
- Subject: Rewilding
- Genre: non-fiction
- Publisher: Penguin Books
- Publication date: October 2013
- Media type: paperback
- Pages: 316
- ISBN: 978-1846147487

Feral: Searching for Enchantment on the Frontiers of Rewilding (also published as Feral: rewilding the land, sea and human life) is a 2013 book by the British activist George Monbiot. In it, Monbiot discusses rewilding, particularly in the United Kingdom. It was first published by Allen Lane, a hardback imprint of the Penguin Group. The book received positive critical reviews, and won several awards. It inspired the founding of Rewilding Britain.

== Background ==
By Monbiot's own account, rewilding was a fringe interest at the time he published the book. However, there had been attempts at rewilding in Britain such as "Wild Ennerdale" at Ennerdale, Cumbria, a project which Monbiot finds limited in scope.

The word ‘rewilding’ entered the dictionary in 2011, with its definition greatly contested from the start. Initially, it was defined as releasing captive animals into the wild, but the definition was soon expanded to describe the reintroduction of animal and plant species to habitats from which they had been excised. In other circles, the term is used to indicate the rehabilitation of entire ecosystems, instead of particular species only. The definitions preferred by the author differ slightly from these, as they entail permitting ecological processes to resume (without human intervention), and embracing the fluctuations in the physical environment (instead of attempting to keep it in a state of arrested development). In summary, Monbiot defines the concept as follows: “Rewilding, to me, is about resisting the urge to control nature and allowing it to find its own way.”

== Synopsis ==
Monbiot addresses readers who feel the urge for a wilder life and encourages them to challenge their perception of humankind’s place in the world, the world's ecosystems, and the interaction between humankind and nature. While also referencing his own experiences exploring the Welsh coastline and mountains, Monbiot looks at rewilding projects around the world, and pays particular attention to the scope for rewilding in the United Kingdom. He argues that overgrazing is a problem in the British uplands and calls for sheep numbers to be reduced so that areas can be rewilded. The author looks at the phenomenon of British big cats, supposed sightings which in his view reflect human origins in a wilder landscape. The author discusses the risks and benefits of reintroducing several species to the UK, including beavers, wolves and lynx, arguing that some recently extinct megafauna being reintroduced could provide ecosystem and economic benefits.

After initial chapters that serve as an introduction to the author’s personal and academic interest in the subject matter, the content takes the form of case studies. According to the author, case studies relating successful rewilding projects around the world (Scotland, Wales, North America) serve to provide examples of good practice and offer the reader hope (that rewilding is indeed possible). In chapter 11, “The Beast Within (or how not to rewild)”, case studies of rewilding in Slovenia, Croatia, Eastern Poland and the Americas that occurred as result of political tyranny, civil war, genocide and tyranny serve as cautionary tales. The author strongly believes that rewilding must not be an opposition to the people who live on and benefit from the land but must be done with their consent and active engagement. Monbiot is critical of the current state of conservation in the United Kingdom and advocates for sea rewilding and expansion of marine reserves.

== Reception ==
The book received favourable reviews, including in publications normally hostile to Monbiot's work, such as The Spectator and The Daily Telegraph. Many reviewers were impressed by the lyrical nature of the book's prose style. According to the New Statesman's reviewer "something about the charm and persistence of Monbiot’s argument has the hypnotic effect of a stoat beguiling a hapless rabbit". Some organisations representing farmers, such as the Farmers' Union of Wales objected to the book's characterisation of sheep farming as environmentally damaging and the Welsh Uplands as a "slow-burning ecological disaster".

== Awards ==
The book won awards from:

- The Zoological Society of London: Thomson Reuters/Zoological Record Award (2013). Presented for the public communication of zoology.
- The Society of Biology: Book Award for general biology (2014). Dr William Marshall, Fellow of the Society of Biology and chair of the judging panel, said Feral was an “important and captivating book concerning humanity’s stewardship of the earth”.
- Orion magazine: The Orion Book Award for nonfiction (2015).

== Outcomes ==
One of the outcomes of the book was the charity Rewilding Britain founded in 2015.

The debate between Monbiot and the farming community about the management of Britain's uplands continued. Sometimes there has been progress towards more reliance on natural processes, as for example in the case of Cumbria. In the aftermath of the Storm Desmond floods, which hit in Cumbria in December 2015, there has been a commitment to making use of natural flood control (although the authorities mainly responded to the floods with engineering projects such as constructing raised linear walls and embankments along the River Kent in Kendal). A small deculverting scheme has been trialled in Kendal and upstream measures are planned "to slow the flow of water and provide wider environmental benefits across the catchment". In 2022 a programme to restore and improve rivers in the Lake District won the European Riverprize.

There has been evidence of the National Trust distancing itself from the sheep-centric vision it inherited from past benefactors such as Beatrix Potter. The advocacy group Restore Trust has criticised a number of the National Trust's policies including its plan to restore 250,000 hectares for nature recovery, something which Restore Trust has characterised as excessive and damaging to farming communities, but in 2022 National Trust members rejected a proposal to cease its involvement in rewilding.

== See also ==
- Rewilding (conservation biology)
- Lynx reintroduction in Great Britain
