= Species reintroduction =

Wildlife conservation technique

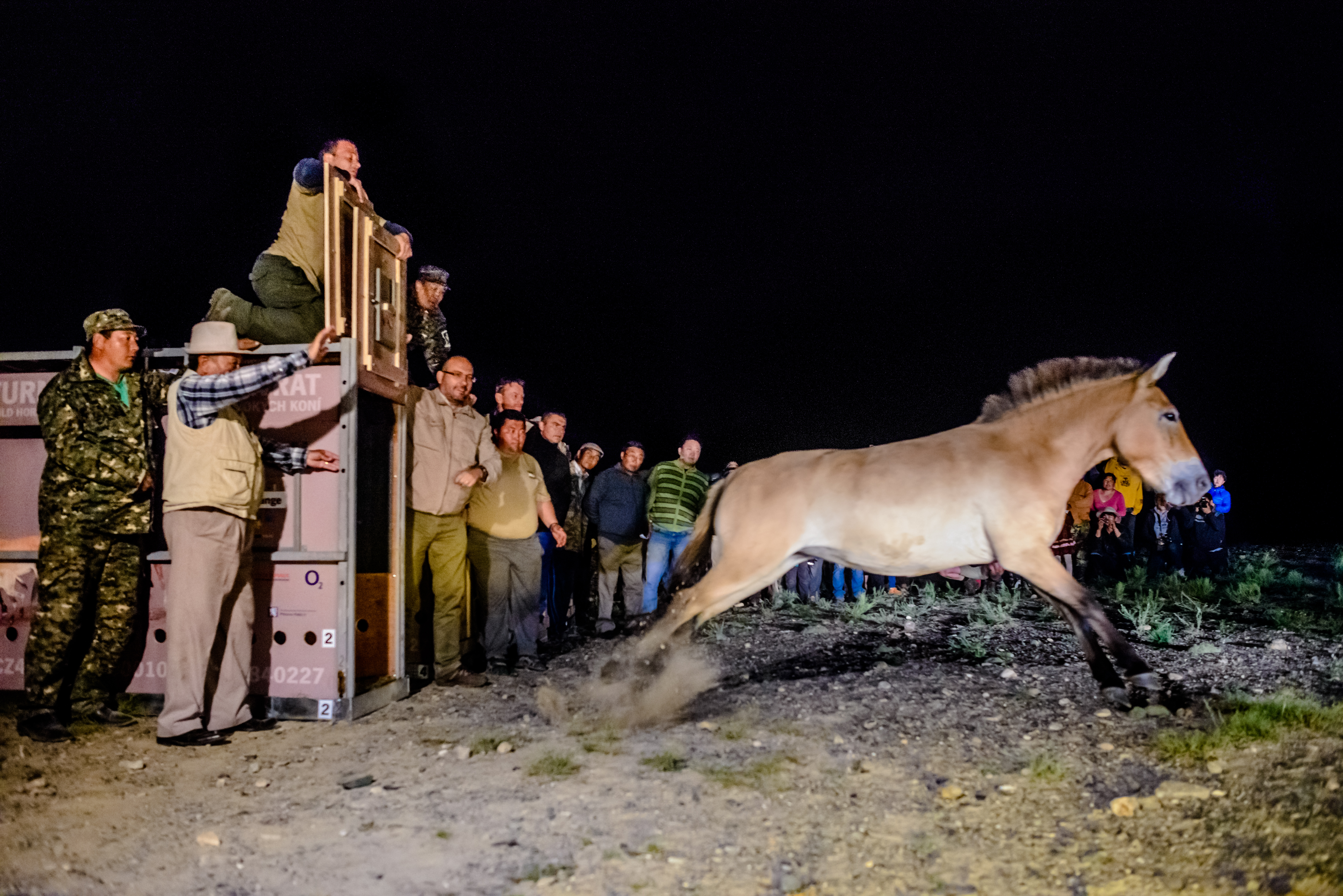
A Przewalski's horse being released into the wild in Mongolia, as part of the Return of the Wild Horses project.

Species reintroduction is the deliberate release of a species into the wild, from captivity or other areas where the organism is capable of survival. The goal of species reintroduction is to establish a healthy, genetically diverse, self-sustaining population to an area where it has been extirpated, or to augment an existing population. Species that may be eligible for reintroduction are typically threatened or endangered in the wild. However, reintroduction of a species can also be for pest control; for example, wolves being reintroduced to a wild area to curb an overpopulation of deer. Because reintroduction may involve returning native species to localities where they had been extirpated, some prefer the term "reestablishment".

Humans have been reintroducing species for food and pest control for thousands of years. However, the practice of reintroducing for conservation is much younger, starting in the 20th century.

== Methods for sourcing individuals ==
There are a variety of approaches to species reintroduction. The optimal strategy will depend on the biology of the organism. The first matter to address when beginning a species reintroduction is whether to source individuals in situ, from wild populations, or ex situ, from captivity in a zoo or botanic garden, for example.

=== In situ sourcing ===
In situ sourcing for restorations involves moving individuals from an existing wild population to a new site where the species was formerly extirpated. Ideally, populations should be sourced in situ when possible due to the numerous risks associated with reintroducing organisms from captive populations to the wild. To ensure that reintroduced populations have the best chance of surviving and reproducing, individuals should be sourced from populations that genetically and ecologically resemble the recipient population. Generally, sourcing from populations with similar environmental conditions to the reintroduction site will maximize the chance that reintroduced individuals are well adapted to the habitat of the reintroduction site otherwise there are possibilities that they will not take to their environment. .

One consideration for in situ sourcing is at which life stage the organisms should be collected, transported, and reintroduced. For instance, with plants, it is often ideal to transport them as seeds as they have the best chance of surviving translocation at this stage. However, some plants are difficult to establish as seed and may need to be translocated as juveniles or adults.

=== Ex situ sourcing ===
In situations where in situ collection of individuals is not feasible, such as for rare and endangered species with too few individuals existing in the wild, ex situ collection is possible. Ex situ collection methods allow storage of individuals that have high potential for reintroduction. Storage examples include germplasm stored in seed banks, sperm and egg banks, cryopreservation, and tissue culture. Methods that allow for storage of a high numbers of individuals also aim to maximize genetic diversity. Stored materials generally have long lifespans in storage, but some species do lose viability when stored as seed. Tissue culture and cryopreservation techniques have only been perfected for a few species.

Organisms may also be kept in living collections in captivity. Living collections are more costly than storing germplasm and hence can support only a fraction of the individuals that ex situ sourcing can. Risk increases when sourcing individuals to add to living collections. Loss of genetic diversity is a concern because fewer individuals stored. Individuals may also become genetically adapted to captivity, which often adversely affects the reproductive fitness of individuals. Adaptation to captivity may make individuals less suitable for reintroduction to the wild. Thus, efforts should be made to replicate wild conditions and minimize time spent in captivity whenever possible.

== Successes and failures ==
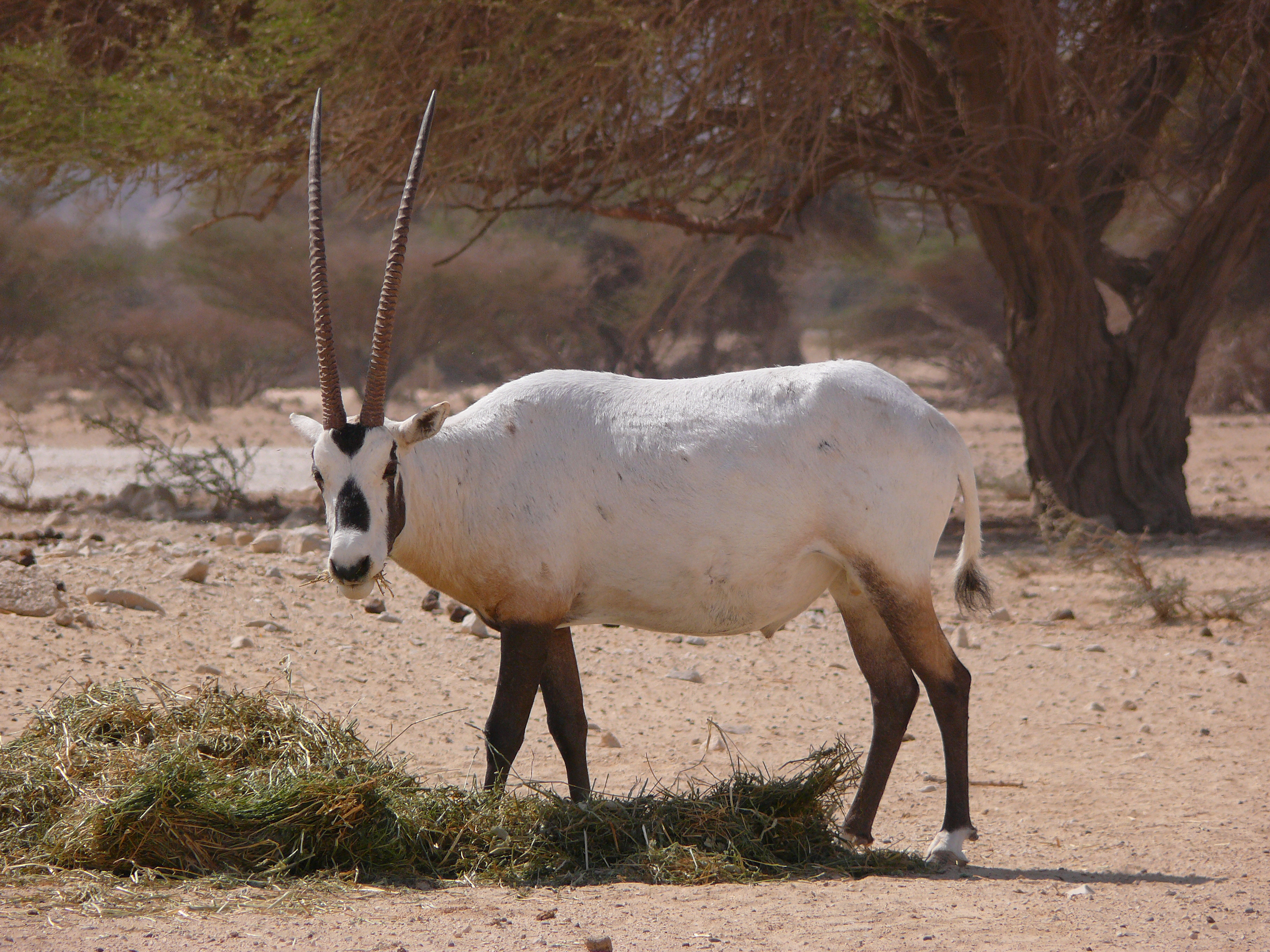
Arabian oryx were reintroduced to Oman and Israel in the 20th century.

Reintroduction biology is a relatively young discipline and continues to be a work in progress. No strict and accepted definition of reintroduction success exists, but it has been proposed that the criteria widely used to assess the conservation status of endangered taxa, such as the IUCN Red List criteria, should be used to assess reintroduction success. Successful reintroduction programs should yield viable and self-sustainable populations in the long-term. The IUCN/SSC Reintroduction Specialist Group & Environment Agency, in their 2011 Global Reintroduction Perspectives, compiled reintroduction case studies from around the world. 184 case studies were reported on a range of species which included invertebrates, fish, amphibians, reptiles, birds, mammals, and plants. Assessments from all of the studies included goals, success indicators, project summary, major difficulties faced, major lessons learned, and success of project with reasons for success or failure. A similar assessment focused solely on plants found high rates of success for rare species reintroductions. An analysis of data from the Center for Plant Conservation International Reintroduction Registry found that, for the 49 cases where data were available, 92% of the reintroduced plant populations survived two years. The Siberian tiger population has rebounded from 40 individuals in the 1940s to around 500 in 2007. The Siberian tiger population is now the largest un-fragmented tiger population in the world. Yet, a high proportion of translocations and reintroductions have not been successful in establishing viable populations. For instance, in China reintroduction of captive Giant Pandas have had mixed effects. The initial pandas released from captivity all died quickly after reintroduction. Even now that they have improved their ability to reintroduce pandas, concern remains over how well the captive-bred pandas will fare with their wild relatives.

Many factors can attribute to the success or failure of a reintroduction. Predators, food, pathogens, competitors, and weather can all affect a reintroduced population's ability to grow, survive, and reproduce. The number of animals reintroduced in an attempt should also vary with factors such as social behavior, expected rates of predation, and density in the wild. Animals raised in captivity may experience stress during captivity or translocation, which can weaken their immune systems. The IUCN reintroduction guidelines emphasize the need for an assessment of the availability of suitable habitat as a key component of reintroduction planning. Poor assessment of the release site can increase the chances that the species will reject the site and perhaps move to a less suitable environment. This can decrease the species fitness and thus decrease chances for survival. They state that restoration of the original habitat and amelioration of causes of extinction must be explored and considered as essential conditions for these projects. Unfortunately, the monitoring period that should follow reintroductions often remains neglected.

== Genetic considerations ==
When a species has been extirpated from a site where it previously existed, individuals that will comprise the reintroduced population must be sourced from wild or captive populations. When sourcing individuals for reintroduction, it is important to consider local adaptation, adaptation to captivity (for ex situ conservation), the possibility of inbreeding depression and outbreeding depression, and taxonomy, ecology, and genetic diversity of the source population. Reintroduced populations experience increased vulnerability to influences of drift, selection, and gene flow evolutionary processes due to their small sizes, climatic and ecological differences between source and native habitats, and presence of other mating-compatible populations.

If the species slated for reintroduction is rare in the wild, it is likely to have unusually low population numbers, and care should be taken to avoid inbreeding and inbreeding depression. Inbreeding can change the frequency of allele distribution in a population, and potentially result in a change to crucial genetic diversity. Additionally, outbreeding depression can occur if a reintroduced population can hybridize with existing populations in the wild, which can result in offspring with reduced fitness, and less adaptation to local conditions. To minimize both, practitioners should source for individuals in a way that captures as much genetic diversity as possible, and attempt to match source site conditions to local site conditions as much as possible.

Capturing as much genetic diversity as possible, measured as heterozygosity, is suggested in species reintroductions. Some protocols suggest sourcing approximately 30 individuals from a population will capture 95% of the genetic diversity. Maintaining genetic diversity in the recipient population is crucial to avoiding the loss of essential local adaptations, minimizing inbreeding depression, and maximizing fitness of the reintroduced population.

=== Ecological similarity ===
Plants or animals that undergo reintroduction may exhibit reduced fitness if they are not sufficiently adapted to local environmental conditions. Therefore, researchers should consider ecological and environmental similarity of source and recipient sites when selecting populations for reintroduction. Environmental factors to consider include climate and soil traits (pH, percent clay, silt and sand, percent combustion carbon, percent combustion nitrogen, concentration of Ca, Na, Mg, P, K). Historically, sourcing plant material for reintroductions has followed the rule "local is best," as the best way to preserve local adaptations, with individuals for reintroductions selected from the most geographically proximate population. However, geographic distance was shown in a common garden experiment to be an insufficient predictor of fitness. Additionally, projected climatic shifts induced by climate change have led to the development of new seed sourcing protocols that aim to source seeds that are best adapted to project climate conditions. Conservation agencies have developed seed transfer zones that serve as guidelines for how far plant material can be transported before it will perform poorly. Seed transfer zones take into account proximity, ecological conditions, and climatic conditions in order to predict how plant performance will vary from one zone to the next. A study of the reintroduction of Castilleja levisecta found that the source populations most physically near the reintroduction site performed the poorest in a field experiment, while those from the source population whose ecological conditions most closely matched the reintroduction site performed best, demonstrating the importance of matching the evolved adaptations of a population to the conditions at the reintroduction site.

=== Adaptation to captivity ===
Some reintroduction programs use plants or animals from captive populations to form a reintroduced population. When reintroducing individuals from a captive population to the wild, there is a risk that they have adapted to captivity due to differential selection of genotypes in captivity versus the wild. The genetic basis of this adaptation is selection of rare, recessive alleles that are deleterious in the wild but preferred in captivity. Consequently, animals adapted to captivity show reduced stress tolerance, increased tameness, and loss of local adaptations. Plants also can show adaptations to captivity through changes in drought tolerance, nutrient requirements, and seed dormancy requirements. Extent of adaptation is directly related to intensity of selection, genetic diversity, effective population size and number of generations in captivity. Characteristics selected for in captivity are overwhelmingly disadvantageous in the wild, so such adaptations can lead to reduced fitness following reintroduction. Reintroduction projects that introduce wild animals generally experience higher success rates than those that use captive-bred animals. Genetic adaptation to captivity can be minimized through management methods: by maximizing generation length and number of new individuals added to the captive population; minimizing effective population size, number of generations spent in captivity, and selection pressure; and reducing genetic diversity by fragmenting the population. For plants, minimizing adaptation to captivity is usually achieved by sourcing plant material from a seed bank, where individuals are preserved as wild-collected seeds, and have not had the chance to adapt to conditions in captivity. However, this method is only plausible for plants with seed dormancy.

=== Genetic trade-offs ===
In reintroductions from captivity, translocation of animals from captivity to the wild has implications for both captive and wild populations. Reintroduction of genetically valuable animals from captivity improves genetic diversity of reintroduced populations while depleting captive populations; conversely, genetically valuable captive-bred animals may be closely related to individuals in the wild and thus increase risk of inbreeding depression if reintroduced. Increasing genetic diversity is favored with removal of genetically overrepresented individuals from captive populations and addition of animals with low genetic relatedness to the wild. However, in practice, initial reintroduction of individuals with low genetic value to the captive population is recommended to allow for genetic assessment before translocation of valuable individuals.

== Improving research techniques ==
A cooperative approach to reintroduction by ecologists and biologists could improve research techniques. For both preparation and monitoring of reintroductions, increasing contacts between academic population biologists and wildlife managers is encouraged within the Survival Species Commission and the IUCN. The IUCN states that a reintroduction requires a multidisciplinary approach involving a team of persons drawn from a variety of backgrounds. A survey by Wolf et al. in 1998 indicated that 64% of reintroduction projects have used subjective opinion to assess habitat quality. This means that most reintroduction evaluation has been based on human anecdotal evidence and not enough has been based on statistical findings. Seddon et al. (2007) suggest that researchers contemplating future reintroductions should specify goals, overall ecological purpose, and inherent technical and biological limitations of a given reintroduction, and planning and evaluation processes should incorporate both experimental and modeling approaches.

Monitoring the health of individuals, as well as the survival, is important; both before and after the reintroduction. Intervention may be necessary if the situation proves unfavorable. Population dynamics models that integrate demographic parameters and behavioral data recorded in the field can lead to simulations and tests of a priori hypotheses. Using previous results to design further decisions and experiments is a central concept of adaptive management. In other words, learning by doing can help in future projects. Population ecologists should therefore collaborate with biologists, ecologists, and wildlife management to improve reintroduction programs.

=== Genetic monitoring ===
For reintroduced populations to successfully establish and maximize reproductive fitness, practitioners should perform genetic tests to select which individuals will be the founders of reintroduced populations and to continue monitoring populations post-reintroduction. A number of methods are available to measure the genetic relatedness between and variation among individuals within populations. Common genetic diversity assessment tools include microsatellite markers, mitochondrial DNA analyses, alloenzymes, and amplified fragment length polymorphism markers. Post-reintroduction, genetic monitoring tools can be used to obtain data such as population abundance, effective population size, and population structure, and can also be used to identify instances of inbreeding within reintroduced populations or hybridization with existing populations that are genetically compatible. Long-term genetic monitoring is recommended post-reintroduction to track changes in genetic diversity of the reintroduced population and determine success of a reintroduction program. Adverse genetic changes such as loss of heterozygosity may indicate management intervention, such as population supplementation, is necessary for survival of the reintroduced population.

== Reintroduction Specialist Group (RSG) ==
The RSG is a network of specialists whose aim is to combat the ongoing and massive loss of biodiversity by using reintroductions as a responsible tool for the management and restoration of biodiversity. It does this by actively developing and promoting sound inter-disciplinary scientific information, policy, and practice to establish viable wild populations in their natural habitats. The role of the RSG is to promote the re-establishment of viable populations in the wild of animals and plants. The need for this role was felt due to the increased demand from reintroduction practitioners, the global conservation community and increase in reintroduction projects worldwide.

Increasing numbers of animal and plant species are becoming rare, or even extinct in the wild. In an attempt to re-establish populations, species can – in some instances – be reintroduced into an area, either through translocation from existing wild populations, or by reintroducing captive-bred animals or artificially propagated plants.

== Reintroduction programs ==
=== Africa ===
- Addax in Morocco and Tunisia, Chad
- African bush elephant into Samara Private Game Reserve in Eastern Cape, South Africa and Nyungwe National Park in Rwanda(planned)
- African leopard into Majete Wildlife Reserve, Malawi
- African spurred tortoise in Senegal
- African wild dog into Gorongosa National Park in Mozambique and Majete Wildlife Reserve in Malawi
- Angolan giraffe into Iona National Park in Angola(successful)
- Black rhinoceros in Malawi, Zambia, Botswana, Rwanda (successful) and Chad (ongoing), Gonarezhou National Park in Zimbabwe, Zinave National Park in Mozambique
- Cape buffalo into Nsumbu National Park in northern Zambia
- Chimpanzee in the Douala-Edea Wildlife Reserve in Cameroon
- Cuvier's gazelle in Jebel Serj National Park, Tunisia
- Dorcas gazelle in Ferlo Nord Wildlife Reserve, Senegal
- Eastern lowland gorilla on Mount Tshiaberimu in Virunga National Park, Democratic Republic of the Congo
- Ground pangolin into the Phinda Private Game Reserve in KwaZulu-Natal, South Africa
- Lion to Akagera National Park of Rwanda and Majete Wildlife Reserve and Liwonde National Park of Malawi
- Mandrill into Lékédi Park, Gabon
- Mhorr gazelle (subspecies of Dama gazelle) into Safia Reserve in Morocco (failure and ongoing) Bou-Hedma National Park in Tunisia and Guembeul Natural Reserve in Senegal
- North African ostrich in Morocco, Nigeria, Niger (planned) and Tunisia (ongoing)
- Plains zebra into Kitulo National Park in southern Tanzania and Nsumbu National Park in northern Zambia
- Reticulated giraffe in Mount Kenya, Kenya
- Scimitar oryx in Chad
- Southern white rhinoceros in Kenya, Uganda, Zambia (successful) and Garamba National Park in Democratic Republic of the Congo, Akagera National Park, Rwanda
- South African cheetah in Eswatini and Malawi (successful)
- Spotted hyena to Zinave National Park and Gorongosa National Park (planned) in Mozambique
- West African crocodile into Morocco
- West African giraffe to Gadabedji Reserve, Niger

=== Asia ===
- Alaska pollock (Myeoungtae) in East Sea near Uljin, North Gyeongsang Province of South Korea
- Amur leopard in Russia (planned)
- Asian elephant into Doi Pha Muang Wildlife Sanctuary, Thailand
- Asian giant tortoise in Bangladesh
- Asiatic Lion Reintroduction Project of Asiatic lion to Kuno Wildlife Sanctuary from their only home presently in the world at Gir Forest National Park. Kuno Wildlife Sanctuary is the chosen site for reintroducing and establishing the world's second completely separate population of the wild free ranging Asiatic lions in the state of Madhya Pradesh. It was decided to reintroduce the Asiatic lion in Kumbhalgarh Wildlife Sanctuary in Rajasthan. Some will be reintroduced in two locations in Gujarat.
- Bengal tiger in Sariska Tiger Reserve of Rajasthan, India
- Blackbuck to Pakistan (ongoing)
- Bornean orangutan in East Kalimantan, Indonesia
- Bactrian deer (subspecies of Central Asian red deer) into Altyn Emel National Park in Kazakhstan and Badai Tugai Nature Reserve in Uzbekistan
- Burmese star tortoise in Myanmar
- Cheetah reintroduction in India is a project to reintroduce the cheetah in India. The Asiatic cheetah became extinct in India in 1947 when Maharaja of Surguja hunted the last three in the state of Rewa in central India. It was officially declared extinct in 1952 by the Indian government. Plans are going on to reintroduce the cheetah to two site in Madhya Pradesh (Kuno Wildlife Sanctuary and Nauradehi Wildlife Sanctuary) and in Rajasthan's Shahgarh Landscape. Cheetahs are being acclimated to Kuno National Park.
- Chinese alligator into Yancheng Biosphere Reserve, Jiangsu Province, China
- Crested ibis at Upo Wetland, South Korea and Sado, Japan
- Gaur into Bandhavgarh National Park in Madhya Pradesh, India
- Formosan sika deer into Kenting National Park, Taiwan
- Gharial at the Hastinapur Wildlife Sanctuary in Uttar Pradesh, India
- Indian rhinoceros to Lal Suhanra National Park, Pakistan (failure) and Dudhwa National Park in India and Jim Corbett National Park (planning)
- Korean doty barbel in the upper part of Geum River, South Korea
- Korean fox (subspecies of red fox) in Sobaeksan National Park, South Korea (ongoing)
- Korean stumpy bullhead into Daegacheon Stream of Seongju County and Gayacheon Stream, Gyeongsan in North Gyeongsang Province, South Korea
- Lar gibbon to Phuket, Thailand
- Long-tailed goral into Woraksan National Park, South Korea
- Magnolia sinica to China
- Oriental stork in South Korea
- Père David's deer in China (successful)
- Persian leopard in European Russia (ongoing)
- Philippine crocodile in the Paghungawan Marsh on Siargao Island, Southwestern Philippine
- Pileated gibbon into the protected forests of the Angkor, Cambodia
- Przewalski's horse in Mongolia, China, and Kazakhstan (ongoing)
- Pygmy hogs into Sonai Rupai Wildlife Sanctuary in Assam, India (successful)
- Saiga antelope at the China(planned)
- Sarus cranes in Thailand (ongoing)
- Short-tailed albatross in Japan (successful)
- Siamese crocodile into Cát Tiên National Park of Vietnam
- Siberian Tiger Introduction Project was proposed in 2009 to reintroduce Siberian tigers back to their former lands and including the former ranges in Central Asia once inhabited by their closest relatives, the Caspian tiger. A rewilding project at the Pleistocene Park, part of the re-population project was proposed back in 2005. Siberian tigers were also proposed to be reintroduced to a suitable habitat near the international river of Amu Darya in Central Asia and near the Ili River delta in Kazakhstan. On July 31, 2026, a female Amur tiger named Umit was released into the Ile-Balkhash State Nature Reserve, with 3 other individuals (a male and 2 cubs) still under observational review for later release. This marked the first wild tiger in Central Asia in over 70 years.
- South China tiger – captive tigers being re-wilded in Laohu Valley Reserve in the Free State province of South Africa under Save China's Tigers programme, will be eventually released back into the wilderness of China.
- Sumatran orangutan at Bukit Tigapuluh National Park in Jambi and Jantho Pine Forest Nature Reserve in Aceh, Sumatra, Indonesia
- Turkmenian kulan in Kazakhstan (ongoing) and Uzbekistan (successful)
- Ussuri black bear (subspecies of Asian black bear) in Jirisan National Park, South Korea (ongoing)
- Water deer in Shanghai, China (successful)
- Wild water buffalo in Chitwan National Park of Nepal and in Kanha National Park of Madhya Pradesh, India

==== Middle East ====
- Arabian gazelle in Saudi Arabia
- Arabian sand gazelle in Saudi Arabia
- Arabian oryx in the Sultanate of Oman (successful), United Arab Emirates (successful), Israel (successful), Saudi Arabia (ongoing), Jordan (ongoing)
- Egyptian vulture in Israel (ongoing)
- Eurasian griffon vulture in Israel (ongoing)
- Houbara bustard in Jordan (ongoing)
- Kurdistan spotted newt in Western Iran (successful)
- Lanner falcon in Israel (successful)
- North African ostrich in Israel (failure) and Saudi Arabia (successful)
- Nubian ibex in Israel (successful), Jordan (successful), Saudi Arabia (ongoing), and Lebanon (ongoing)
- Paper reed in Israel's Hula Valley (successful)
- Persian fallow deer in Israel (successful)
- Persian onager in Saudi Arabia (successful) and Israel (successful)
- Red deer to Armenia - A programme was announced in 2013 to reintroduce the red deer to Armenia. 4 males and 11 females of the species will be purchased and transported to a breeding centre at Dilijan National Park. The World Wildlife Fund Germany and Orange Armenia have provided the funds for the project.
- Roe deer in Israel (ongoing)
- Yarkon bleak fish in Israel (successful)
- Arabian Leopard in Israel (ongoing) Yotvata Hai-Bar Nature Reserve is working on reintroduction.
- Persian Leopard in Israel (ongoing) The Ramat Gan Safari and the Yotvata Hai-Bar Nature Reserve are working on reintroduction.

=== Europe ===
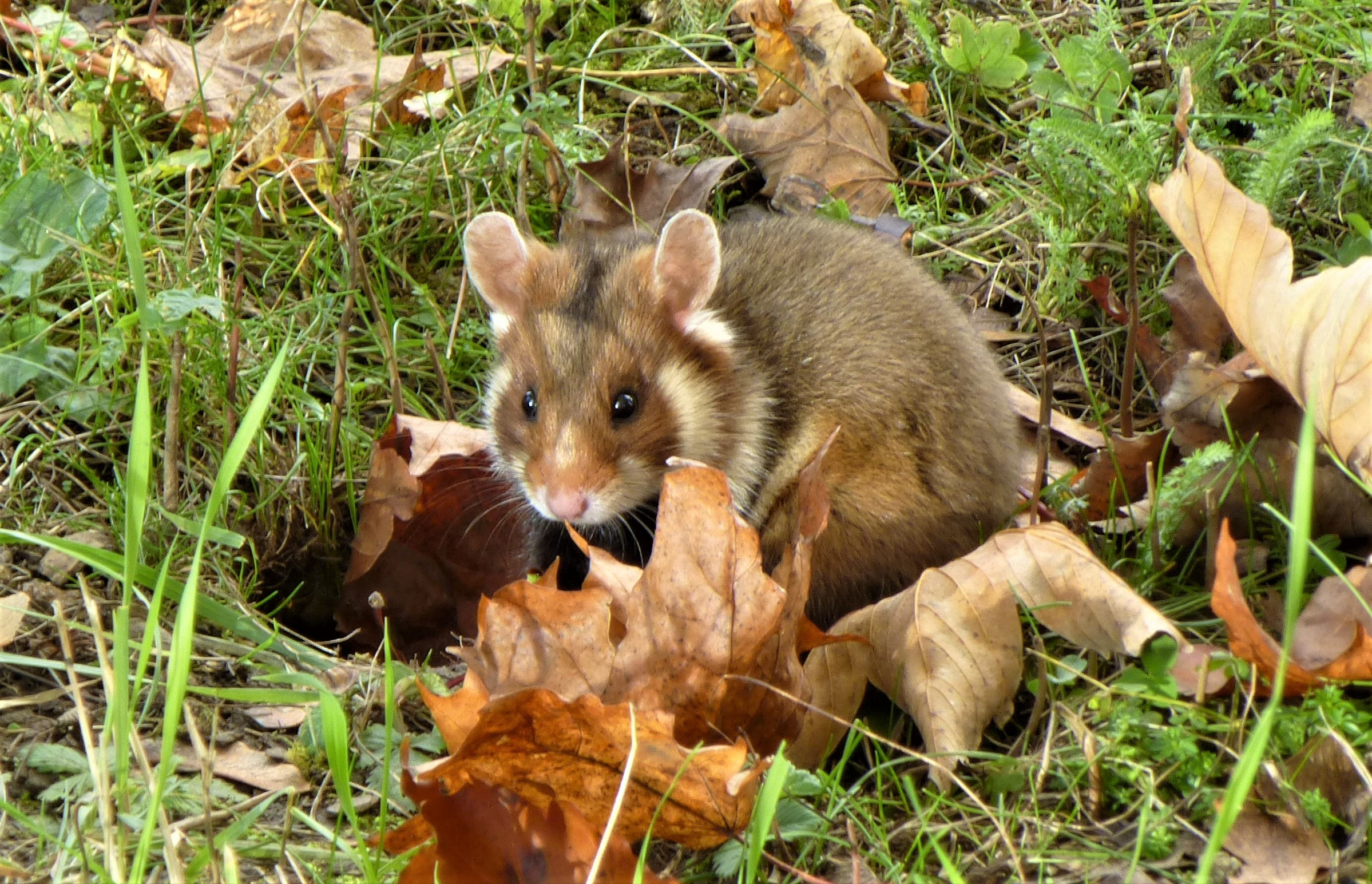
Black-bellied hamster (Cricetus cricetus), also known as European hamster, common hamster

- Alpine ibex in the French, Italian and Swiss Alps (successful)
- Alpine marmot in the Pyrenees, where it had been extirpated at end of the Pleistocene (successful)
- Black-bellied hamster in Netherlands and Belgium (successful)
- Black grouse to Derbyshire, England – (ongoing)
- Chequered skipper butterfly to Northamptonshire, England – (ongoing)
- Common crane to Somerset, England – (ongoing)
- Corncrake to Cambridgeshire, England – (ongoing)
- Eurasian brown bear in the Alps (ongoing) and in the Pyrenees (ongoing)
- Eurasian lynx in Switzerland (successful), the United Kingdom (proposed) and other parts of Europe (ongoing)
- European beaver in several countries in Europe (successful)
- European bison in Poland, Belarus (successful), other parts of Europe including Denmark, Spain, Ukraine, Romania, the UK, and others (ongoing)
- European black vulture in the Massif Central in France – (successful)
- European mink in Estonia and Spain – (ongoing)
- European wildcat in the Devon and Cornwall in England – (ongoing)
- Heath fritillary butterfly to Essex, England– (successful)
- Glanville fritillary butterfly to Somerset, England – (successful)
- Goitered gazelle in protected areas of Vashlovani in Georgia – (ongoing)
- Golden eagle in Ireland (ongoing)
- Great bustard to Salisbury Plain, England – (ongoing)
- Griffon vulture in the Massif Central, France (successful), Central Apennines, Italy, and Northern and Southern Israel (ongoing)
- Iberian lynx in Portugal (ongoing)
- Lammergeier in the Alps (successful) Switzerland (successful)
- Ladybird spider to Arne RSPB reserve in Dorset, England – (ongoing).
- Large blue butterfly in the South West of England – (successful and ongoing)
- Lesser kestrel in Spain
- Lesser white-fronted goose in Sweden and Germany (ongoing)
- Narrow-leaved cudweed in Britain
- Northern bald ibis in Austria, Germany, Italy and Spain (ongoing)
- Northern goshawk – the existing UK population is believed to be derived from a mixture of escaped falconers' birds and deliberate introductions – (successful)
- Osprey to England and Wales – (successful)
- Peregrine falcon in Germany, Poland, Sweden and Norway
- Persian leopard to Caucasus Biosphere Reserve, European Russia
- Pine marten in Wales – (ongoing)
- Przewalski's horse in Ukraine (successful)
- Red kite in Ireland Chiltern Hills, Black Isle, Northamptonshire, Dumfries and Galloway, Yorkshire, Perth and Kinross and Gateshead – (successful), and Spain (ongoing)
- Red squirrel to Anglesey, Wales – (successful and ongoing)
- Russian desman in the Kerzhenskiy State Nature Reserve, Russia
- Scots pine to southern England – (unplanned, successful)
- Scottish wildcat in the Cairngorms National Park, Scotland(Already success)
- Silver-washed fritillary to Essex, England – (ongoing, locally successful)
- Western swamphen in the Mondego River basin, Portugal (successful)
- White stork to France, Sweden, the Netherlands, Belgium, Switzerland (all successful) and England (ongoing)
- White-tailed eagle in Ireland (ongoing) and Hebrides, Scotland – (successful), England (ongoing) and Wales (planned – on hold while a suitable site is found)
- Wild boar to several places in Britain – (accidental, successful)

=== North America ===
- American bison to El Carmen Nature Reserve and Janos Biosphere Reserve in Mexico, American Prairie and many National Parks, Wildlife Refuges, and other public lands in the United States, Banff National Park in Canada (Alberta) (successful)
- American flamingo to Anegada, British Virgin Islands (successful)
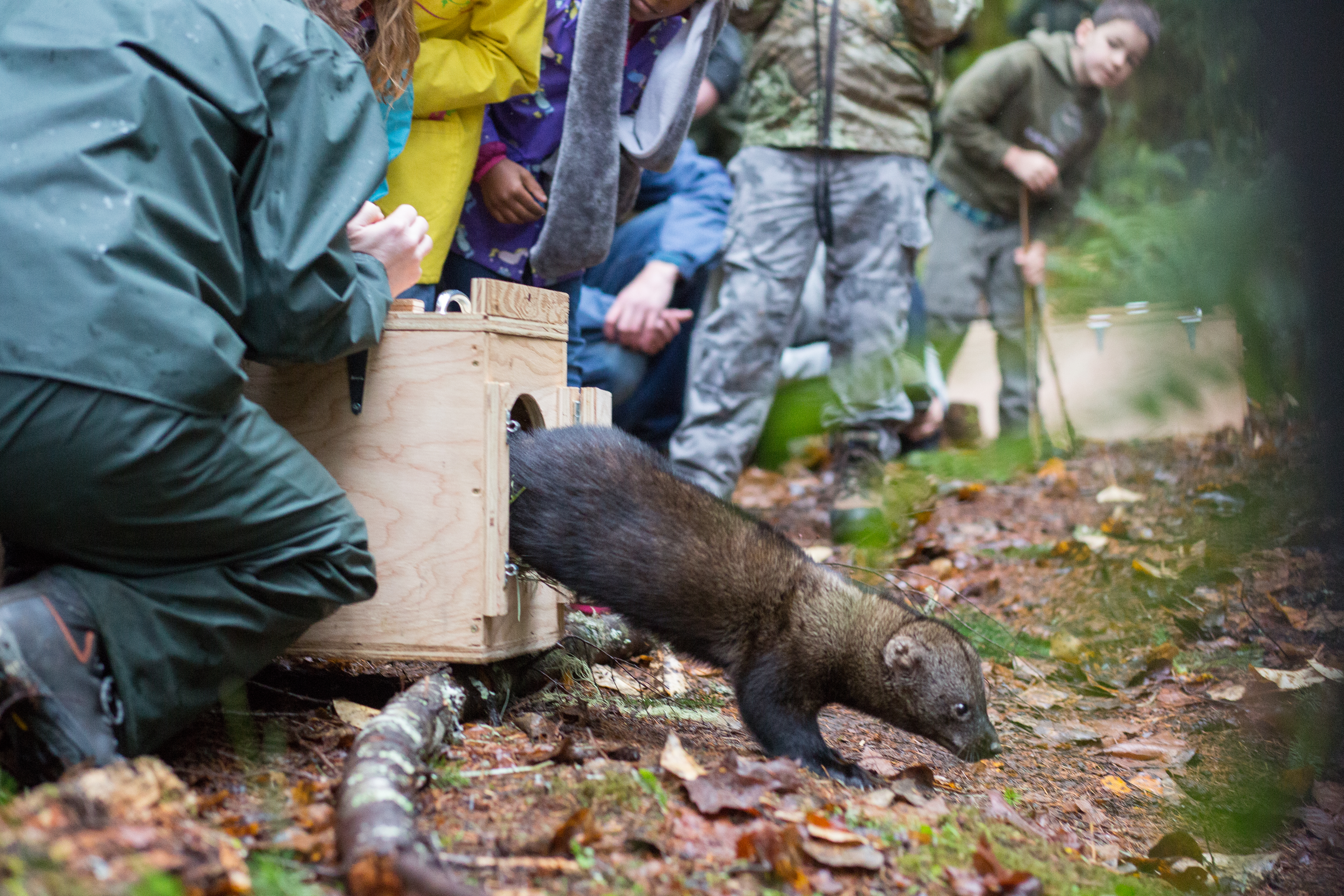
  A fisher leaps from its holding container and darts off into the Gifford Pinchot National Forest.
- Atlantic puffin to Eastern Egg Rock Island, Maine
- Bald eagle to Channel Islands National Park, California
- Black-footed ferret in United States (successful), Canada and Mexico (failure)
- Blanding's turtle in Canada
- Blue-and-yellow macaw to Trinidad (successful)
- California condor in United States (California, Arizona, Utah, Oregon) and Mexico (Baja California) (ongoing)
- Canada lynx to Colorado (successful), New York (failure)
- Chloropyron maritimum in Western United States
- Cougar to Eastern United States (proposed)
- Bighorn sheep in Oregon (successful)
- Black-tailed prairie dog in Arizona and New Mexico (successful)
- Desert pupfish to Organ Pipe Cactus National Monument, Arizona
- Elk to eastern Kentucky, Great Smoky Mountains National Park, Pennsylvania (Allegheny National Forest), Texas (Big Bend National Park), Arizona, New Mexico, North Carolina and Tennessee (all successful) and to New York (failure)
- Fisher in Washington state (successful) (ongoing)
- Geoffroy's spider monkey in Guatemala
- Grey wolf to Yellowstone National Park in Wyoming, Idaho, Montana, California, Oregon, Washington (successful), Colorado (ongoing)
- Yucatán black howler in Belize
- Mexican wolf in United States (Arizona, New Mexico), and Mexico (Sonora, Chihuahua) (ongoing)
- Musk ox in Alaska (successful)
- North American jaguar to Arizona and New Mexico (proposed)
- North American river otter in Missouri (successful)
- Pediocactus knowltonii in New Mexico
- Red wolf in Eastern North Carolina (ongoing), the Gulf Coast (failure), and Great Smoky Mountains National Park (failure)
- Ridgway's hawk to areas in the Dominican Republic where it is extirpated
- Sargent's cherry palm in Florida (successful)
- Scarlet macaw to Palenque, Mexico
- Swift fox in Southern Alberta and Saskatchewan, Canada
- Whooping cranes, including migratory population in the Eastern United States and non-migratory population in Louisiana (ongoing)
- Wild turkey in South Carolina
- West Indian manatee in the Grand Cul-de-Sac Marin Bay, Guadeloupe (failure)
- Wood bison in Alaska

=== Oceans and Oceania ===
- Allocasuarina portuensis in Australia
- Eastern quoll in Australia (ongoing)
- Greater bilby in Arid Recovery Reserve, South Australia and other parts of Australia (successful)
- Kākāpō to Maungatautari, mainland New Zealand (ongoing)
- Komodo dragon to Australia (proposed)
- Nēnē at Hawaiʻi Volcanoes National Park, Hawaii (ongoing)
- North Island robin to Tiritiri Matangi, Auckland, New Zealand
- Numbat in other areas of Western Australia, Scotia Sanctuary (New South Wales), Yookamura Sanctuary (South Australia)
- Ranunculus prasinus in Tasmania
- Rutidosis leptorrhynchoides in Australia
- Takahē into Kahurangi National Park of South Island, New Zealand
- Tasmanian devil in mainland of Australia (ongoing)
- Toromiro to Easter Island
- Woylie in Australia (ongoing)

=== South America ===
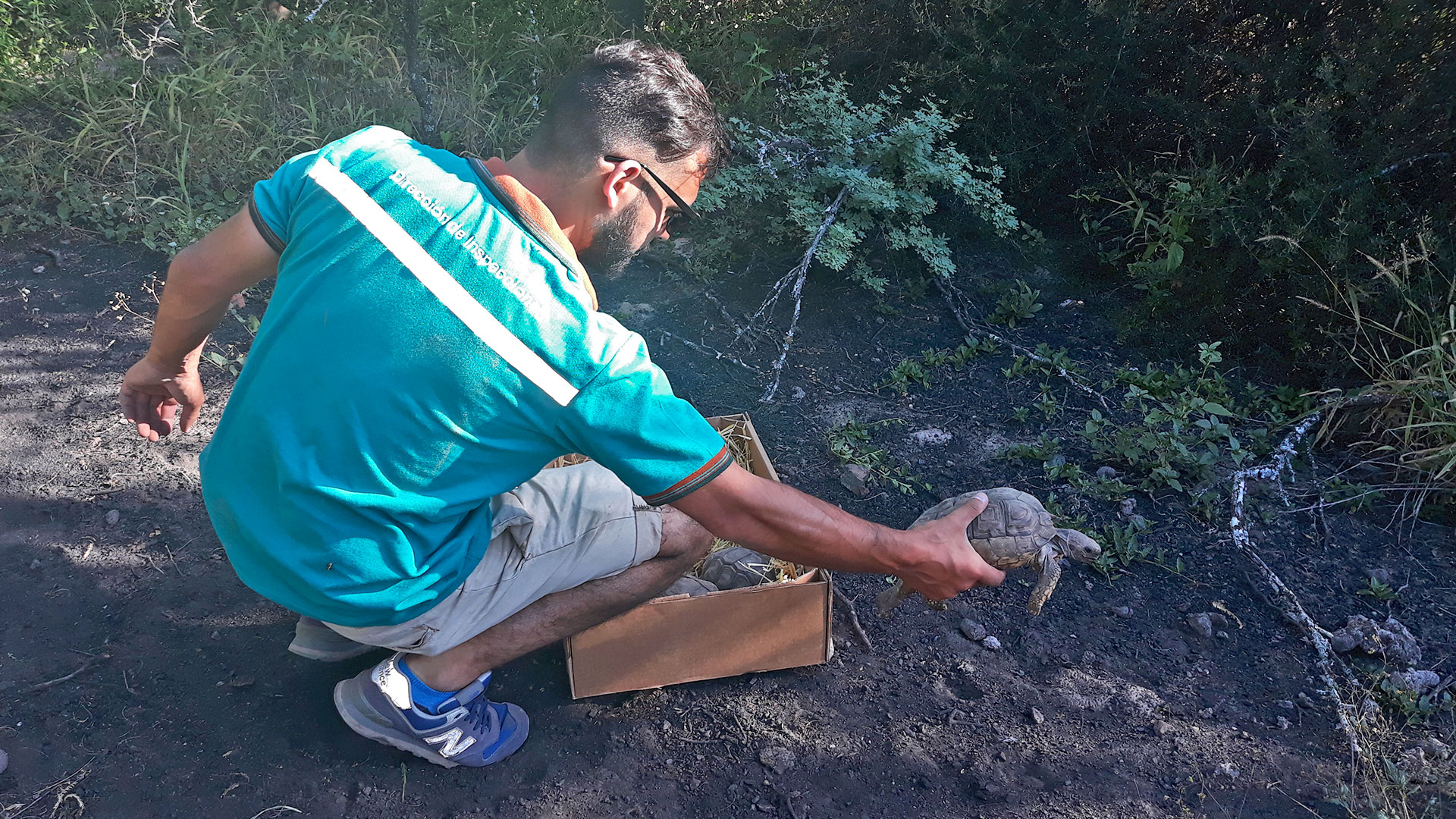
A Chaco tortoise being released into the wild in Santiago del Estero, Argentina.

- Andean condor in Colombia
- Collared peccary in Iberá Provincial Reserve, Argentina
- Giant anteater in Corrientes, Argentina
- Giant otter to Iberá Provincial Reserve, Argentina
- Golden lion tamarin in the Atlantic Forest of Brazil
- Guanaco in central Argentina
- Jaguar into Iberá Wetlands, Argentina
- Orinoco crocodile into Tomo River in El Tuparro National Park, Colombia
- Patagonian huemul into Huilo Huilo Biological Reserve in Chile
- Red-and-green macaw to Iberá Provincial Reserve, Argentina
- South American tapir into Atlantic Forest of Brazil
- Vinaceous-breasted amazon to Parque Nacional das Araucárias, Santa Catarina, Brazil (ongoing)

== See also ==
- De-extinction
- Ecological experiments
- Oostvaardersplassen
- Pleistocene Park
- Pleistocene rewilding
- Reintroduction of wolves
- Rewilding Britain
- Rewilding (conservation biology)
- Rewilding Institute
- Translocation (wildlife conservation)
- Wildlife conservation
- Wildlife management
- World Conservation Union (IUCN)
