= Sea rewilding =

Environmental conservation activity

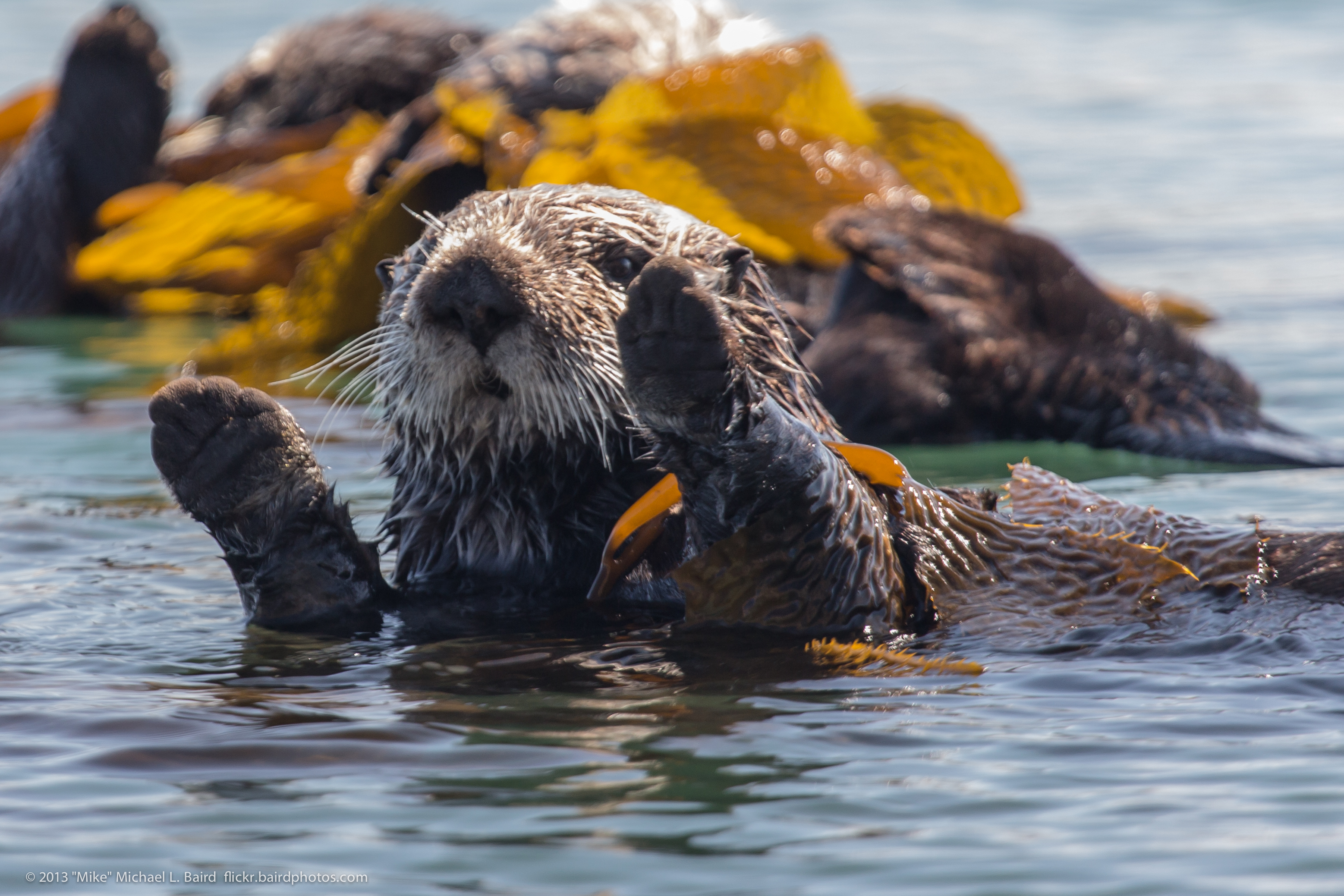
Sea otters are a keystone species needed to control the population of sea urchins which makes their reintroduction to the Pacific coast of Canada a successful case of rewilding.

Sea rewilding (also known as marine rewilding) is an environmental conservation process involving rewilding, restoring organisms and ecosystems to their natural states. Sea rewilding projects have been undertaken throughout the world and have involved efforts to repopulate a wide range of organisms, including giant clams, sharks, skates, sea sturgeons, and many other species. Rewilding marine and coastal ecosystems offer potential ways to mitigate climate change and sequester carbon. Sea rewilding projects are currently less common than those focusing on rewilding land, and seas are under increasing stress from the blue economy – commercial activities which put additional stress on the marine environment. Rewilding projects undertaken near coastal communities can economically benefit local businesses as well as individuals and communities a whole.

== Overview ==
Sea rewilding aims to create conditions where a marine ecosystem is able to recover from prior damage and stressors so that it may thrive independently over time. Activities to facilitate this process include species reintroduction and replenishing, i.e. of oysters, kelp, and seagrass beds. Sea rewilding aids in combating the climate crisis by capturing carbon dioxide, supporting local economies with ecotourism, reversing biodiversity loss, and improving health and well being by providing restored natural landscapes, clean air, water, and healthy soil.

== Current projects ==
=== Seagrass ===
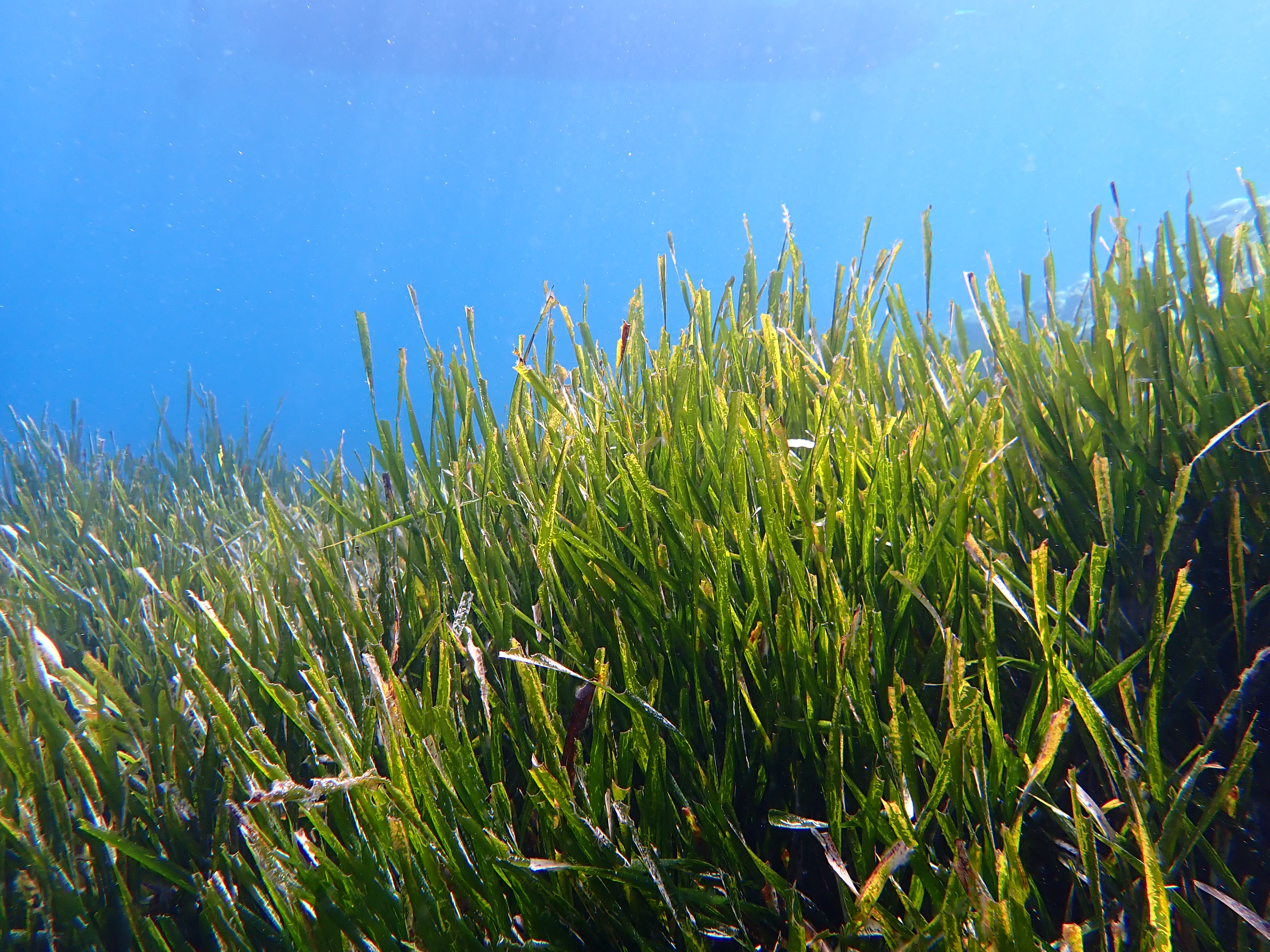
Seagrass at La Ciotat, France

Seagrass meadows store carbon dioxide. More than 90% of the United Kingdom's historic seagrass meadows have been lost since the 1930s. Restoring meadows could offset carbon emissions and provide habitat for numerous fish and shellfish species. Research into seagrass, which covers about one percent of the sea floor suggests that it may be delivering 15–18% of carbon storage in the ocean. Meadows have been declining since the 1930s and are being lost at an alarming rate. Due to their scarcity they have been designated a UK habitat of principal importance. In the United States, a project at Chesapeake Bay is considered a success.

=== Native oysters ===
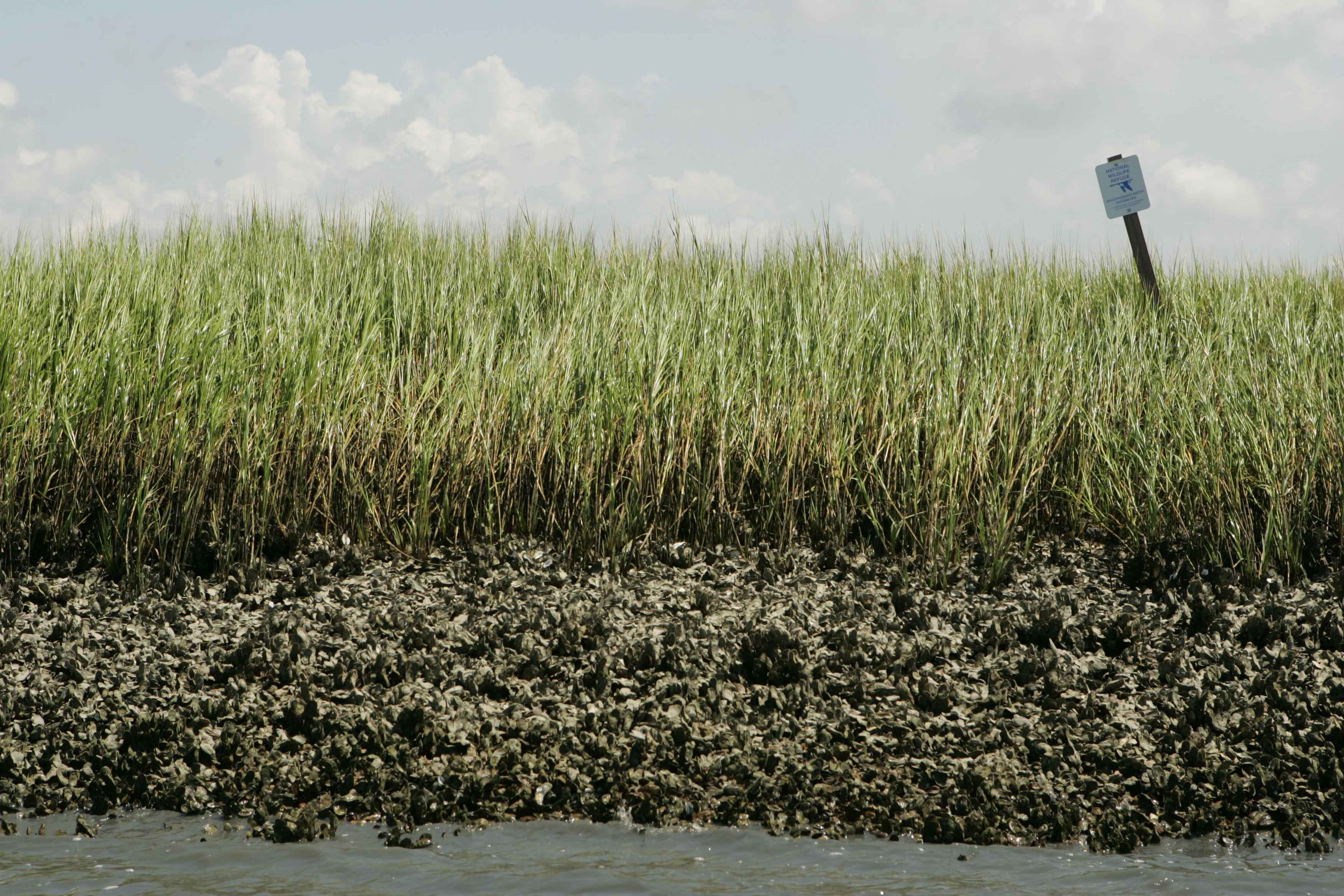
Oyster beds

Oysters filter water, recycle nutrients and help to protect against coastal erosion. Oyster stocks have declined by 95 per cent in Europe due to over-harvesting, habitat loss, pollution and disease.

In Rhode Island, US, "wild oyster populations are at an all-time low", according to Eric Schneider, the principal marine biologist with the Rhode Island Department of Environmental Management's Division of Marine Fisheries. He also states that "oysters provide a number of essential ecosystem services, from water filtration to fish habitat and shoreline protection. By having oyster reef habitat absent from these systems, those services can be significantly depressed."

It has been demonstrated that restoring historic oyster beds improves water quality.

=== Kelp forests ===
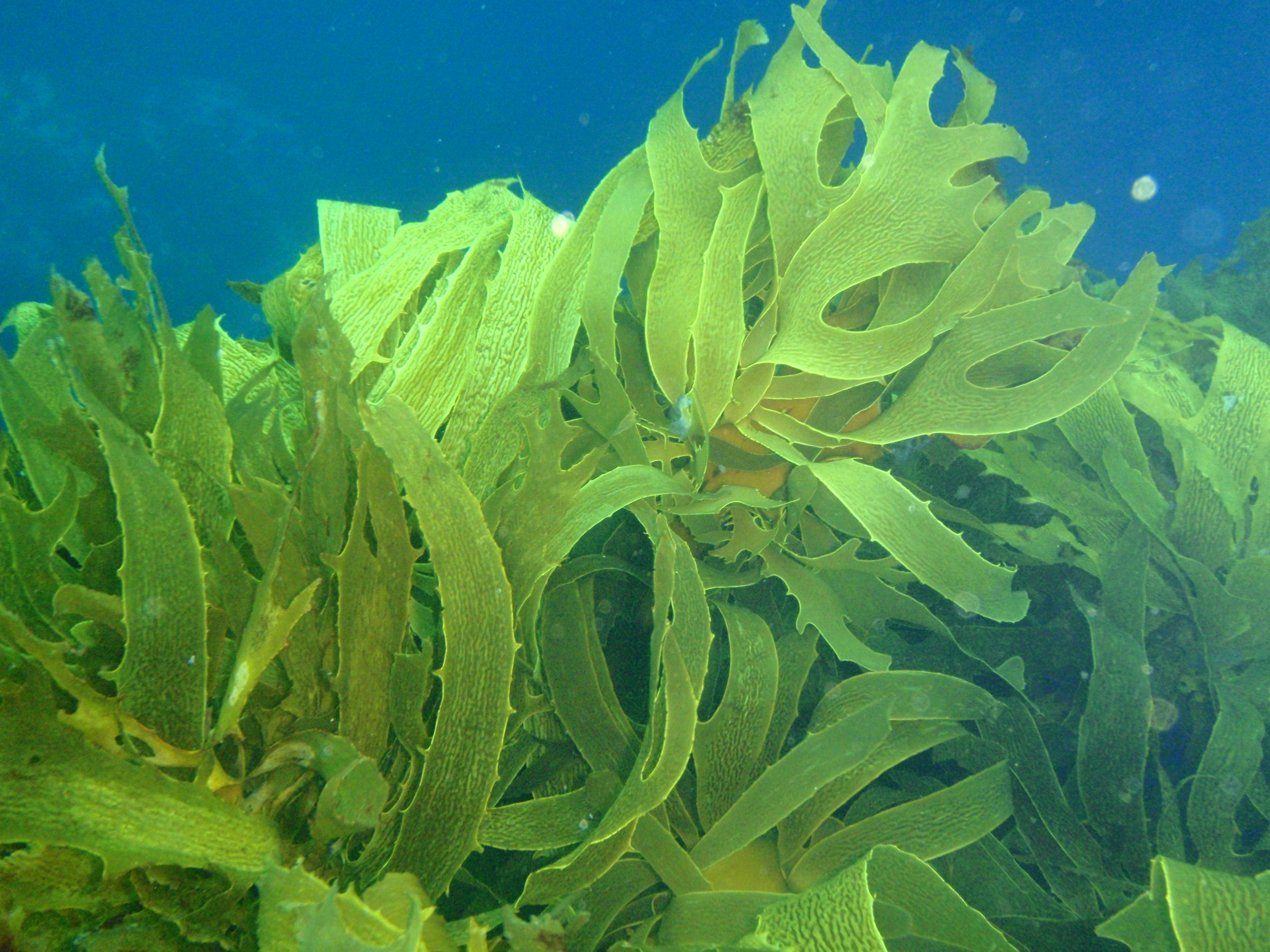
Kelp forest at the Taranga pinnacles of the Hen and Chicken Islands, New Zealand

Kelp forests are important habitats which have been lost over time in coastal waters. Kelp forests provide habitat for fish, protect coastlines from erosion and trap carbon dioxide from the ocean. They grow quickly and absorb large amounts of carbon. Restoring kelp forests is a strategy to address climate change and enrich ocean species.

== Marine protected areas ==
Marine protected areas are areas protected from certain human activities. They are used to preserve and conserve areas where marine life has been disrupted or disturbed. Such disturbances could be overfishing, ocean pollution, and other similar disturbances.

In Chile, environmental groups such as Rewilding Chile are campaigning to create new protected areas.

In China, the Huidong Sea Turtle National Reserve opened the country's first sea turtle rewilding facility.

== Carbon capture ==
Rewilding the sea has been described as "the new way to capture carbon".

== Organizations ==
- Project Seagrass
- Seawilding, a Scottish charity work with communities
- NatureScot
- Rewilding Britain
- COAST
- The Bay Foundation

== See also ==
- Rewilding
- Salmon conservation
- Blue carbon
- Reef burials
- Trophic cascade
- Biomanipulation
