= Reed Noss =

Conservation biologist

Reed F. Noss (born 23 June 1952), a conservation biologist since the beginning of the field in the early 1980s, is a researcher, writer, photographer, and speaker. He is the Conservation Science Coordinator for the Center for Landscape Conservation Planning at the University of Florida, where he also serves as Courtesy Professor in the Department of Wildlife Ecology and Conservation. He retired in 2017 as Provost's Distinguished Research Professor, Pegasus Professor, and Davis-Shine Professor at the University of Central Florida. He is Chief Science Advisor for the Southeastern Grasslands Institute and Chief Science Advisor for the Endangered Ecosystems Alliance. Noss' published work consists of nearly 400 published or in press scientific articles, book chapters, and major reports and nine published books, with a tenth book in review.

== Education ==
Noss has a B.S. in Education from the University of Dayton, a M.S. in Ecology from the University of Tennessee, and a Ph.D. in Wildlife Ecology from the University of Florida. Noss earned his Ph.D. in the Department of Wildlife and Range Sciences in the school of Forest Resources and Conservation at the University of Florida in 1988 under the co-advisory of Larry D. Harris and Ronald L. Labisky and completed his dissertation: Effects of edge and internal patchiness on habitat use by birds in a Florida hardwood forest.

== Career ==
Noss has put in over 40 years of work in developing the ideas of conservation biology and has become an important figure in conservation planning and management as well as his work promoting naturalist education. Noss has been the Editor-in-Chief of the journal Conservation Biology (1993-1997), President of the Society for Conservation Biology (1999-2001), President of the North America Section of the Society for Conservation Biology (2006-2008), Governor-appointed member to the State of Florida’s Acquisition and Restoration Council (2006-2007), and the Vice Chair of the Adaptation for Climate-Sensitive Ecosystems and Resources Advisory Committee at the Climate Change Science Program (2007-2009).

Noss was professor of conservation biology and ecology, as well as the Director of Science and Planning in Conservation Ecology Laboratory at the University of Central Florida. His work encompasses the science of species and ecosystem vulnerability to sea-level rise, disturbance ecology, climate adaptation strategies, and ecosystem conservation and restoration.

Noss has testified three times before U.S. congressional committees, most recently to the House Committee on Natural Resources Oversight Hearing on “Defining Species Conservation Success: Tribal, State and Local Stewardship vs. Federal Courtroom Battles and Sue-and-Settle Practices,” on June 4, 2013.

== Works ==
Books written or edited by Noss:

- Regional Landscape Conservation Planning: Wildlife, Connectivity, and the Florida Model. (2026) ISBN 9781683406549
- Fire Ecology of Florida and the Southeastern Coastal Plain. (2018) ISBN 9780813056715
- Forgotten Grasslands of the South: Natural History and Conservation (2012) ISBN 9781597264884
- Land of Fire and Water: The Florida Dry Prairie Ecosystem. Proceedings of the Florida Dry Prairie Conference Editor.(2006) HOLLIS Number: 012197682
- Large Mammal Restoration: Ecological and Sociological Challenges for the 21st Century Editor. (2001) ISBN 1597262757
- The Redwood Forest: History, Ecology, and Conservation of the Coast Redwoods Editor. (2000) ISBN 9781559637268 Noss, Reed F. (1999-10-01). 1999 edition. Island Press. ISBN 9781610913386; pbk
- Ecological Integrity: Integrating Environment, Conservation, and Health Editor. (2000) ISBN 1559638079
- The Science of Conservation Planning: Habitat Conservation under the Endangered Species Act (1997) ISBN 1559635673
- Saving Nature's Legacy: Protecting and Restoring Biodiversity (1994) ISBN 1559632488

== Recognition ==
List of awards, elections, and special recognitions:

- Conservation Legacy Award. Conservation Florida and Lightsey Cattle Company (2026)
- Herbert W. Kale, II Award. The Wildlife Society, Florida Chapter (2020)
- George B. Fell Award, Natural Areas Association (2019)
- Keiser Distinguished Lecturer, Ohio Northern University (2014)
- Pegasus Professor, University of Central Florida (2014)
- Benton H. Box Award of the George B. Hartzog, Jr. Environmental Awards Program (2012)
- Conservation Leadership Award, Wilburforce Foundation (2010)
- (Thomson Scientific) Top 500 most highly cited authors in all fields, 1993-2003 review decade (recognized in 2006)
- Wildlife Publications Award, Outstanding Edited Book Category, The Wildlife Society (2002)
- Elected Fellow, American Association for the Advancement of Science (2001–present)
- Elected Scientific Fellow, Wildlife Conservation Society (1999–present)
- Edward T. LaRoe III Memorial Award, Society for Conservation Biology (1995)
- Environmental Publication Award, National Wildlife Federation (1988)

== Impacts on conservation biology ==
Noss has been publishing on conservation biology since the early 1980s, shortly after the first texts that used the name appeared. He is especially well known for his work developing concepts and approaches for regional and continental-scale conservation planning and reserve network design. By the late 1990s, he was collaborating with conservation biologist, Michael E. Soulé to refine the conservation idea of rewilding. According to their paper "Rewilding and Biodiversity: Complementary Goals for Continental Conservation" Soulé and Noss identified the driving factors of rewilding as "cores, corridors, and carnivores".

In more recent decades, Noss has spoken about the decline of educational opportunities in natural history, and the diminishing exposure that students have to it.
