= Shahgarh Landscape =

Shahgarh Landscape or Shahgarh Bulge Landscape is located in Jaisalmer District in Indian state of Rajasthan. This area is protected area for reintroduction of cheetah. The nearest city to this area is Jaiselmer. This area fences along the Indo - Pak border. This area is about 4000 km^{2} and has about 80 human settlements each having about 5 - 10 houses. Chinkara will be the primary prey for cheetah as the prey diversity is less in this region. Cheetah have been declared extinct in India in 1952.
