= Rewilding Institute =

Environmental organization focused on landscape-scale conservation and rewilding

The Rewilding Institute
- Founder: Dave Foreman
- Type: Nonprofit organization
- Purpose: Wildlife and landscape-scale conservation
- Region served: North America

The Rewilding Institute is an organization concerned with the integration of traditional wildlife and wildlands conservation to advance landscape-scale conservation. It was founded by environmental activist Dave Foreman.

== About ==
The Rewilding Institute's mission is to work toward the survival and flourishing of large carnivores in North America by promoting the establishment of suitable habitats in the wilderness, which are permanently interconnected as to allow their natural movement. They believe that humans and large carnivores can and should co-exist in North America. They wish to undo the damage done by over-hunting, over-logging, and exploitation of natural resources. Through continent-scale conservation efforts, they hope to prevent further extinctions of large predators, and to restore them to their function of maintaining the ecological balance of animal life in the wild. They have proposed reestablishing wild populations of wolves in interconnected, protected habitats, so that they can resume their ecological role. As part of their program, they have worked to get wildlife crossings included in interstate highway projects.

== See also ==
- Rewilding Britain
