= Rewilding Britain =

British charitable environmental organization

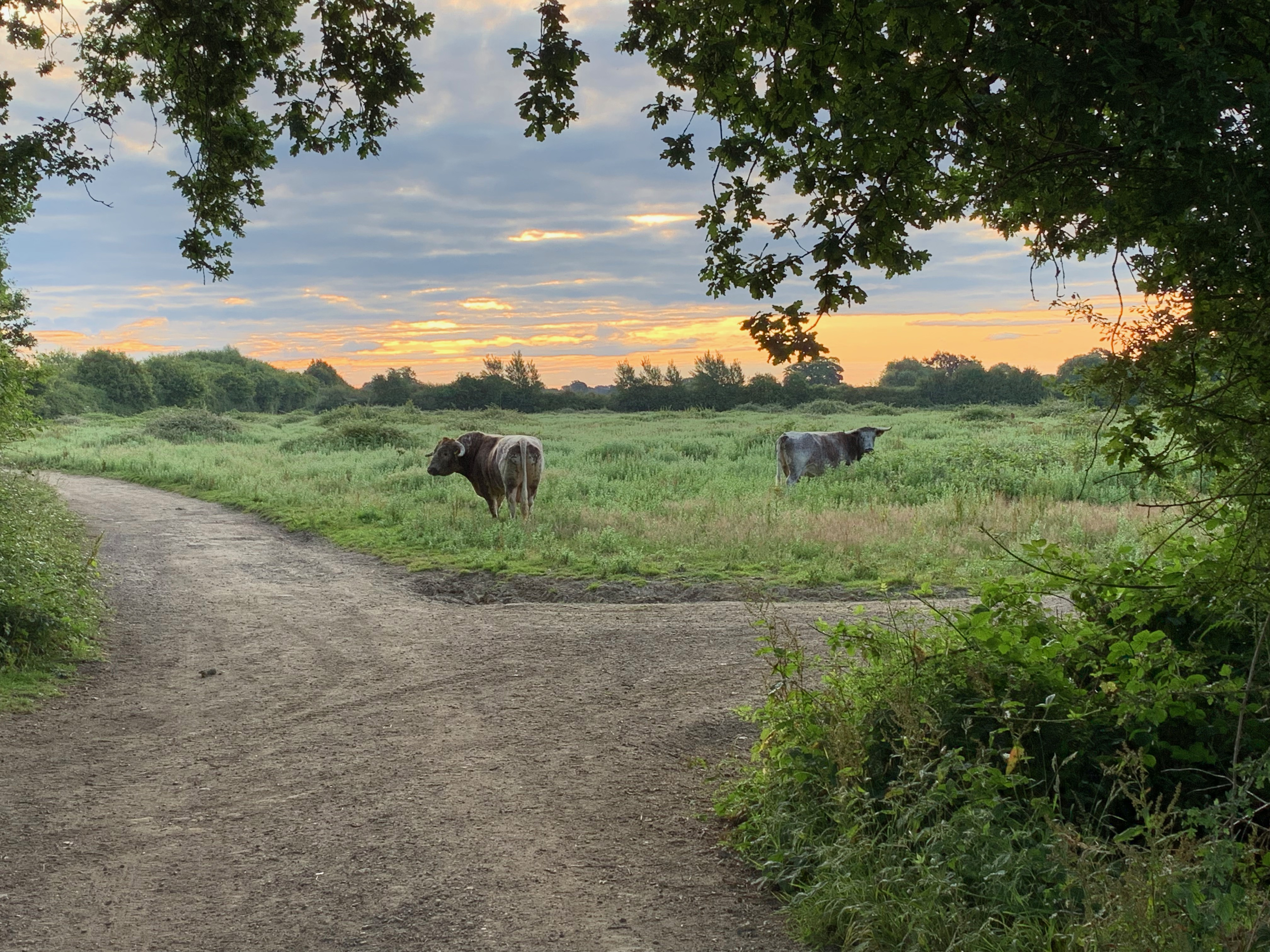
Longhorn cattle at Knepp Wildland

Rewilding Britain is an organisation founded in 2015 that aims to promote the rewilding of Great Britain. It is a registered charity in England, Wales and Scotland.

== History ==
One of the people involved in setting up the charity was Guardian journalist and author George Monbiot who published Feral, a book about rewilding, in 2013. Rewilding Britain has called for the reintroduction of predators such as lynx and wolves which were hunted to extinction in Britain centuries ago. Its proposals have been often opposed by farmers.

In 2018 the Prime Minister, Theresa May, launched a 25-year environmental plan which gave encouragement to Rewilding Britain by, for example, supporting the reintroduction of the beaver and recognising the pioneering achievements of the Knepp Wildland in lowland rewilding.

In 2020, Rewilding Britain called for natural regeneration to be incentivised by the future Environmental Land Management Scheme and to be made the default approach to woodland creation unless trees are unable to establish or would take too long to arrive.

== See also ==
- Rewilding Europe
- Rewilding Institute
- Species reintroduction
- Passive rewilding
