= Eurasian lynx reintroduction in Great Britain =

Possible reintroduction of wild species

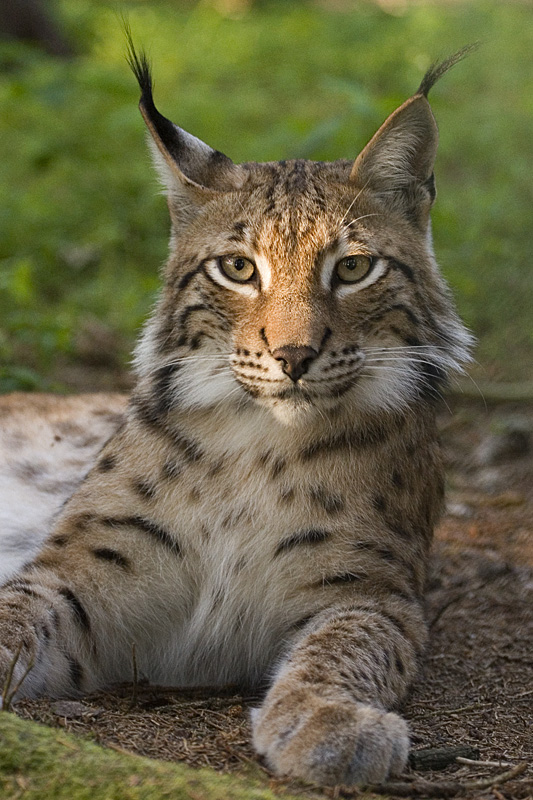
Eurasian lynx

The Eurasian lynx is the target of ongoing species reintroduction proposals in Great Britain. Proposed locations include the Scottish Highlands and Kielder Forest in Northumberland, England.

== Background ==
Lynx are currently extinct in Great Britain, although the date of their extinction is not known with certainty. The youngest physical remains of Lynx, from Kinsey Cave in Craven, have been carbon-dated to between 150 CE and 600 CE. A literary reference to what are probably lynx in Cumbria, dating to between the seventh and the tenth centuries, occurs in the Welsh poem Dinogad's Smock, suggesting they may not have been extirpated from the island of Great Britain until the Middle Ages. A written record indicating the presence of a large cat in southern Scotland in the mid 18th century is noted by scholar Lee Raye, who tentatively argues that it may refer to a late-surviving population of lynx. Since the extinction of the grey wolf from Britain in 1680 (see wolves in Great Britain), the island contains no terrestrial apex predators.

In the post-apex predator period, red and roe deer populations have increased dramatically due to having no natural predators; with excessive deer foraging leading to prevention of forest regeneration, the stripping of tree vegetation, and removing of the shrub layer in forests, which provides a habitat for birds such as nightingales and willow warblers. Reintroducing large predators such as the lynx are seen by rewilding experts as a means of restoring balance in the ecosystem and keeping deer numbers under control.

== Proposals ==
=== England ===
The Missing Lynx Project is a partnership between The Lifescape Project, Northumberland Wildlife Trust and The Wildlife Trusts which aims to reintroduce lynx to Northumberland and the bordering areas of Cumbria and southern Scotland if a population is viable and if it has local support. Research shows that a population of lynx could thrive in the region and a year-long social consultation has found that a majority (72%) of respondents in the project area favour a local lynx reintroduction. The Missing Lynx Project is now working with farmers and other local inhabitants to develop a management plan that can be taken forward before applying for a license to reintroduce any animals.

A separate organisation, Lynx Trust UK are a registered charity campaigning for the reintroduction of lynx to the Kielder Forest in Northumberland. In 2018, a proposal to release six animals was turned down by then-Environment Secretary Michael Gove, due to findings that the proposal did not "meet the necessary standards set out in the IUCN (International Union for Conservation of Nature) guidelines and fails to give confidence that the project could be completed in practical terms or that the outputs would meet the stated aims". In 2020 the Trust began preparing a second proposal to be submitted, with three animals proposed.

The Wild East Project has proposed lynx reintroduction to areas of East Anglia.

=== Scotland ===
Lynx reintroduction into the Scottish Highlands has been proposed since 2008, and a study by Lynx Trust UK and the University of Lancaster found that the Scottish countryside would be able to support a population of up to 250 animals. In 2020, Lynx Trust UK began a consultation into releasing lynx into the Queen Elizabeth Forest Park north of Glasgow.

In January 2025, two lynx were illegally released near Kingussie, roaming for several hours before capture overnight by the Royal Zoological Society of Scotland. The release was condemned by the charity as "highly irresponsible" and their survival in the wild was viewed as "very unlikely". Two further lynx - believed to be from the same family group - were later spotted in the area and then subsequently captured. It was reported that the animals appeared to want to be rescued and were "looking for their food on a plate". One of the lynx later died after being captured.

== Support ==
The proposals have met opposition from sheep farmers, citing threats the lynx would pose to their flocks; despite research indicating that because lynx also predate on foxes, the number of lambs killed would reduce.

Tony Juniper, chairman of Natural England, voiced his support for the "inspiring" proposal in 2020, stating that it could help to cut deer numbers. Scottish rewilding charity Trees for Life supports lynx reintroduction, claiming it would "restore ecological processes that have been missing for centuries, and provide a free and efficient deer management service".

== See also ==
- List of extinct animals of the British Isles
