= Wilding: The Return of Nature to a British Farm =

2018 book by Isabella Tree

- Author: Isabella Tree
- Subject: Nature conservation
- Publisher: Pan Macmillan, Picador
- Publication date: 2018
- Publication place: England
- Pages: 362

Wilding: The Return of Nature to a British Farm is a 2018 non-fiction book on nature conservation by Isabella Tree. It has won the 2018 Richard Jefferies Society Literature Award and the 2023 Zoological Society of London Silver Medal. The book has been welcomed by critics.

The book describes the Knepp Wildland rewilding project on an estate in Sussex that had been run as a farm. The poor land made farming difficult, and the farm was failing. In 2001 the project began; farming ceased, and gradually fallow deer, English Longhorn cattle, and Tamworth pigs were introduced to fenced areas. Birds, insects, and flowers reappeared as scrub developed and the land changed into wood pasture. Broader conservation issues are discussed in the context of the project.

== Book ==
=== Synopsis ===
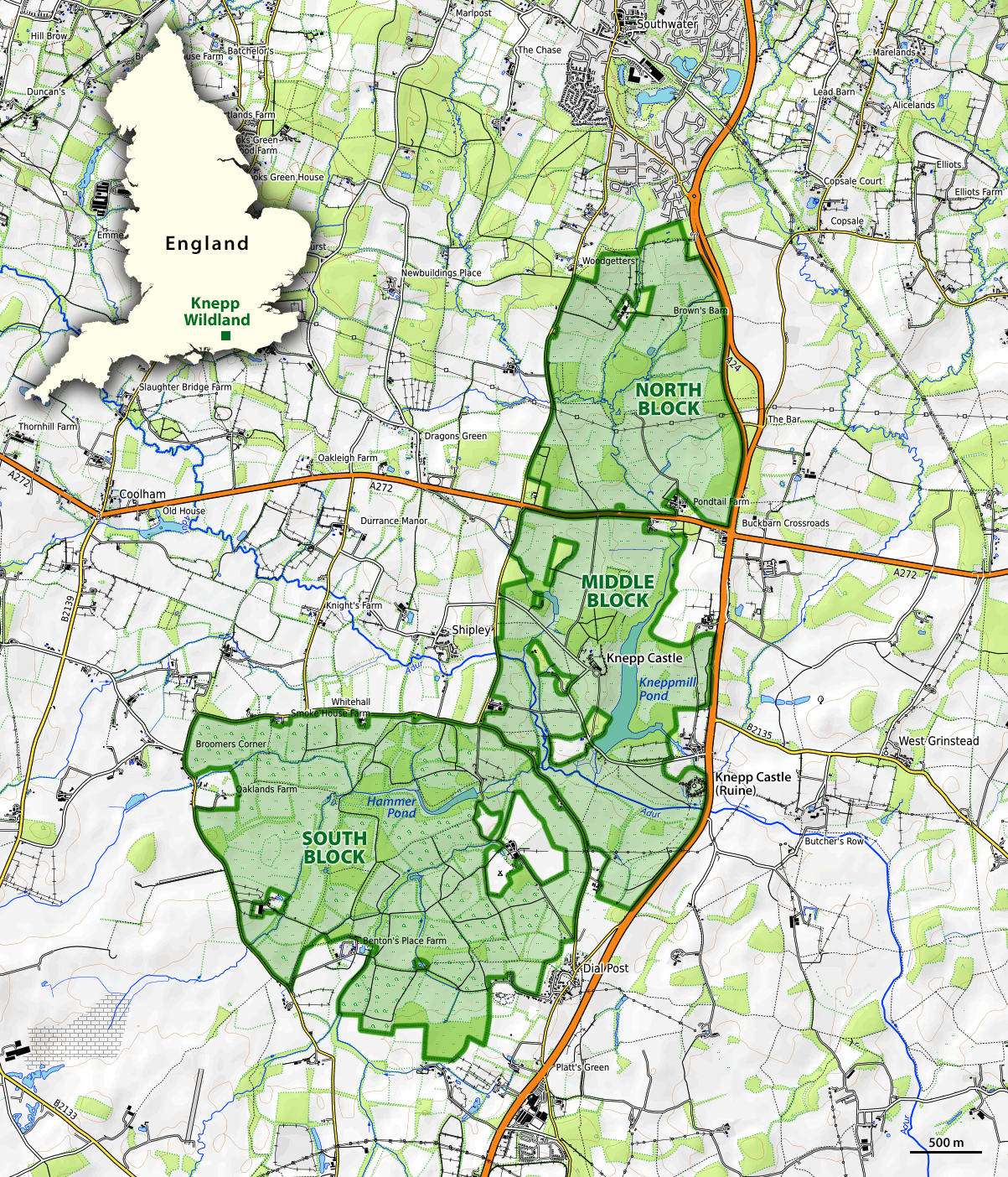
Map of Knepp Wildland in West Sussex, England

In Wilding, Isabella Tree makes the case for the creation of Knepp Wildland, the first large-scale rewilding project in lowland England. The 3,500-acre (1,400-hectare) wildland project was created in the grounds of Knepp Castle, the ancestral home of her husband, Sir Charles Burrell. Tree describes how the estate, farmed conventionally on poor land with heavy soil, started to fail, and they decided to stop farming. Inspired by experts such as the arboriculturalist Ted Green, they began to consider the value of the soil and ancient trees like Knepp's veteran oaks. At the same time, Tree discusses the issues more generally, in this case soil degradation by industrial agriculture with chemical fertilisers. They found that subsidies were available, with constraints, for land not in production, and the land began to return to wood pasture with the growth of scrub. They introduced fallow deer, English Longhorn cattle, and Tamworth pigs to various parts of the estate; each species turned out to feed differently, and to have important, even keystone species effects on the land. Many species of butterfly, dragonfly, and bat returned. Once common birds that had become rare in Britain like nightingales and turtle doves came to breed. Exmoor ponies were added, further diversifying the habitats. Plants and insects flourished, including some like ragwort that were deprecated by landowners. The artificially straightened river Adur was re-engineered to allow it to meander and flood, bringing wading birds like green sandpipers and lapwings back to the farm. The pasture-fed beef turned out to be a valuable and nutritious commodity, while the rewilded estate started to make money from tourists and wildlife watchers.

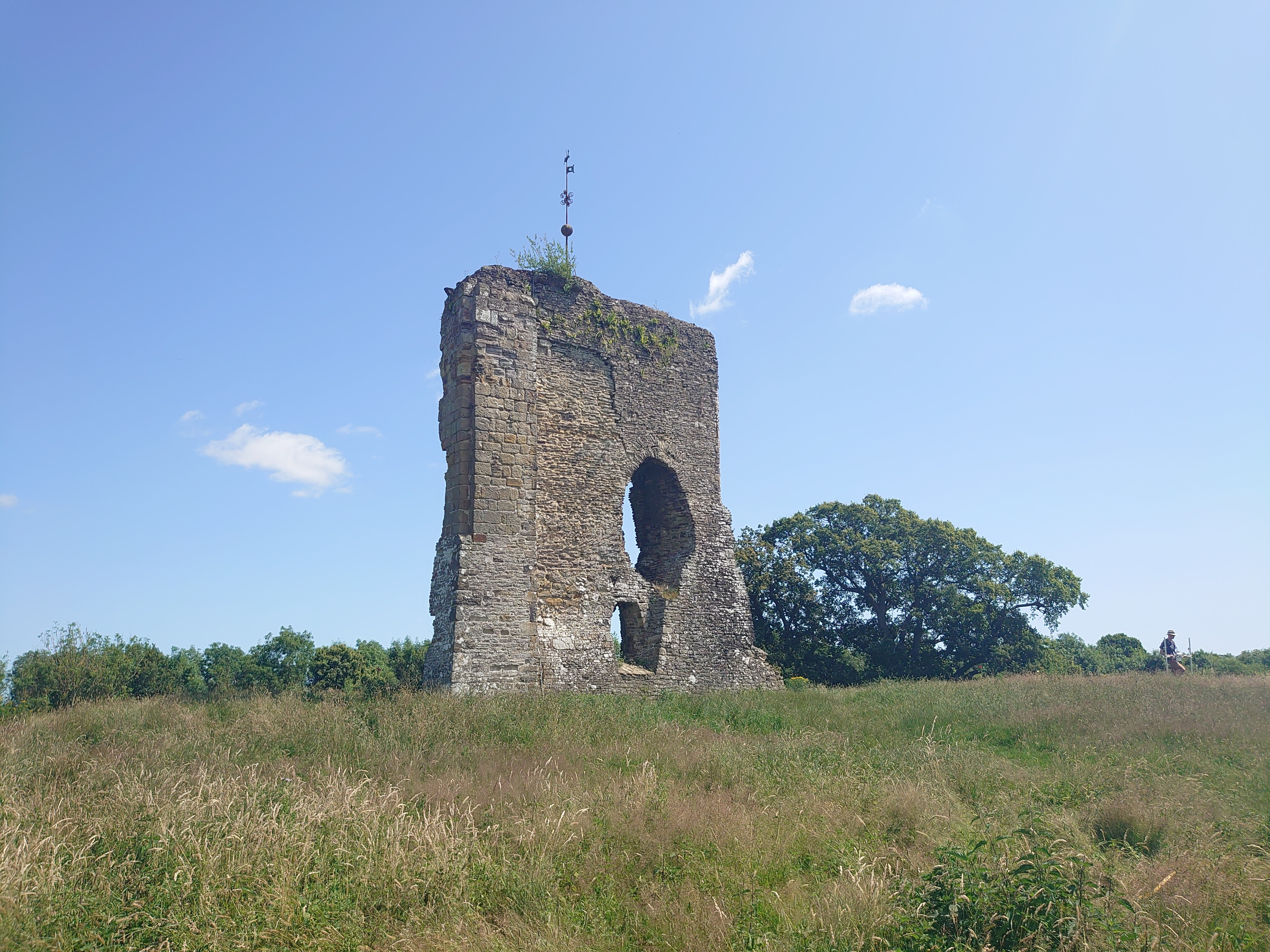
The ruins of the old Knepp Castle in the park after 20 years of the rewilding project, July 2021

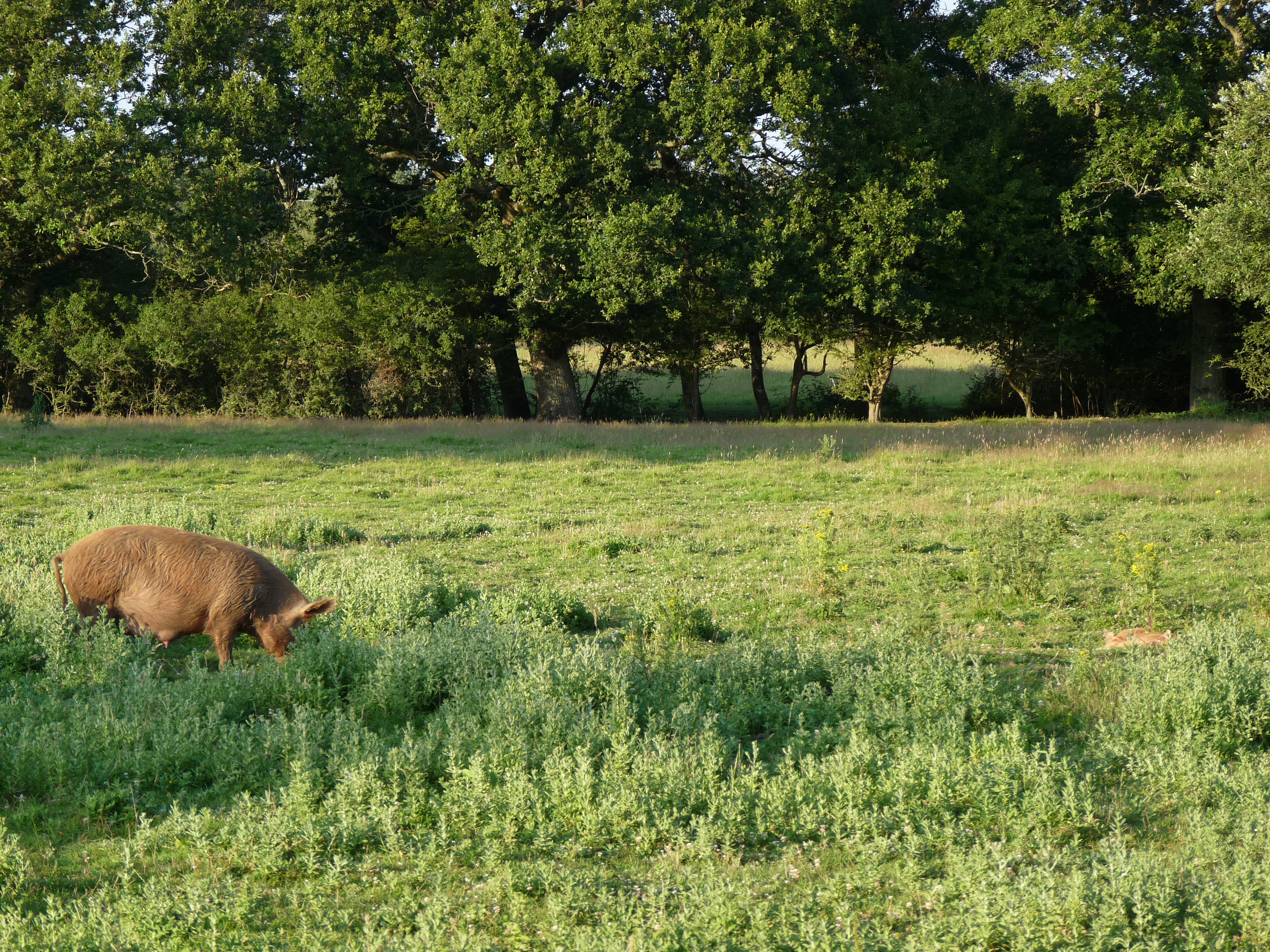
Tamworth sow rootling in a pasture at Knepp Wildland

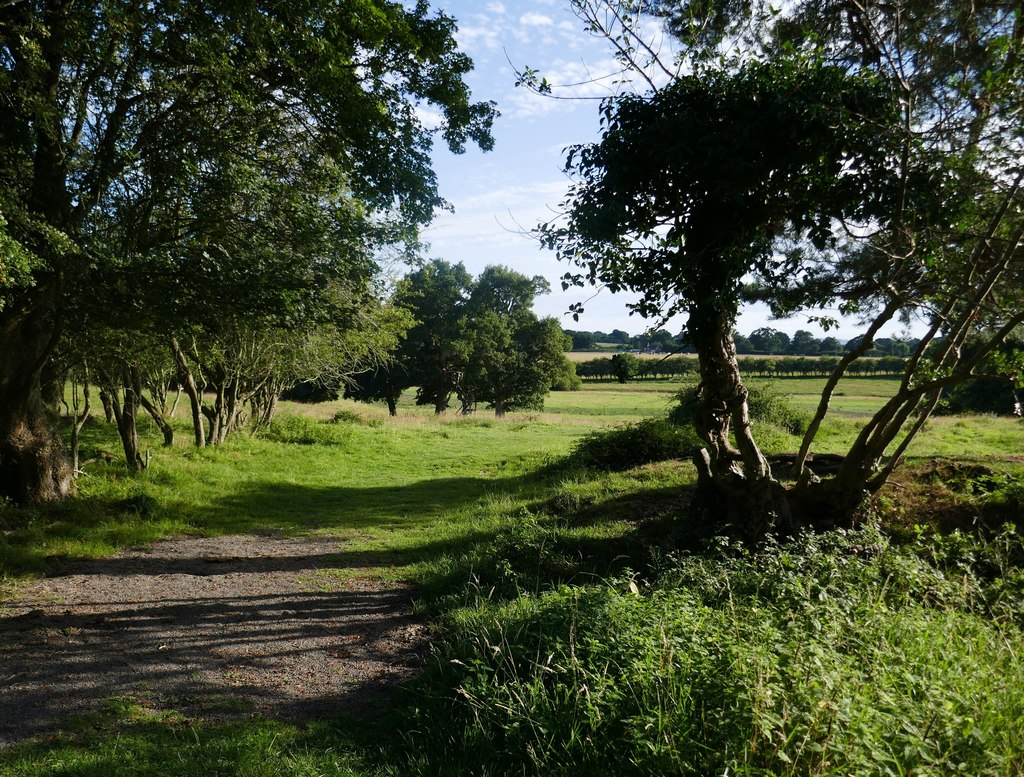
Looking southwest across the Adur floodplain

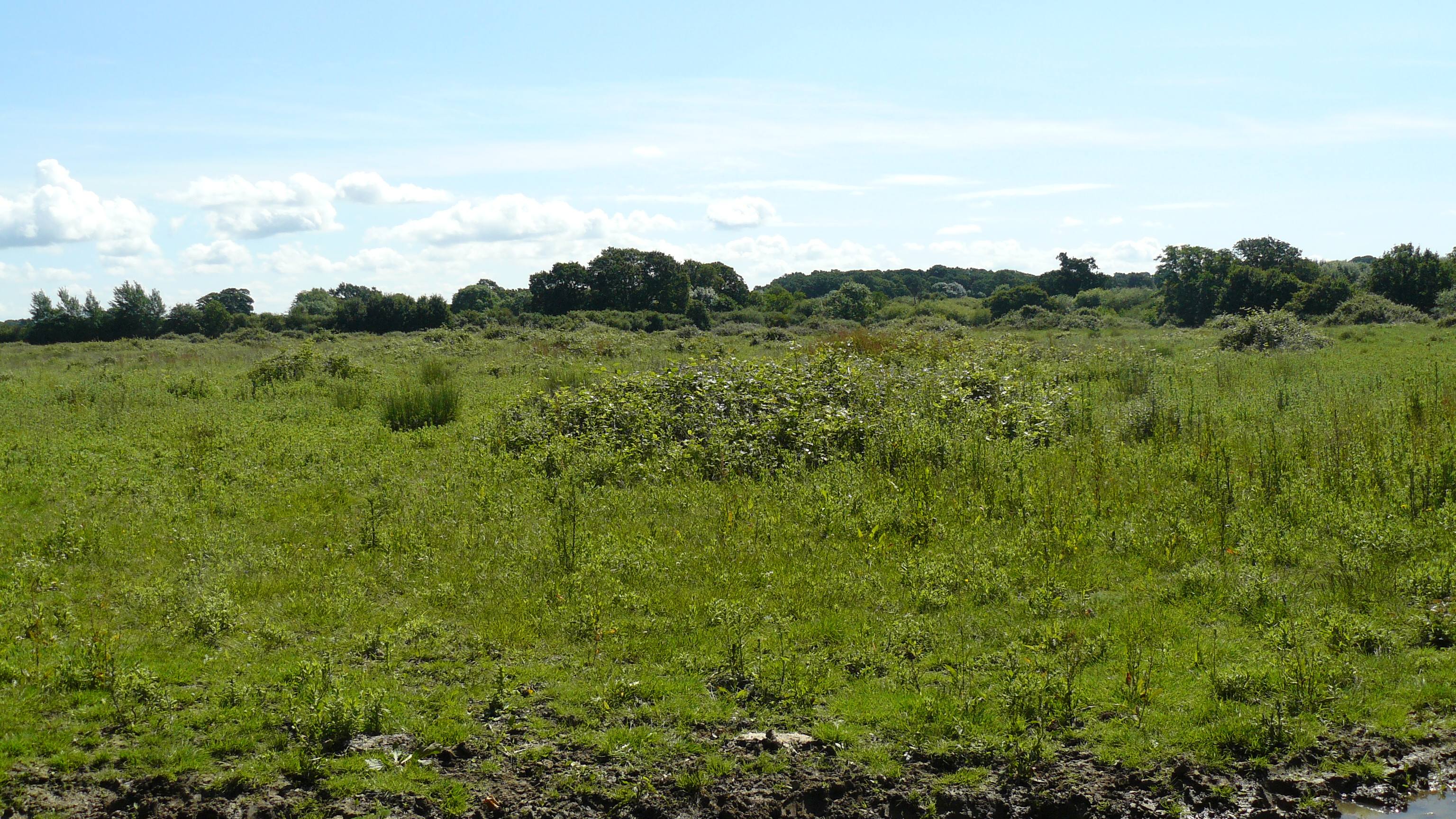
Rootled mud and forest pasture

=== Publication ===
Wilding was published by Pan Macmillan in hardback in 2018, and by Picador in paperback the same year. The 362-page book is illustrated with a sketch map in the front matter, and 30 colour photographs and one graph in two groups of illustrations in the text. The front cover depicts a turtle dove.

== Awards ==
In 2018, Wilding won the Richard Jefferies Society Literature Award, and was listed as one of the top ten science books by Smithsonian magazine. In 2019 it was shortlisted for the Wainwright Prize. The book won the 2023 Zoological Society of London Silver Medal.

== Reception ==
The science writer Caspar Henderson, reviewing the book for The Guardian, recommended it to "anyone prone to despair", calling the increase in bird life "particularly astonishing." He described the project as "perhaps unique in England", and its results spectacular. As for the book, he respects Tree's ability to "write with grace" about all the obstacles and bureaucratic delays that impeded the project, and the combination of local detail – with Sussex words like "clodgy" for a muddy path – and lyricism such as a "blizzard" of painted ladies. He comments that the book's theme is bigger than the story of a single project, as Tree addresses issues like the degradation of soil caused by intensive agriculture, and on the other side the ineffectiveness of conservation efforts which seek a goal rather than allowing nature to recover in its own way. Henderson notes the challenges as Britain goes its own way without the European Union, which had brought in safeguards for nature such as a ban on pesticides that harm bees. He concludes that all the same, he will be "cheering for the rewilders."

The architect Annalie Riches, in the RIBA Journal, wrote that Wilding is a "call to arms" on "rethinking our relationship with the natural world". She described the decision to stop farming as brave, and the book as optimistic. She recommended architects to read the book, noting that they always plant trees or shrubs to improve the sites of new buildings, but had never thought of this as "very urgent". David Sexton, writing in the Evening Standard, called the book an "engrossing account" of what Tree and Burrell "have attempted on their estate". Tilly Lloyd of Radio New Zealand picked Wilding as one of the station's three top books of 2019. She described the decision to seek support from environmental agencies when the farm was "going bankrupt" as "radical", and called the book "a really compelling story".

Alison Parfitt, reviewing the book for the ECOS journal of the British Association of Nature Conservationists, writes that it is "full of surprises". One is that scrub is a rich habitat; another that people react negatively to scrub, and that the chapter "Creating a Mess" on those reactions was "instructive if not entertaining", complete with a poem on the shame of a "plague" of ragwort. Parfitt concludes that the book, with its photographs of a Paleolithic Lascaux cave painting and a matching photograph of an Exmoor pony at Knepp forming part of the suite of different grazers, served as "an affirmation of spirit, wilding spirit".

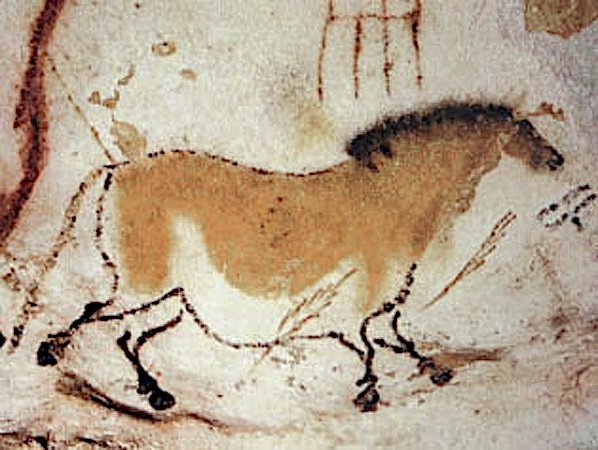
Cave painting at Lascaux

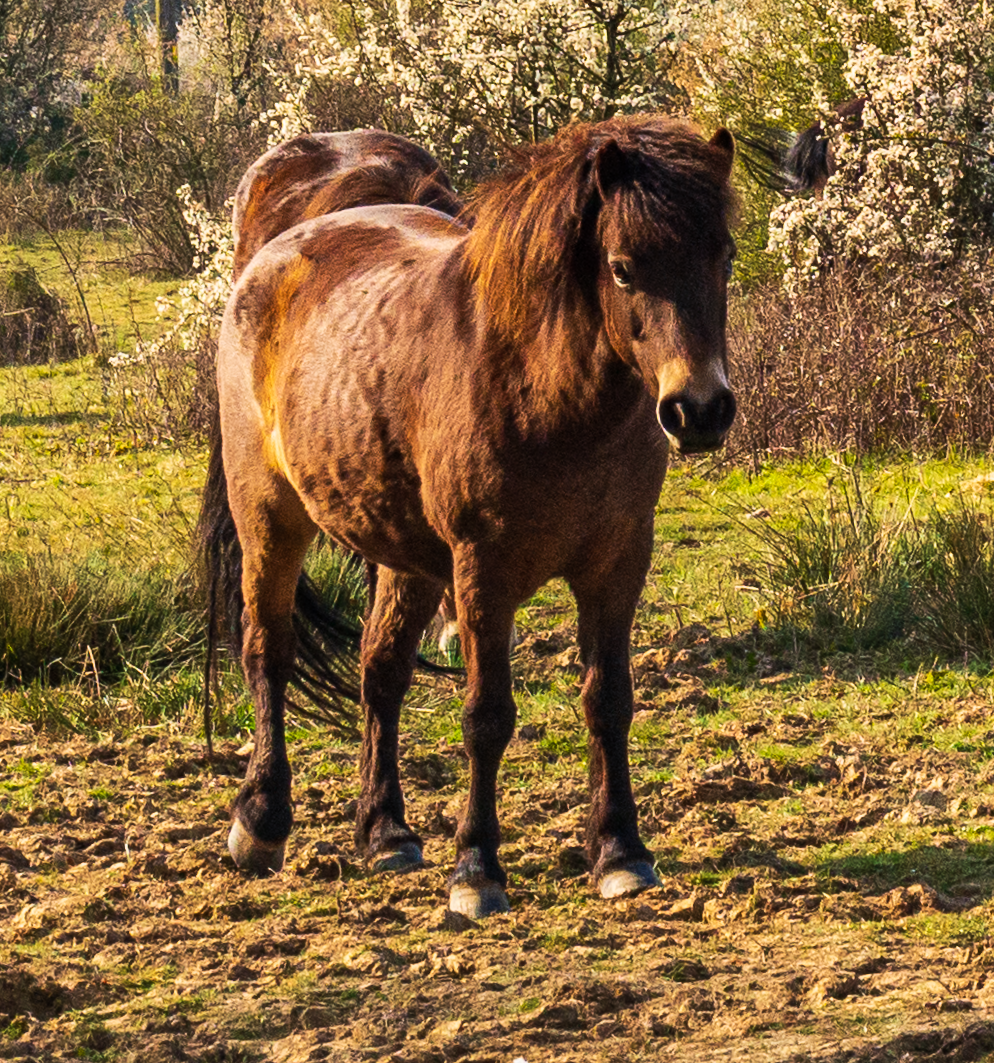
Exmoor pony at Knepp

== Sources ==
- Tree, Isabella (2018a). Wilding: the return of nature to a British farm. Pan Macmillan. ISBN 978-1509805105.
- Tree, Isabella (2018b). Wilding: the return of nature to a British farm. Picador. ISBN 978-1509805105.
