= Wilding (film) =

2023 British documentary film

- Directed by: David Allen
- Written by: Isabella Tree
- Produced by: Gaby Bastyra
- Cinematography: Simon de Glanville; Tim Cragg
- Edited by: Mark Fletcher
- Music by: Biggi Hilmars; Jon Hopkins
- Production companies: Passion Pictures; HHMI Tangled Bank Studios
- Release date: 2023 (BFI London Film Festival)
- Running time: 75 minutes
- Country: United Kingdom
- Language: English

Wilding is a 2023 British documentary film directed by David Allen, about Charlie Burrell, Isabella Tree and their rewilding project Knepp Wildland in West Sussex. The film is based on Tree's 2018 book of the same name.

== Cast ==
Exmoor ponies at Knepp Wildland

- Charlie Burrell
- Isabella Tree
- Rhiannon Neads
- Matthew Collyer

== Synopsis ==
The documentary follows Tree and Burrell – both in the present and through filmed recreations of their younger selves using actors – as they transition Knepp away from intensive farming and instead encourage natural processes and biodiversity. The couple decides to stop farming partially as a result of a visit from an expert on oak trees, Ted Green, who draws to their attention how intensive farming is harming their existing oaks. The rewilding includes allowing large herbivores like Exmoor ponies, Tamworth pigs, deer and English longhorn cattle to roam freely, based on the ideas of conservationist Frans Vera. While the project faces criticism from those who see it as a waste of agricultural land, an affront to aesthetics, or a risk of spreading weeds, the rewilding project sees successes such as the appearance of turtledoves, and the successful reintroduction of the white stork.

== Production ==
According to Tree, she and Burrell had received numerous approaches to make a film adaption of Tree's book. They asked advice from David Allen, who they already knew, about who to go ahead with, and Allen suggested he adapt it himself.

Filming took place at the estate for years, and there was also filming inside Tree and Burrell's home for some weeks. Film crews documented the first release of beavers, and the first flight of a wild-raised white stork – both the first time in England for hundreds of years. The stork's flight was captured by drone.

== Reception ==
The film has an 83% rating on Rotten Tomatoes. A review for The Guardian gives the film 3/5 stars and describes it as 'half puff job, half genuinely inspirational record of a rare eco-success story.' A Time Out review labels the documentary 'soul-enhancing' and 'hopeful', and praises the cinematography. An article for ABC News describes how the film 'isn't wagging the finger, it's celebrating the power of change.'

However, a review for The Times was more negative, labelling the documentary 'bland and dull' with a lack of drama or humour, despite the value of the Knepp rewilding project.

== Release ==
Wilding had its world premiere in 2023 at the BFI London Film Festival.
