= Dial Post =

Village in West Sussex, England

Coordinates: 50.96377°N 0.35651°W

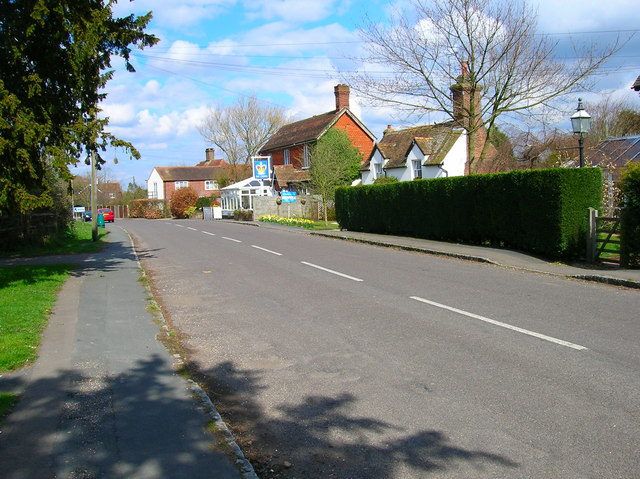
- Worthing Road, Dial Post

- Location within West Sussex
- OS grid reference: TQ155195
- Civil parish: West Grinstead
- District: Horsham
- Shire county: West Sussex
- Region: South East
- Country: England
- Sovereign state: United Kingdom
- Post town: Horsham
- Postcode district: RH13 8
- Dialling code: 01403
- Police: Sussex
- Fire: West Sussex
- Ambulance: South East Coast
- UK Parliament: Horsham

Dial Post is a village in the Horsham District of West Sussex, England. It lies in the civil parish of West Grinstead, whose largest settlement, Partridge Green, is 2 miles (3.2 km) to the east. The village has a population of around 100, based on the average headcount per inhabited dwelling; in 2001 the population of the civil parish as a whole was 2,934. The village lies on the edge of the Knepp Wildland, a pioneering rewilding project.

== History ==
The origin of the name is uncertain, although a common explanation is that it combines two local features – a sundial that once stood in the garden of Dial Post House (dial) and the practice of posting horses at the coaching inn, The Crown (post). Dial Post House, a large building dated 1712, post-dates the name of the settlement, as do Dial Post Farm and Dial Post Fields, which were named in the early 18th century. Dial Post Farm comprised 300 acres (120 ha) in about 1710, when it was leased for 21 years. A public house called the Crown at Dial Post is first recorded in 1874.

The ruins of medieval Knepp Castle lie between Dial Post and Southwater beside the A24.

== Amenities and landmarks ==
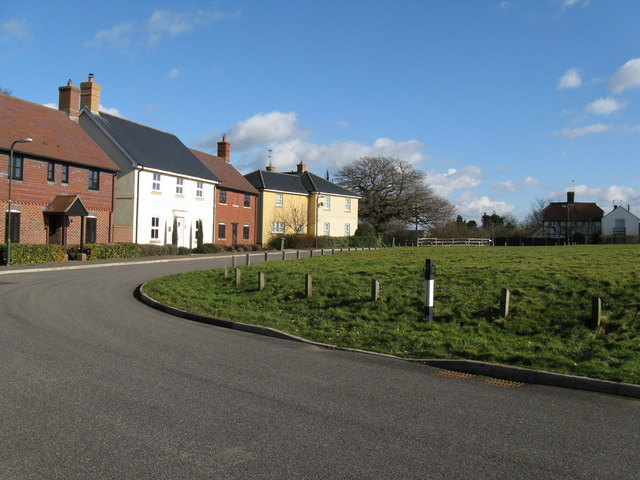
The Green

There is one public house, the Crown Inn, a garden centre, and a development at Blakers Yard offering commercial space and dwellings, but no church in Dial Post. The village centre retains four of the area's listed buildings, all of Grade II:

- New Lodge
- Hazel Cottage
- Alma Cottage
- Dial Post House

Dial Post adjoins the Knepp Wildland, a 3,500-acre (1,400 ha) area of former arable and dairy farmland on the Knepp Castle estate that has been devoted to rewilding since 2001, with free-roaming cattle, ponies, pigs and deer acting as proxies for the herbivores that once grazed the landscape. In 2020 the estate saw the first white stork chicks known to have hatched in the wild in Britain since 1416. The estate's visitor facilities in the village include the Wilding Kitchen café and restaurant and a farm shop, opened in 2023 in a converted 18th-century Sussex barn; the restaurant was subsequently awarded a Michelin Green Star for sustainable gastronomy.

A new village hall, built with the help of a £50,000 grant from the Sussex Downs and Low Weald LEADER programme, was completed early in 2010.

The ecclesiastical parish centres on an ancient Grade I listed church, St George, in the middle of West Grinstead. The parishioners have undertaken to maintain the chancel in exchange for the grant from the glebe estate in 1511 of the church house (see chancel repair liability). Similarly, across that village centre is the listed Catholic Church of Our Lady of Consolation and St Francis.

== Transport ==
Dial Post originally lay on the A24 road linking London, Epsom, Leatherhead, Horsham and Worthing, between Southwater and Ashington; a straighter bypass now carries the road to the east of the village.
