= Frans Vera =

Dutch biologist and conservationist

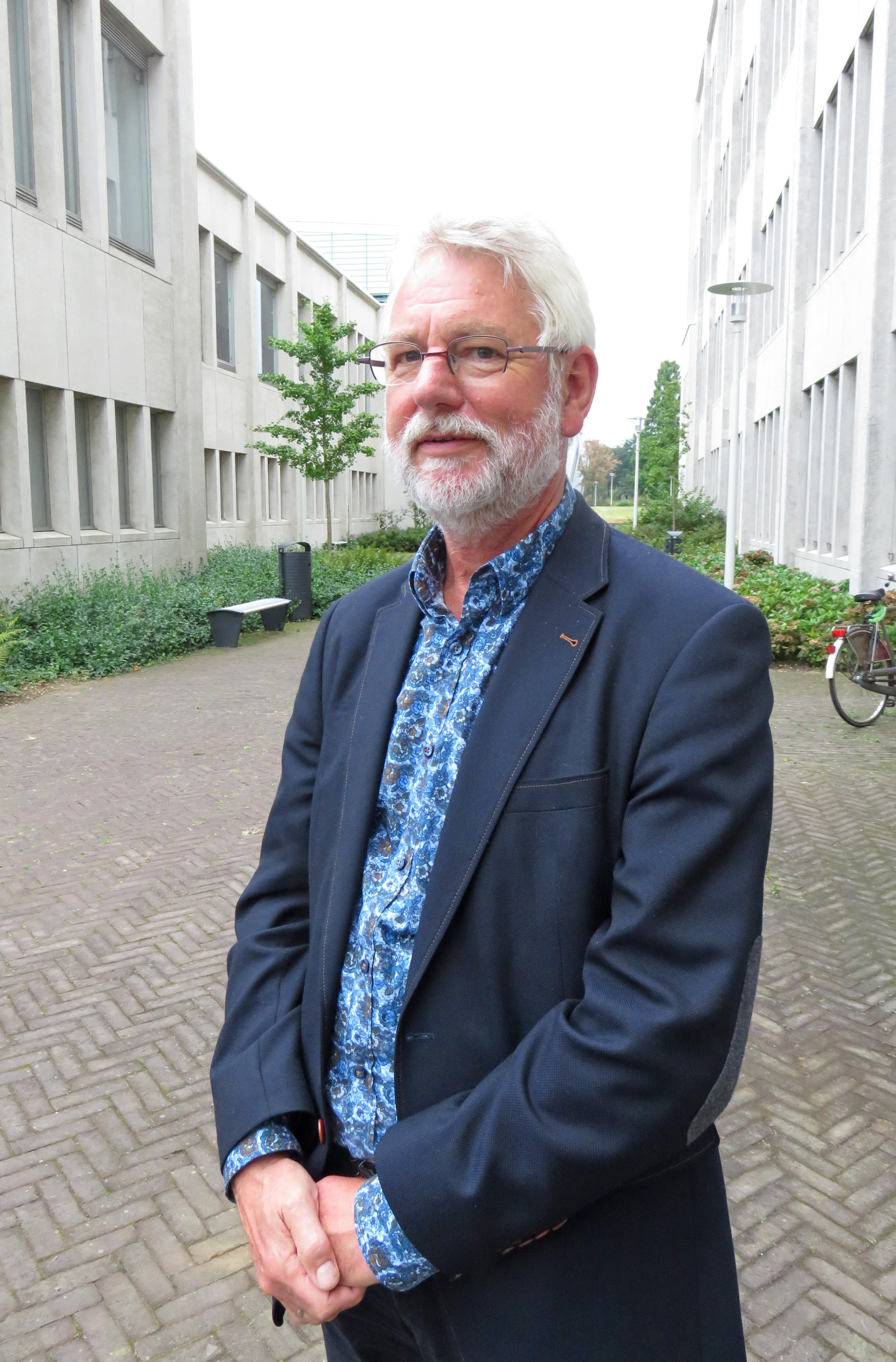
- Dr Frans Vera, September 2016
- Born: 4 June 1949 (age 76); Amsterdam

Dr Frans Vera (born Franciscus Wilhelmus Maria Vera; Amsterdam, 4 June 1949) is a Dutch biologist and conservationist. He has played a key part in devising the current ecological strategy for the Netherlands. He has hypothesised that Western European primeval forests at the end of the Pleistocene epoch did not consist only of "closed-canopy" high-forest conditions, but also included pastures combined with forests, a hypothesis variously addressed as the Vera hypothesis or the wood-pasture hypothesis.

== Biography ==
At a young age, Vera was fascinated by books by the Dutch writer, publisher and photographer A.B. Wigman (1891–1972) such as De Hoge Veluwe (1954), and by the Dutch naturalist, cineaste, photographer, journalist and writer Jan P. Strijbos (1891–1983). His teacher at primary school also stimulated his interest in nature. At high school he worked with Paul Opdam (born 1949) to search in the Utrechtse Heuvelrug moraine for the few remaining nests of the goshawk. He came into contact with Maarten Bijleveld, who initiated Operatie Havik ("Operation Goshawk") at that time, and with H.J. Slijper, the falconer and painter.

From 1970 to 1978 Vera studied biology at the VU University Amsterdam (VU) in Amsterdam. Here he was influenced by Prof. Lambertus Vlijm, animal ecologist. In 1979 he joined the Inspectie Natuurbehoud (Inspectorate for Nature Conservation) of the Staatsbosbeheer, the Dutch state organisation for forestry and management of nature reserves, where he worked on "valuable agricultural cultural landscapes", and later on natural development in large natural areas and areas of water. In 1982 he moved to the Ministerie van Landbouw, Natuurbeheer en Visserij, the then Ministry of Agriculture, Nature Management and Fisheries, where he became head of the department for Natural Development and Large Natural Areas. In 1988 he co-authored an Exploratory Study of Natural Development, which presented the concept of the "ecological main structure" (Ecologische Hoofdstructuur, or EHS), which was subsequently incorporated into the Ministry's 1989 Nature Policy Plan.

In 1989, Vera moved to the Faculty of Nature Management at Landbouwuniversiteit Wageningen (now Wageningen University & Research (WUR) where he received his PhD in 1997, after completing his thesis Metaforen voor de wildernis. Eik, hazelaar, rund en paart ("Wilderness metaphors. Oak, hazel, cattle and horse"), on the appearance of the vegetation in the lowlands of Central and Western Europe after the end of the last ice age, early in the current Holocene epoch. An adapted version of his thesis was published in 2000 as Grazing Ecology and Forest History.

He has also worked as director of the Stichting Natuurlijke Processen (Natural Processes Foundation), University of Groningen, as a guest staff member at the University of Groningen's Centre for Ecological and Evolutionary Studies (CEES), and as Senior Policy Adviser to the Strategic Policies Division at the Minister's Office in The Hague. He retired in June 2014, but still works as scientist and policy adviser.

== Hypothesis ==
Vera has hypothesised that in the primeval landscape of lowland Europe large herbivores maintained an open landscape. He has argued that as a result European primeval forests were not closed-canopy, i.e. with dense growth of trees in which the top branches and leaves form a ceiling, or canopy, so that light can barely penetrate to reach the forest floor, resulting in reduced vegetation growing under and between the mature trees, leaving the ground mostly free of brush.

His book Grazing Ecology and Forest History challenges views on the nature of the former natural landscape. Vera argues that, if the ancient natural forest were to consist only of closed-canopy conditions, then the light demanding tree species would not be as well represented in the fossil record as they are. He proposes a semi-open landscape for the lowlands of Central and Western Europe of c.7,000 years ago, and that large herbivores produced a shifting mosaic of vegetation. Others have suggested that fire and windthrow may also have had important roles.

== Oostvaardersplassen Nature Reserve ==
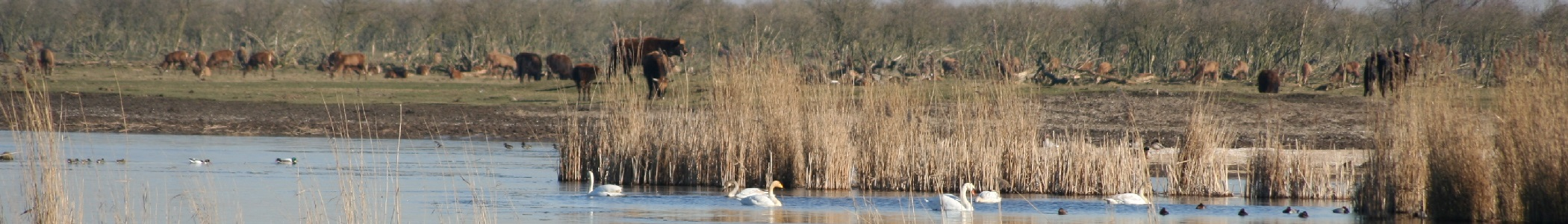
Oostvaardersplassen nature reserve.

Vera has played a significant part in the nature conservation project to develop the Oostvaardersplassen nature reserve in southern Flevoland, which was reclaimed in 1967.

Initially, part of the polder was intended for industrial development, but once the land was reclaimed, the need for land for industry had diminished. An area of thousands of hectares remained uncultivated along the Oostvaardersdijk, and that area quickly developed into a site with great natural wealth and potential. On 6 September 1973, Prof. H.J. van Duin, head of the Scientific Department of the then Rijksdienst voor de IJsselmeerpolders (National Institute for Polders, or R.IJ.P.) suggested in an interview that attention should be paid to the area that was then called “the Knar reserve”. In 1979 Dr. E.P.R. Poorter, biologist at the R.IJ.P., wrote about the Oostvaardersplassen in De Lepelaar ("The Spoonbill"), the journal of the Vogelbescherming Nederland (the Netherlands Society for the Protection of Birds).

Vera had been privately involved in activities to safeguard and develop Oostvaardersplassen, and Poorter's article prompted him to take action. He wrote an article for the magazine Natuur en Milieu ("Nature and Environment") to draw attention to the fact that the area did not have any protected status. When Vera joined the Staatsbosbeheer shortly afterwards, he was able to make an official effort to protect the area. A short time later, after a report from Vera and pressure from the Natuur & Milieu environmental organisation, from Vogelbescherming Nederland, and from the action group Redt de Oostvaardersplassen (Save the Oostvaardersplassen), the nature reserve was designated as a natural monument and the railway line between Almere and Lelystad was rerouted, so that the reserve was not divided.

In 1986, more than 5,700 hectares were brought within the protection of the Nature Conservation Act, an area approximately 10 km long and 6 km wide. Vera proposed the reserve should develop by natural processes, and nature allowed to take its course. Greylag geese had been breeding in the Oostvaardersplassen from 1970 onwards, and moulted in large numbers in the spring (in 1987 more than 30,000 moulting greylag geese were counted), Grazing of these geese in the marshy part, in combination with a dynamic water table, prevented the wetlands from becoming overgrown and therefore conserved many protected bird species.

Vera then proposed the next step, the introduction of large herbivorous mammals to the reserve as proxy species in order to recreate a grassland ecology and keep the higher, drier, parts of the new nature reserve clear. Large grazers such as Heck cattle, wild horses, Koniks horses, and red deer have been used to maintain the natural dynamics in the Oostvaardersplassen. The animals are kept behind a fence and cannot migrate.

The management of the reserve based on "natural processes" has led to high mortality rates of large herbivores, many of which die naturally from starvation, resulting in criticism from media and politicians and occasional public protests. The experiment is considered scientifically controversial due to the lack of predators and other native megafauna such as wolves, bears, lynx, elk, boar, and wisent.

== Influence ==
Vera and others started a new approach to Dutch nature conservation in the 1980s, and the current ecological strategy for the Netherlands is partly derived from his work at Oostvaardersplassen, striving for a varied but especially more "natural" environment, in which certain natural processes are given more space. Together with five colleagues Vera authored the Plan Ooievaar ("Stork Plan"), which proposed restoring natural processes such as flooding the floodplains of big rivers. This plan has been one of the foundations of the Nature Development policy of the Ministry of Agriculture, Nature and Food Quality (LNV), especially in relation to the development of nature along the great rivers in the Netherlands.

Although his theory about large grazers in the original European landscape, and the operation of the Oostvaardersplassen Nature Reserve, remains controversial, he has had great influence. His key work is the 1997 thesis Metaforen voor de Wildernis ("Metaphors for the Wilderness"), of which an adapted English version was published in 2000 entitled Grazing Ecology and Forest History.

The greatest impact of Vera's hypothesis is that some ecologists now believe the key principle of "rewilding" should be to change conservation away from preservation and towards the restoration of natural processes, by letting the landscape with its plants and animals run wild. Traditionally, it was expected that this approach would result in dense forest, and a mass extinction of wild flowers and butterflies requiring sunlight. The experiment at Oostvaardersplassen has shown that “natural” grazing can create a more dynamic landscape of open glades and wooded groves.

Vera’s views have been used as the partial basis for several projects, such as those at Oostvaardersplassen, at Knepp Wildland in England, and for the Rewilding Britain organisation.

== Awards ==
On 29 September 1990 Vera received the Gouden Lepelaar ("Golden Spoonbill") award from Vogelbescherming Nederland for his important contribution to the protection of birds, as an expert in the field of nature development, and his close involvement in the conservation and development of the Oostvaardersplassen.

== Publications ==
Publications by Vera include:

- Vera, F. W. M. (1979). "Het Oostvaardersplassengebied; uniek oecologisch experiment (The Oostvaardersplassen area: a unique ecological experiment)". Natuur en Milieu (Nature and Environment) (in Dutch). 3: 3–12.
- Vera, F. W. M. (1980). De Oostvaardersplassen : de mogelijkheden tot behoud en verdere ontwikkeling van de levensgemeenschap (The Oostvaardersplassen. The possibilities for preservation and further development of the ecological community) (in Dutch). Vol. 1980–1. Staatsbosbeheer. p. 63. OCLC 905679450.
- Vera, F. W. M.; Hendriks, J. L. J. (1981). De ontwikkeling van het Markiezaatsmeer als natuurgebied: een beheersvisie (The development of the Markiezaatsmeer as a nature reserve: a management vision) (in Dutch). Vol. 1981. Staatsbosbeheer. OCLC 64271299.
- Vera, F. W. M.; Hancock, J.; Wolff, W. J.; Braakhekke, W. G. (1985). Waterland : waterrijke natuurgebieden in de wereld (Waterland: wetlands in the world) (in Dutch). Weert: M&P. OCLC 64199752.
- de Bruin, Dick; Hamhuis, Dick; van Nieuwenhuijze, Lodewijk; Overmars, Willem; Sijmons, Dirk; Vera, Frans (1987). Plan Ooievaar: De toekomst van het rivierengebied (Stork Plan: The future of the river area) (in Dutch). Arnhem: Stichting Gelderse milieufederatie.
- Vera, F. W. M. (1988). De Oostvaardersplassen. Van spontane natuuruit-barsting tot gerichte natuurontwikkeling (The Oostvaardersplassen: from spontaneous natural eruption to targeted nature development) (in Dutch). Haarlem: IVN/Grasduinen-Oberon. ISBN 90-320-70010. According to Voous (1995, p. 514) “a masterpiece of thorough observation and courageous management vision”.
- Baerselman, Fred; Vera, Frans (1995). Nature Development. An exploratory study for the construction of ecological networks. The Hague: Ministry of Agriculture, Nature management and Fisheries. OCLC 1016789829 (all editions).
- Vera, F.W.M. (1997). Metaforen voor de wildernis: eik, hazelaar, rund en paard (Metaphors for the wilderness: oak, hazel, cattle and horse) (in Dutch). Wageningen: Wageningen University and Research (dissertation). OCLC 1016608759 (all editions). (adapted English version: Vera 2000)
- Vera, F.W.M. (2000). Grazing ecology and forest history. Wallingford etc.: CABI publishing. ISBN 978-0851994420. OCLC 468711118 (all editions). (adapted English version of Vera 1997)
- Vera, Frans W. M. (2002). "The Dynamic European Forest." (PDF). Arboricultural Journal. 26 (3). AB Academic Publishers: 179–211. Bibcode:2002ArbJ...26..179V. doi:10.1080/03071375.2002.9747335. S2CID 129801882. Archived from the original (PDF) on 2023-10-20.
- Vera, Frans W. M.; Bakker, Elisabeth S.; Wolff, Hans (2006). "Large herbivores: missing partners of western European light-demanding tree and shrub species?". In Danell, Kjell; Duncan, Patrick; Bergström, Roger; Pastor, John (eds.). Large Herbivore Ecology, Ecosystem Dynamics and Conservation (PDF). Cambridge: Cambridge University Press. pp. 203–231. ISBN 9780511617461.
- Vera, Frans; Buissink, Frans; Weidema, Jaap (2007). Wilderness in Europe. What really goes on between the trees and the beasts. Baarn: Tirion Natuur. ISBN 9789052106885.
- Vera, Frans W. M. (2009). "Large-scale nature development - the Oostvaardersplassen." (PDF). British Wildlife. 29: 29–36. Archived from the original (PDF) on 2023-10-23.
- Vera, Frans (2010). "The Shifting Baseline Syndrome in Restoration Ecology". In Hall, Marcus (ed.). Restoration and History - The Search for a Usable Environmental Past (PDF). Routledge Studies in Modern History. pp. 98–110.
- Vera, F. W. M. (2013). "Can't See the Trees for the Forest". In Rotherham, Ian D. (ed.). Trees, Forested Landscapes and Grazing Animals - A European Perspective on Woodlands and Grazed Treescapes. Routledge. pp. 99–126.

== Sources ==
- Voous, Karel Hendrik (1995). In de ban van vogels. Geschiedenis van de beoefening van de ornithologie in Nederland in de twintigste eeuw (Under the Spell of Birds. History of the Practice of Ornithology in the Netherlands in the Twentieth Century). (in Dutch). Utrecht: Scheffers. pp. 514–515. ISBN 90 5546 013 3
- "Eurosite workshop 2014: Living with wilderness in Europe: communicating non intervention management strategies and dealing with public perceptions of growing populations of large herbivores and carnivores" (PDF). Eurosite workshop. Eurosite. p. 5. Archived from the original (PDF) on 2021-10-28.
- Schulting, Renske; de Baaij, Gerard (1998). "Een interview met Frans Vera: Het wandelende bos (An interview with Frans Vera: The walking forest)". Nederlands Bosbouw Tijdschrift (Netherlands Forestry Magazine) (in Dutch). 70 (3). OCLC 1156550572.
- Tree, Isabella (2018). Wilding: the return of nature to a British farm.. London: Picador. ISBN 978-1-5098-0509-9. OCLC 1035680140.
