= Isabella Tree =

British author and travel journalist

- Born: 1964 (age 61–62)
- Education: University of London
- Occupations: Conservationist, writer
- Spouse: Charles Burrell (m. 1993)
- Children: 2
- Parents: Michael Lambert Tree (father); Lady Anne Tree (mother)
- Relatives: Edward Cavendish (grandfather); Mary Gascoyne-Cecil (grandmother); Ronald Tree (grandfather); Nancy Lancaster (grandmother)
- Website: isabellatree.com

Isabella Tree, Lady Burrell (born 1964) is a British author and conservationist. She is author of the book Wilding: The Return of Nature to a British Farm that describes the creation of Knepp Wildland, the first large-scale rewilding project in lowland England. The 3,500-acre (1,400-hectare) wildland project was created in the grounds of Knepp Castle, the ancestral home of her husband, Sir Charles Burrell, a landowner and conservationist.

== Biography ==
Tree attended Millfield School. She was adopted by an aristocratic British family as a baby. She read Classics, following the advice of author Iris Murdoch and went to the University of London.

From 1993 to 1995, Tree was a travel correspondent at the Evening Standard. In 1999 she was Overall Winner of the Travelex Travel Writers' Awards for a feature on Nepal's Kumaris, or "Living Goddesses" – "High and Mighty" – for the Sunday Times. She has written articles for The Guardian and National Geographic Magazine.

Tree is married to Sir Charles Burrell and lives at Knepp Castle in West Sussex.

== Books ==
- Tree, Isabella (1996). Islands in the Clouds: Travels in the Highlands of New Guinea. Lonely Planet Publications. ISBN 9780864423696.
- ––––– (2001). Sliced Iguana. Bloomsbury USA. ISBN 1845114965.
- ––––– (2004). The Bird Man: The Extraordinary Story of John Gould. Barrie & Jenkins. ISBN 071262158X.
- ––––– (2014). The Living Goddess. Eland Publishing. ISBN 978-0143422549.
- ––––– (2018). Wilding: The Return of Nature to a British Farm. Pan Macmillan. ISBN 9781509805105.
- ––––– (2020). Second Nature. Granta. ISBN 9781909889361.
- ––––– (2021). When We Went Wild. Ivy Kids. ISBN 9780711262850.
- ––––– (2022). When The Storks Came Home. Ivy Kids Eco. ISBN 9780711272798.
- ––––– (2023). The Book of Wilding: A Practical Guide to Rewilding Big and Small. Bloomsbury. ISBN 9781526659293.
- ––––– (2024). Wilding: How to Bring Wildlife Back, The Illustrated Guide for Children.

== Awards ==
- 1996: Shortlisted for the Thomas Cook Travel Book Award (Islands in the Clouds)
- 1999: Overall winner of the Travelex Travel Writer Awards
- 2018: Richard Jefferies Society Literature Award (Wilding)
- 2018: One of the top ten science books – Smithsonian Magazine (Wilding)
- 2019: Shortlisted for Wainwright Prize (Wilding)
- 2020: Awarded the CIEEM (Chartered Institute of Ecology and Environmental Management) Medal
- 2021: Royal Geographical Society's Ness Award
- 2023: Zoological Society of London Silver Medal (Wilding)
- 2024: Honorary Doctor of Science, University of Sussex

== See also ==
- Wilding (2023 film)
