= Ted Green (academic) =

British academic and arboriculturist

Ted Green MBE is a British academic, scientist, campaigner and arboriculturist. He has been working in a career bridging forestry and conservation for over 50 years, founding the Ancient Tree Forum in 1993. He is described as "Britain's foremost ancient tree expert". He won the Royal Forestry Society's (RFS) Gold Medal for Distinguished Services to Forestry in 2017.

== Life and work ==
Green was born in a village near Silwood and Sunninghill on the edge of Windsor Great Park. As a young boy during the Second World War his father was away serving in the armed forces, and he was then held as a prisoner of war by Japanese forces. As Green's father was being transported, the ship was torpedoed by a US submarine. Following eviction from their home, the boy and his mother moved to an abandoned hut in the military camp at Silwood. He poached animals from the crown estates to help the family. Green credits nature with saving him from a wild childhood. An only child, young Green met foresters too old to serve in the war and from them learnt about forest culture, at a time when timber was being felled for the war effort. The experiences of sharing wisdom and warmth has stayed with Green for the rest of his life.

"Man's passion for ancient trees is boundless, touching all walks of life, professions and classes, and is a continuous thread throughout history. We should recognise that the UK's greatest obligation to the conservation of European biodiversity, heritage and culture rests in our ancient veteran trees."

— Ted Green

Green became a laboratory technician in plant pathology at Silwood Park, a part of Imperial College. Eventually he was given an honorary lectureship by the university, only the second ever awarded. After 34 years of research at the institution, he pursued his passion for ancient woodlands at the Windsor crown estates nearby, where he was able to pursue forestry trials. He also worked as a liaison officer for English Nature and with the National Trust. Green began working at the Knepp estate in Sussex in 1999. He was particularly concerned with the many ancient oaks on the site and over 20 years helped the owners nurture and restore the land, from the start of their wilding project.

As a silvicultural educator Green has appeared on the BBC and in many newspapers and journals, discussing the importance of tree welfare.

"Ted Green, one of the country’s leading authorities on Ancient Trees, woodland fungi, forest soils and associated micro-organisms."

— Royal Forestry Society

Green was awarded the Royal Forestry Society's Gold Medal for Distinguished Services to Forestry by RFS President Sophie Churchill in March 2017. He is lauded for championing the importance of managing whole ecosystems, rather than individual units within them. The RFS state "he has played a major part in influencing land owners to re- appraise the way they manage their woods and to adopt a more holistic style."
