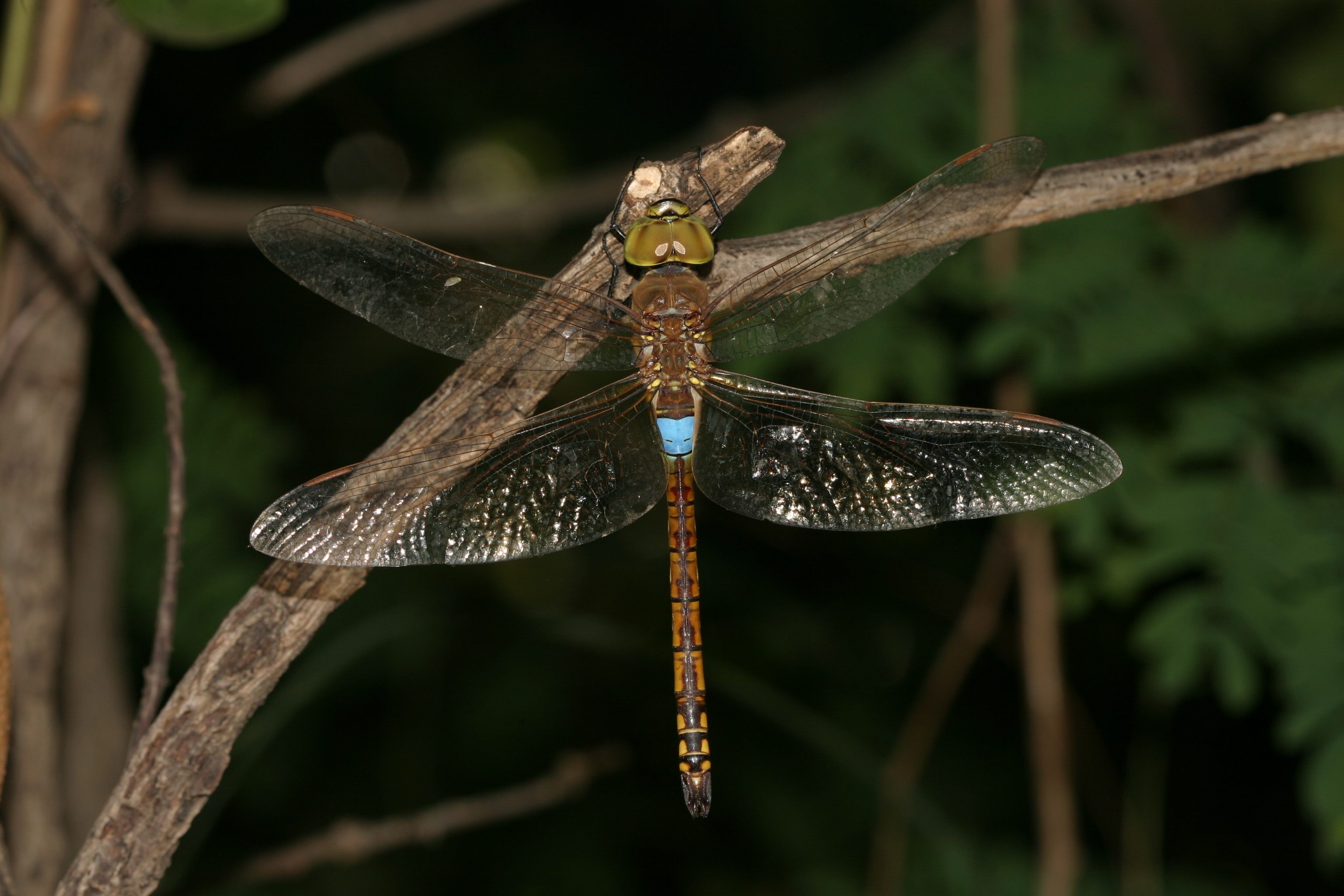
- male
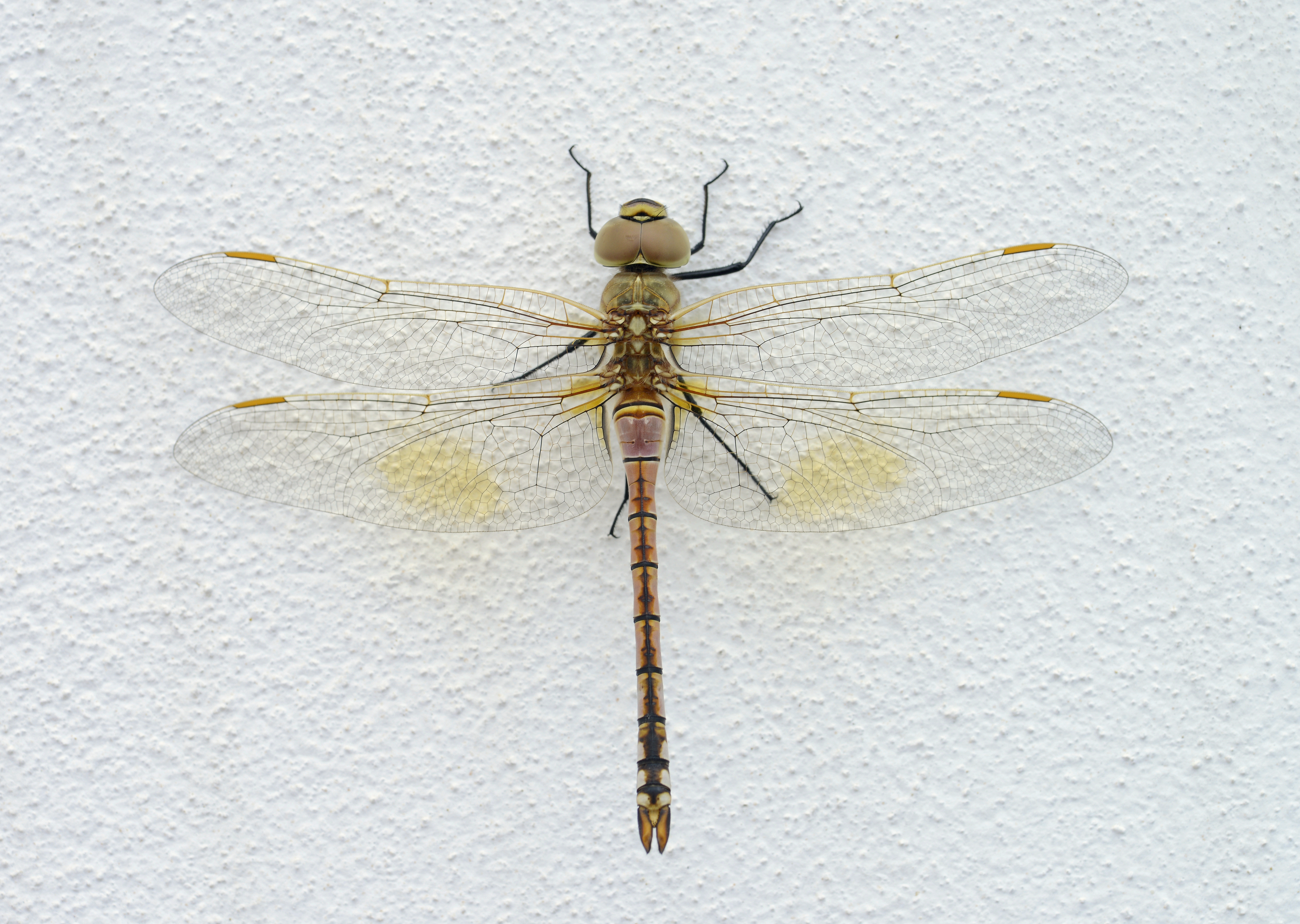
- female

Conservation status
- Least Concern (IUCN 3.1)

Scientific classification
- Kingdom: Animalia
- Phylum: Arthropoda
- Class: Insecta
- Order: Odonata
- Infraorder: Anisoptera
- Family: Aeshnidae
- Genus: Anax
- Species: A. ephippiger

Binomial name
- Anax ephippiger (Burmeister, 1839)

Synonyms
- Crytosoma ephippiger Burmeister, 1839; Anax mediterranea Selys, 1840; Anax senegalensis Rambur, 1842; Anax ephippiger Brauer, 1866; Hemianax ephippiger Selys, 1883

= Anax ephippiger =

Vagrant emperor

Species of dragonfly

Anax ephippiger, the vagrant emperor, is a species of dragonfly in the family Aeshnidae. It migrates to Afro-tropical, Europe, central and southern Asia through monsoon winds.

== Distribution ==
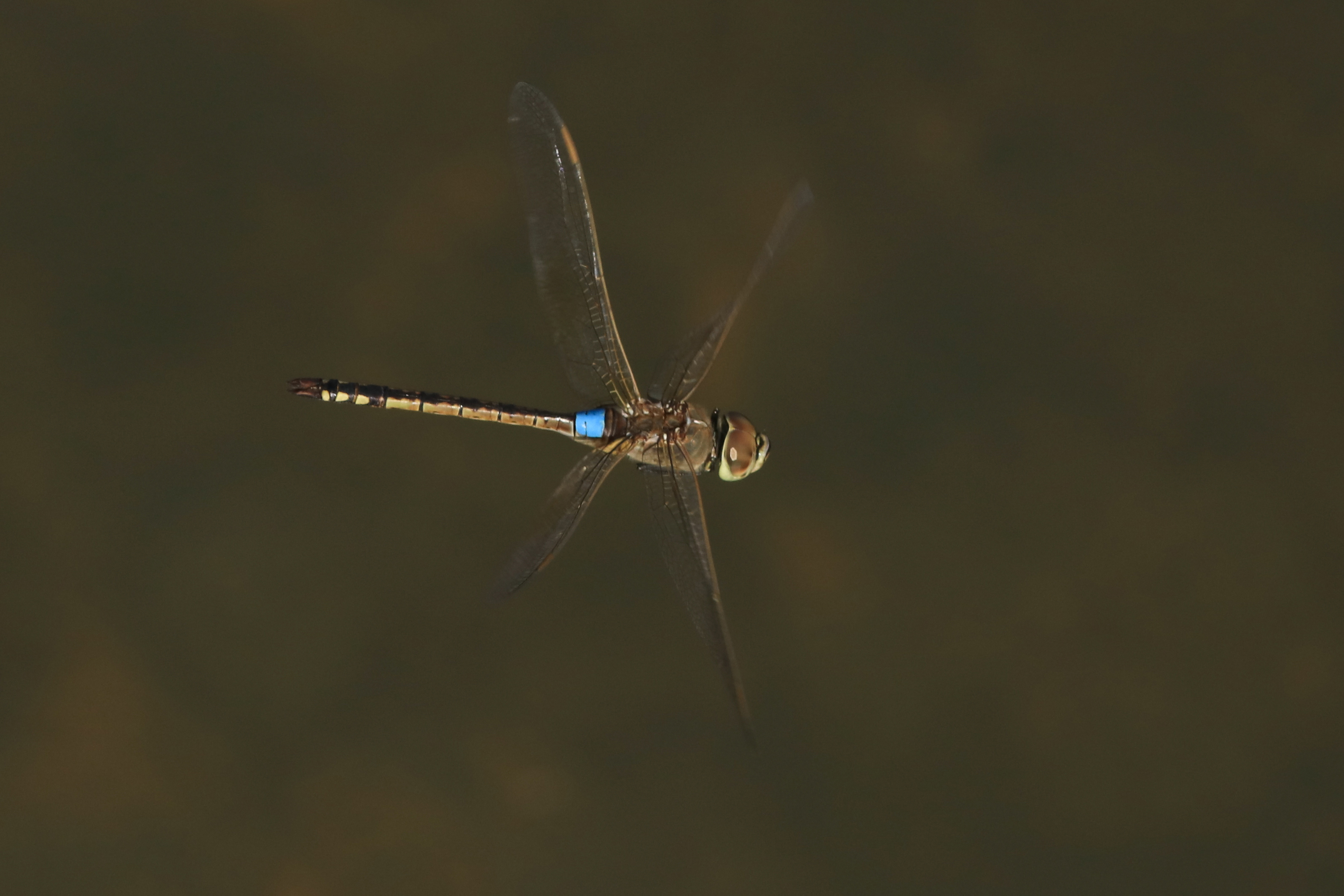
Anax ephippiger male from United Arab Emirates

It is found in Algeria, Angola, Botswana, Cameroon, Chad, the Democratic Republic of the Congo, Ivory Coast, Egypt, Equatorial Guinea, Ethiopia, Gambia, Ghana, Kenya, Kuwait, Madagascar, Malawi, Mauritania, Mauritius, Morocco, Mozambique, Namibia, Niger, Nigeria, São Tomé and Príncipe, Senegal, Seychelles, Somalia, South Africa, Sri Lanka, India, Sudan, Tanzania, Togo, Uganda, United Arab Emirates, Zambia, Zimbabwe, and possibly Burundi. Recorded in Malta in 1957, and every few years since, where it is seen migrating in large numbers. It has never been recorded breeding in the Maltese archipelago. It is increasingly being recorded in coastal Southern England and up to 10 miles (16 km) inland – one was seen at Knepp Wildland on 17 November 2021 (the 5th confirmed record for that year).

== Description and habitat ==
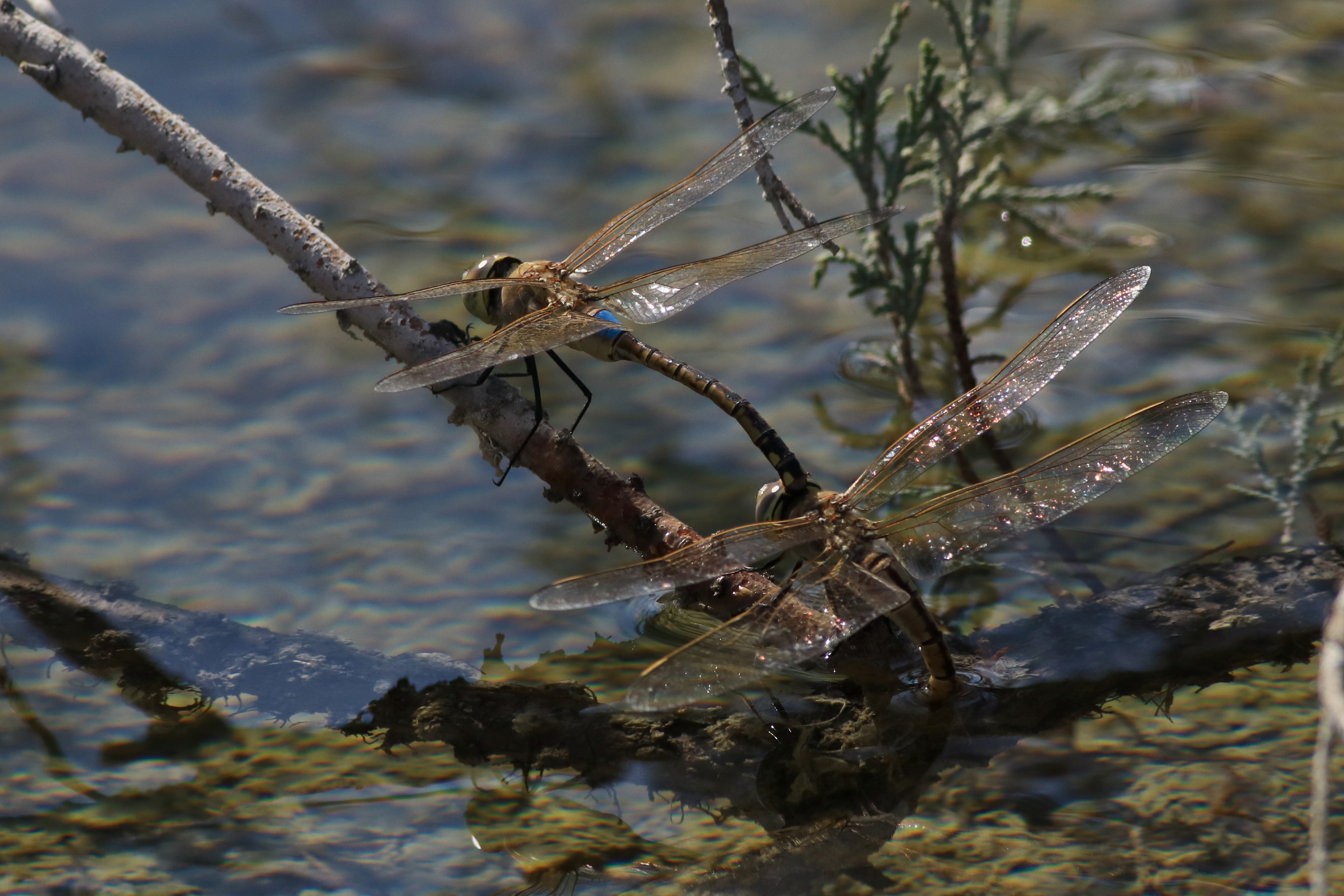
Anax ephippiger pair from United Arab Emirates

It is a large dragonfly with greenish-yellow eyes. Its thorax is olivaceous-brown, paler on sides. Wings are transparent with an amber-yellow patch. Abdomen is ochreous, marked with azure-blue and reddish-brown. Segment 2 is bright blue on dorsum, in males (pale grey-blue in females) and pale green on the sides. Segments 3 to 7 are olivaceous-yellow with irregular reddish-brown stripes on mid-dorsum and narrow black apical annules. There is a broad mid-dorsal blackish-brown stripe on segments 8 and 9, enclosing a pair of triangular yellow apical spots. Segment 10 is bright yellow, with its base and mid-dorsum broadly black. Female is otherwise similar to the male.

Its natural habitats are shrub-dominated wetlands, swamps, freshwater lakes, intermittent freshwater lakes, freshwater marshes, intermittent freshwater marshes, and freshwater springs. It breeds in shallow tanks and marshes.

A rare long-distance migrant to the British Isles, occasionally seen even in winter.
