= Sir Charles Burrell, 10th Baronet =

English landowner and conservationist (born 1962)

Sir Charles Raymond Burrell 10th Baronet
- Born: August 27, 1962 (age 63); Southern Rhodesia
- Education: Millfield School; Royal Agricultural College
- Occupations: Landowner, conservationist
- Known for: Founder of the Knepp Wildland rewilding project
- Spouse: Isabella Tree
- Children: 2

Sir Charles Raymond Burrell, 10th Baronet (born 27 August 1962), is an English landowner, conservationist and founder of the Knepp Wildland, the first large-scale lowland rewilding project in England, which was created in the early 2000s when he stopped conventional farming on 3,500 acres (1,400 ha) of land surrounding the ancestral family home at Knepp Castle in West Sussex.

== Personal life ==
Burrell spent his early years on his parents' farm in the British colony of Southern Rhodesia and then in Australia but returned to England for secondary education. He was educated at Millfield and the Royal Agricultural College. He succeeded to the baronetcy upon the death of his father, Sir John Raymond Burrell, 9th Baronet, on 29 May 2008.

He married the travel writer Isabella Elizabeth Nancy Tree. They have two children.

== Knepp Estate management ==
Burrell lives in West Sussex with his family on the ancestral 3,500-acre (1,400 ha) Knepp Wildland estate in a castellated mansion built for the Burrell family around 1808 by John Nash (built near to the ruins of the medieval Knepp Castle). The estate originally came into the family through Sir Charles Raymond, who made his fortune through the East India Company and bought Knepp in 1787. Burrell inherited the estate at the age of 21 and managed it using conventional intensive farming for 17 years before starting to convert it using rewilding principles in 2000.

== Awards and recognition for the Knepp Wildland project ==
- 2015 People Environment Achievement (PEA) award for Nature
- 2015 Innovative & Novel Project award in the UK River Prize for the River Adur restoration project
- 2017 Anders Wall Award for special contribution to the rural environment in the European Union
- 2017 Gold, Best Guided Tour of the Year, Beautiful South Awards
- In 2023 Isabella Tree and Charlie Burrell received the Zoological Society of London’s Silver Medal for outstanding contributions to the understanding and appreciation of zoology

== Appointments ==
As of January 2023, Burrell is Chair of Foundation Conservation Carpathia, and on the advisory board of The Arcadia Fund, he is on the oversight committee for the Endangered Landscapes and Seascapes Programme. He is chair of The White Stork Project, Knepp Wildland Foundation, and Nattergal Ltd. Vice Chair of rePLANET and Trustee to the Argolic Environment Foundation. He is on the Supervisory Board of Rewilding Europe.

== See also ==
- Wilding (2023 film)

Baronetage of Great Britain
Preceded by John Burrell	Baronet (of Valentine House); 2008–present	Incumbent
