= Tamworth pig =

British breed of pig

Tamworth
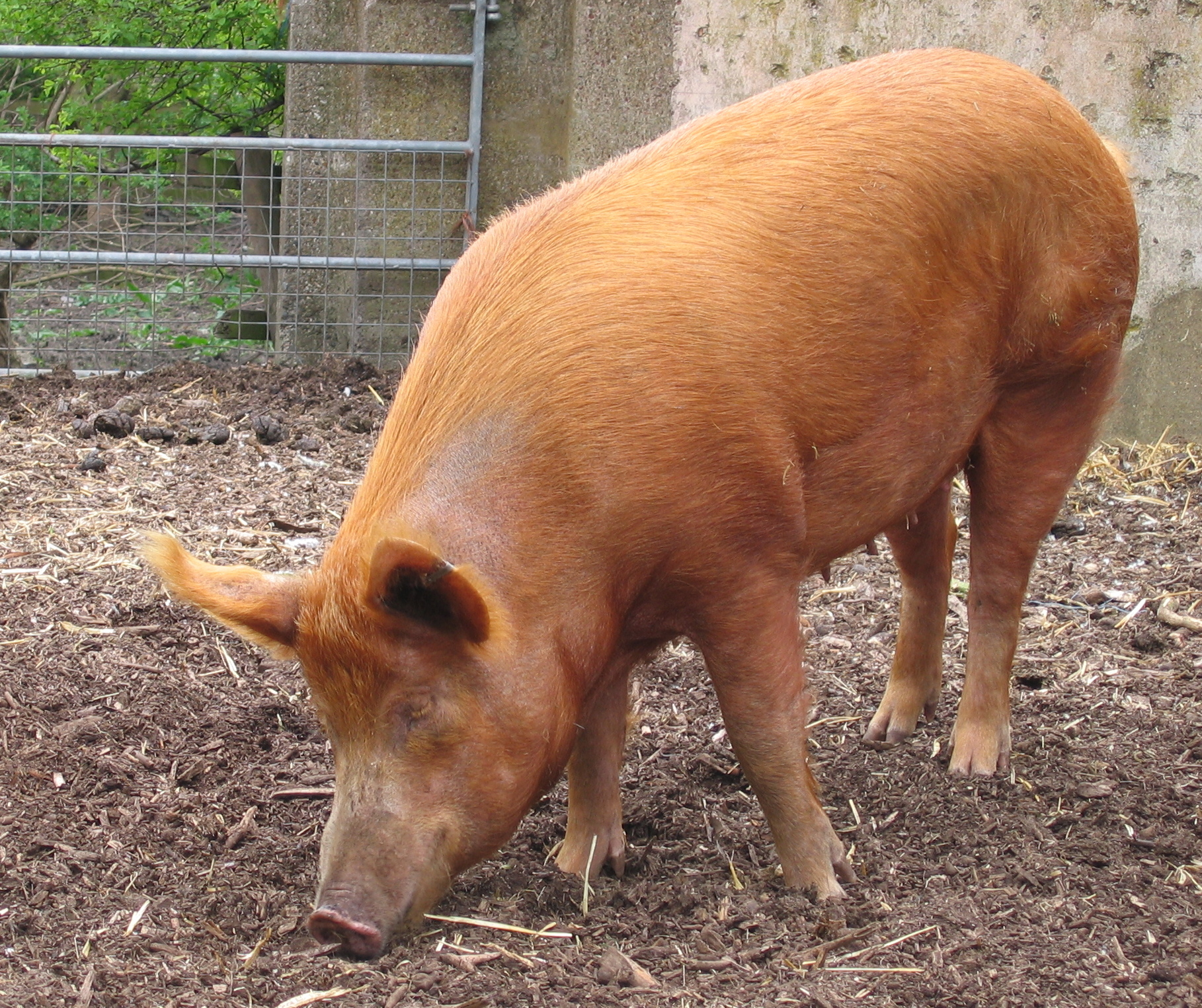

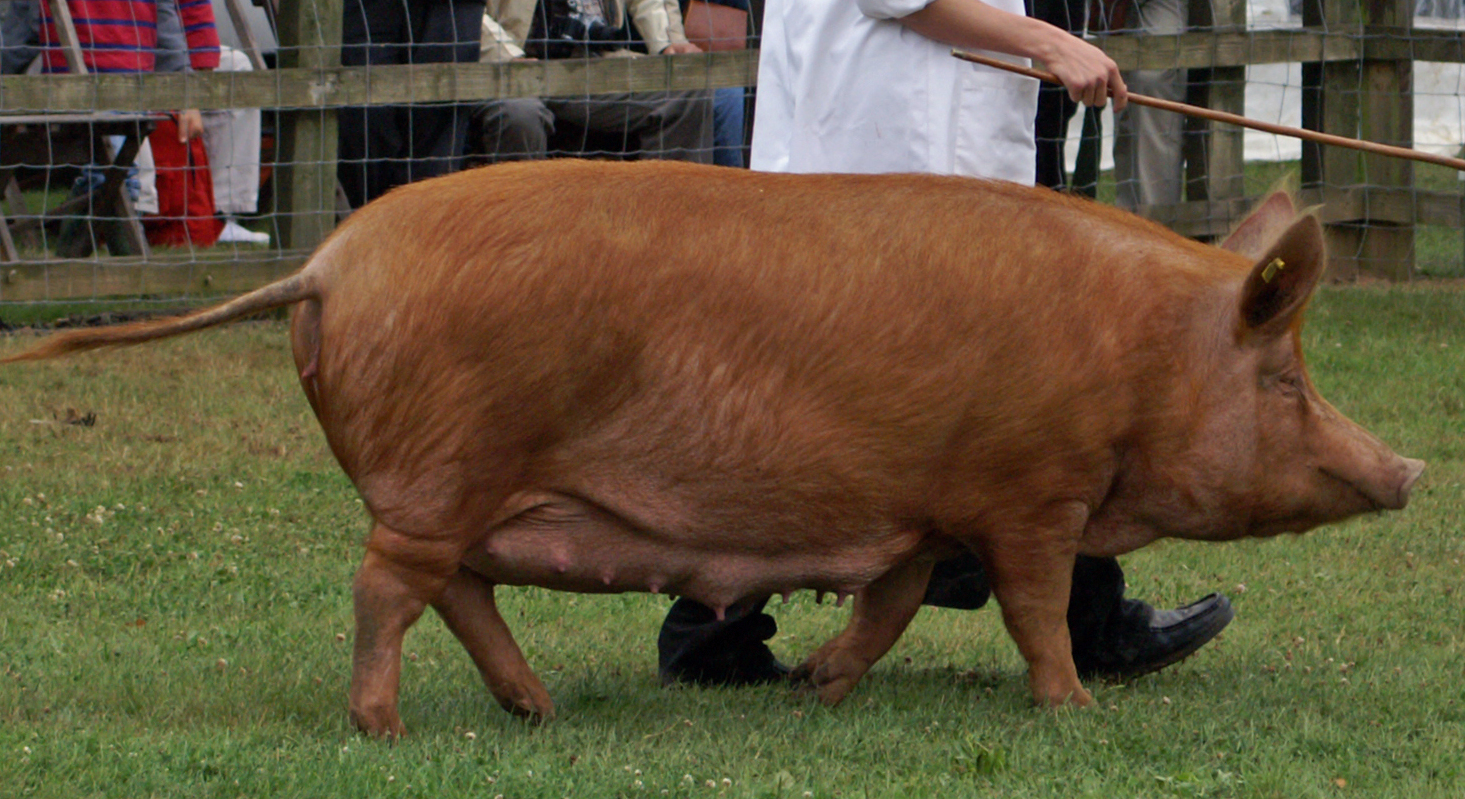
- Conservation status: FAO (2007): not at risk; DAD-IS (2023): at risk/endangered
- Country of origin: United Kingdom
- Standard: British Pig Association; Tamworth Pig Breeders' Club

Traits
- Weight: Male: 320 kg; Female: 260 kg
- Skin colour: flesh-colour
- Hair: red-gold

The Tamworth is a British breed of domestic pig. It is the only red-coloured pig of the United Kingdom. Its origins are unknown, but it appears to have developed near the town of Tamworth in south-eastern Staffordshire, close to the Warwickshire border. It is one of seven British pig breeds listed by the Rare Breeds Survival Trust as 'priority', the highest level of concern of the trust.

== History ==
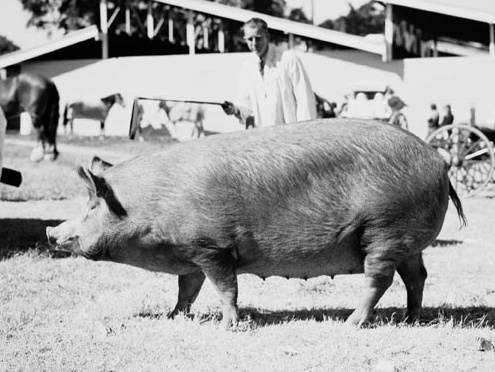
Champion sow in Queensland, Australia, 1950s

The origins of the Tamworth are not known. It appears to have originated shortly before or after 1800 near the town of Tamworth in south-eastern Staffordshire, close to Warwickshire border. There are many theories of the origin of its unusual red colouration: that it derived from a wild jungle pig (Sus scrofa cristatus) brought from India by Sir Francis Lawley; that it derived from Irish pigs known as 'Irish Grazers', brought to Drayton Manor in Drayton Bassett by Sir Robert Peel; that Peel had not used these, but a boar brought from the West Indies; or that the colour was due to a West African Guinea Hog descended from pigs from Portugal, or to a red pig imported in about 1750 from Barbados. The colour may have been fixed by selective breeding alone.

The Tamworth was recognised as a breed in 1865 and entered at the Royal Show in that year. A herd-book was started in 1885, and a breed society, the Tamworth Incorporated Pig Breeders Association, was formed in 1906.

Some Tamworth stock reached Canada in the 1870s, and larger-scale imports began in 1888. Because of its hardiness in the rigid Canadian climate, it became widespread, and by the mid-twentieth century represented about 10% of the pig population; numbers later declined.

In Australia, the breed reached peak numbers of about 1000 in the mid-twentieth century. In New Zealand there were five breeding sows in 2002; in 2021 it was listed as "priority" by the Rare Breeds Conservation Society of New Zealand. Tamworths were imported into the United States by Thomas Bennett of Rossville, Illinois, in 1882, and a breed society was started in 1887 in Ames, Iowa; the Tamworth never became widespread, and in 2012 its conservation status in the USA was listed as "threatened".

== Characteristics ==
It is a medium-sized pig, fine-boned and long and narrow in the body, with a long straight snout, a slightly concave profile, and prick ears. The coat is long, fine and straight and of a red-gold colour, preferably without black hair; the skin is flesh-coloured and should carry no black spots. Average weights are approximately 260 kg for sows and 320 kg for boars.

== Use ==
The Tamworth is reared principally for bacon.

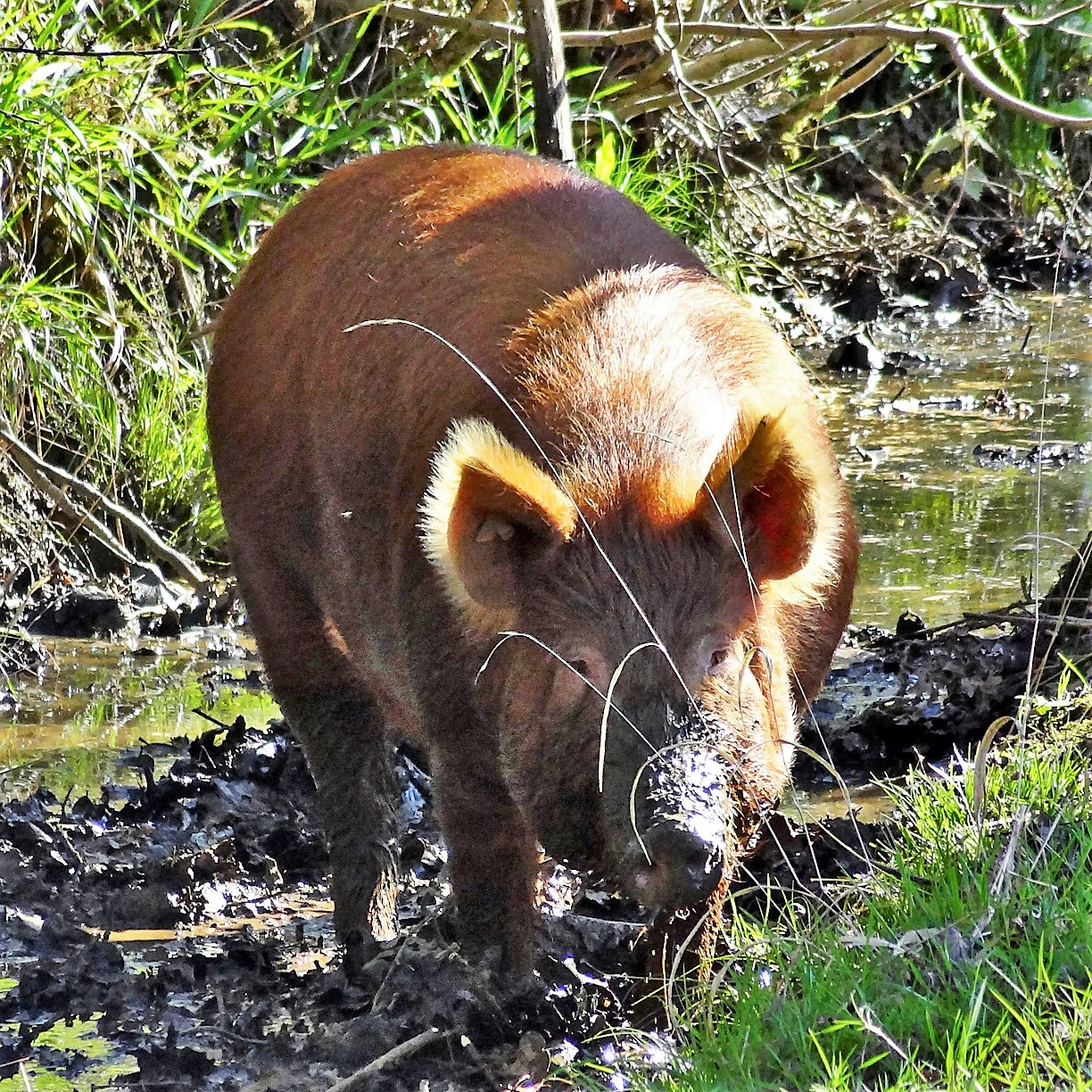
In Knepp Wildland

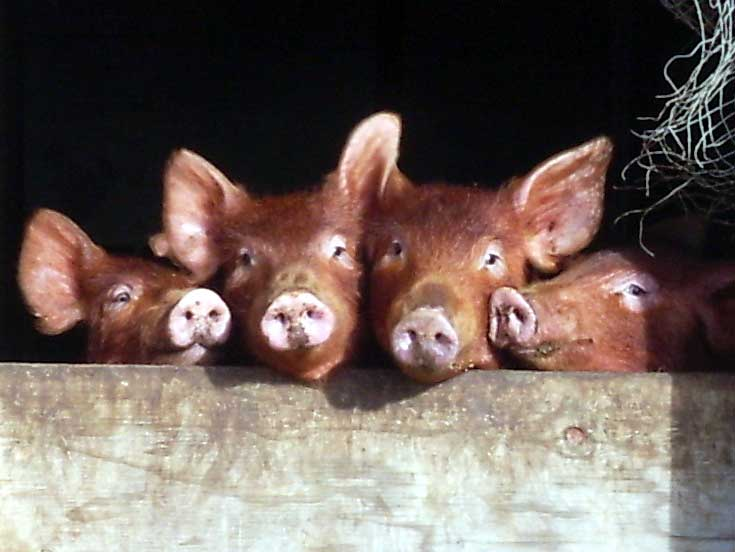
Piglets

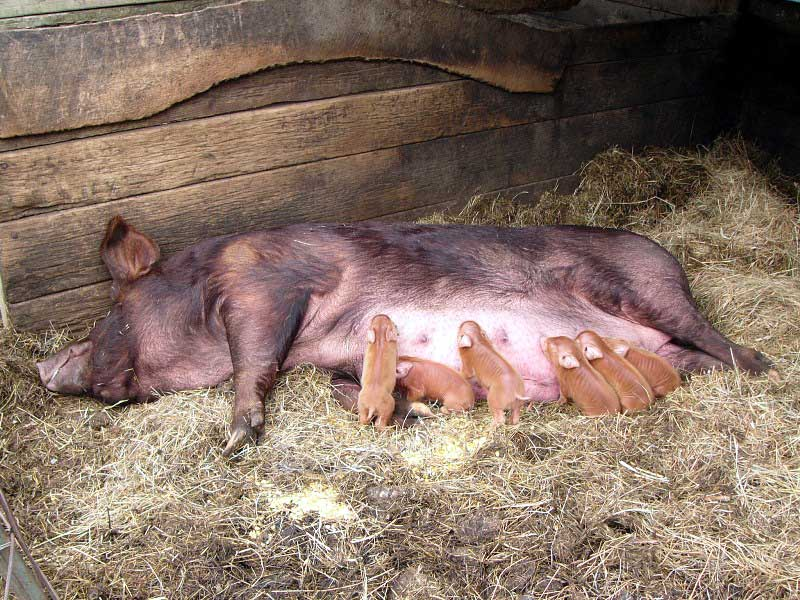
Sow with piglets

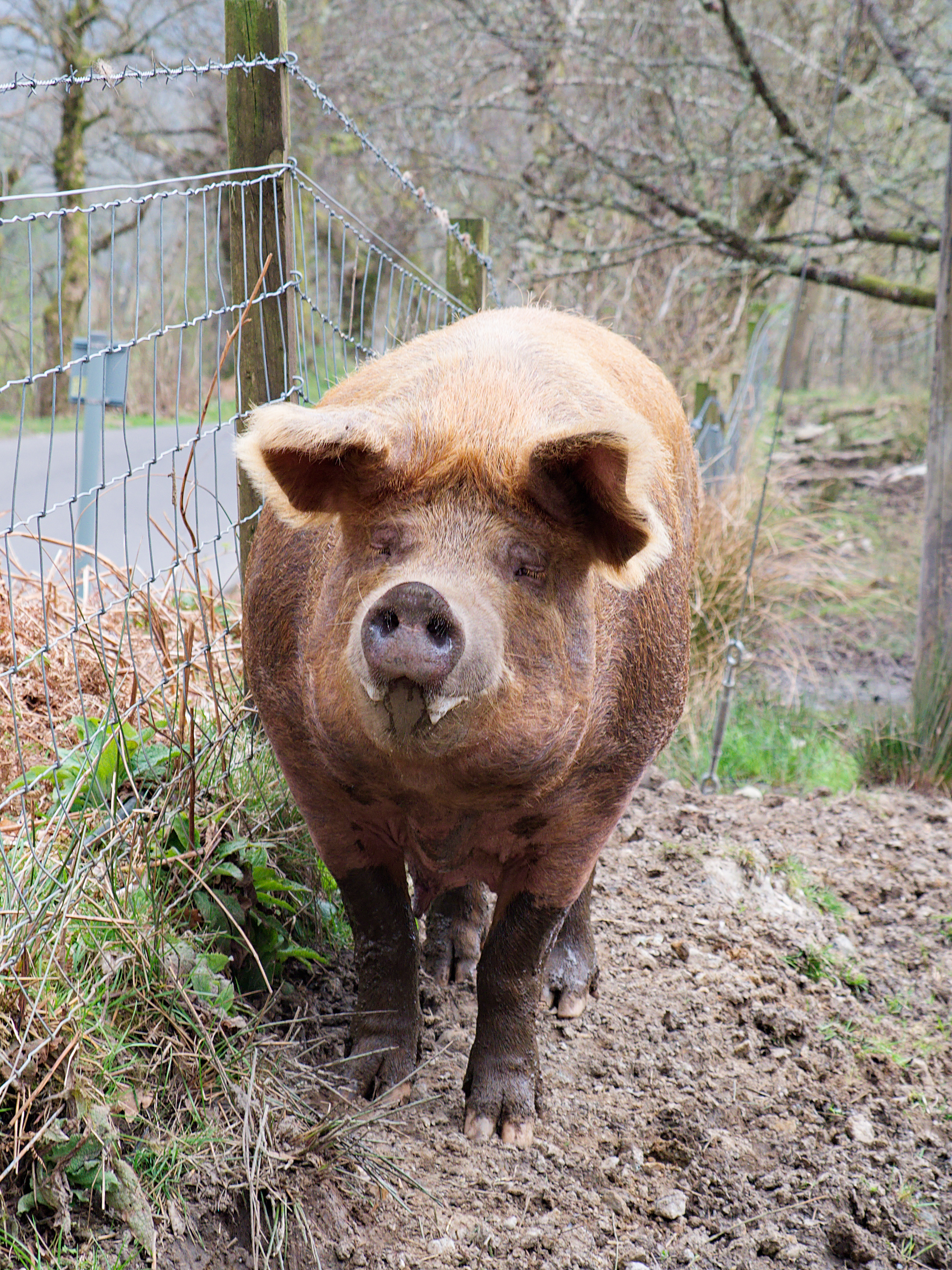
In Stirling, in Scotland
