= Knepp Wildland =

English rewilding project

Coordinates: 50.97578°N 0.34482°W

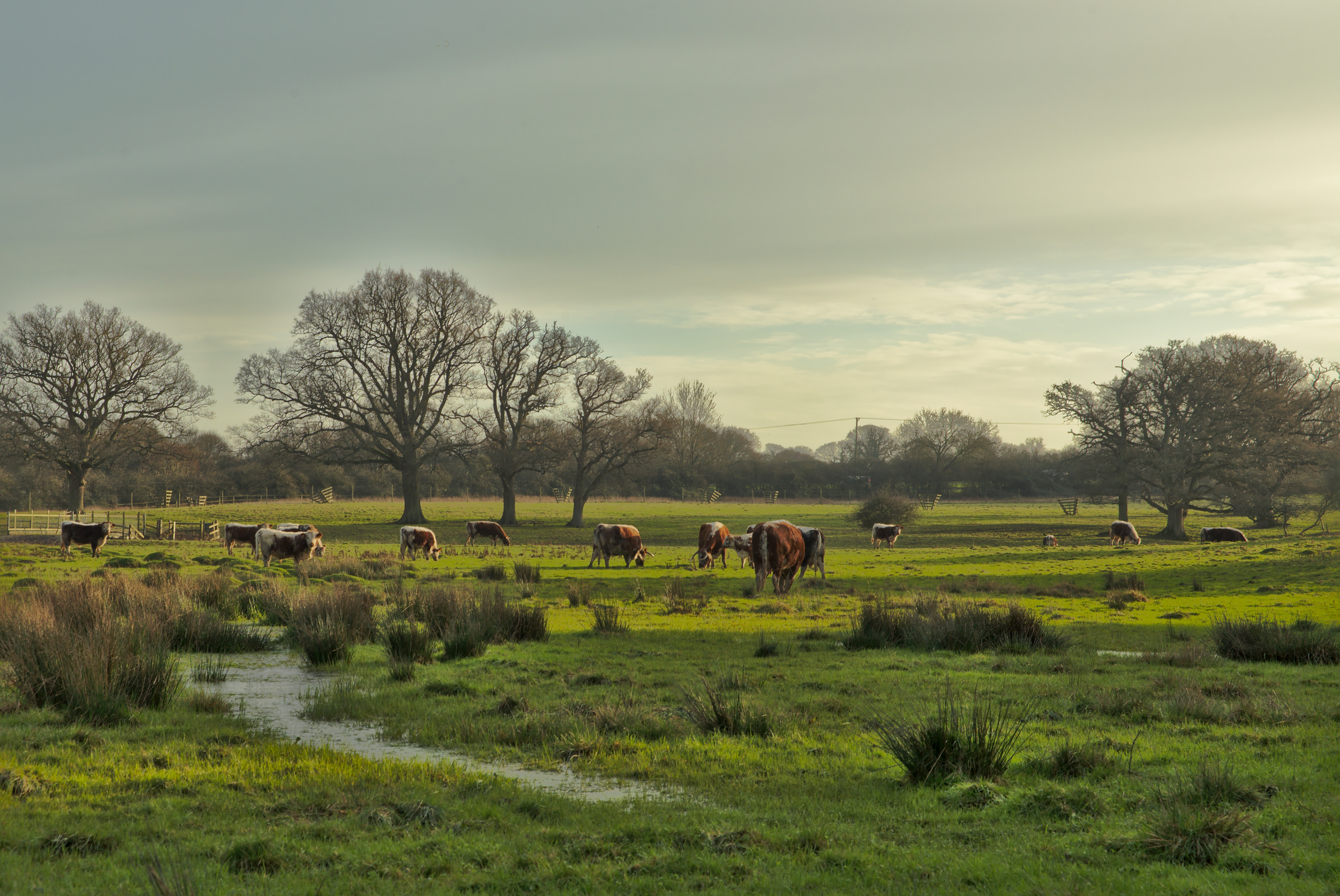
Free-ranging longhorn cattle at Knepp Wildland

Knepp Wildland is the first major lowland rewilding project in England. It comprises 1,400 hectares (3,500 acres) of former arable and dairy farmland in the grounds of Knepp Castle, in West Sussex.

Since 2000 when the conversion from intensive agriculture started, the land now supports many rare species including turtle doves, barbastelle bats, slow-worms and barred grass snakes; it has become a major nesting site for nightingales; a breeding hotspot for purple emperor butterflies; the site of the first white stork chicks raised in the wild in England for 600 years, and is home to the first beavers living in the wild in Sussex for 400 years. On 17 November 2021, the very rare vagrant emperor dragonfly (Anax ephippiger) was discovered in one field.

== History and results ==
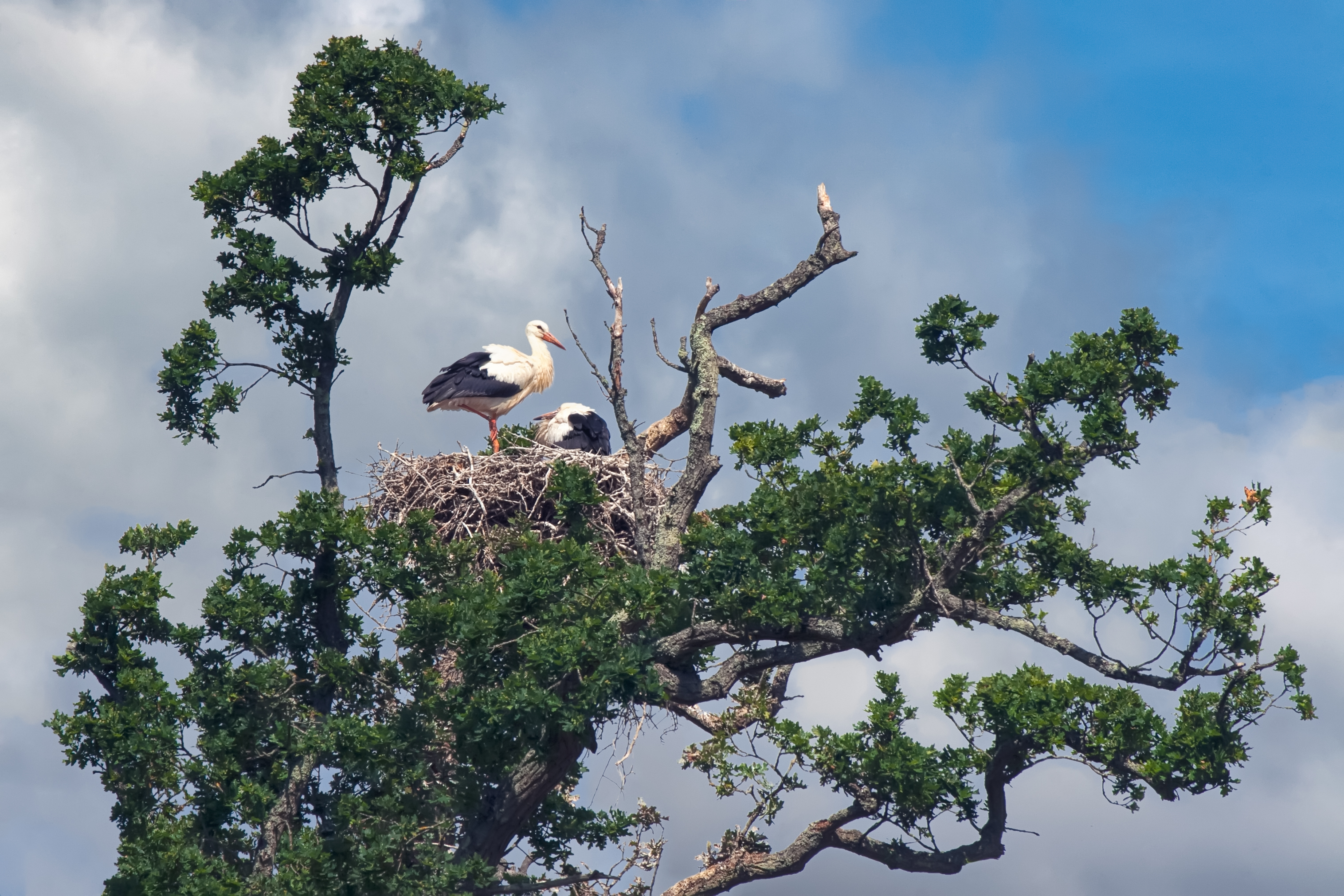
Stork nest at Knepp Wildland

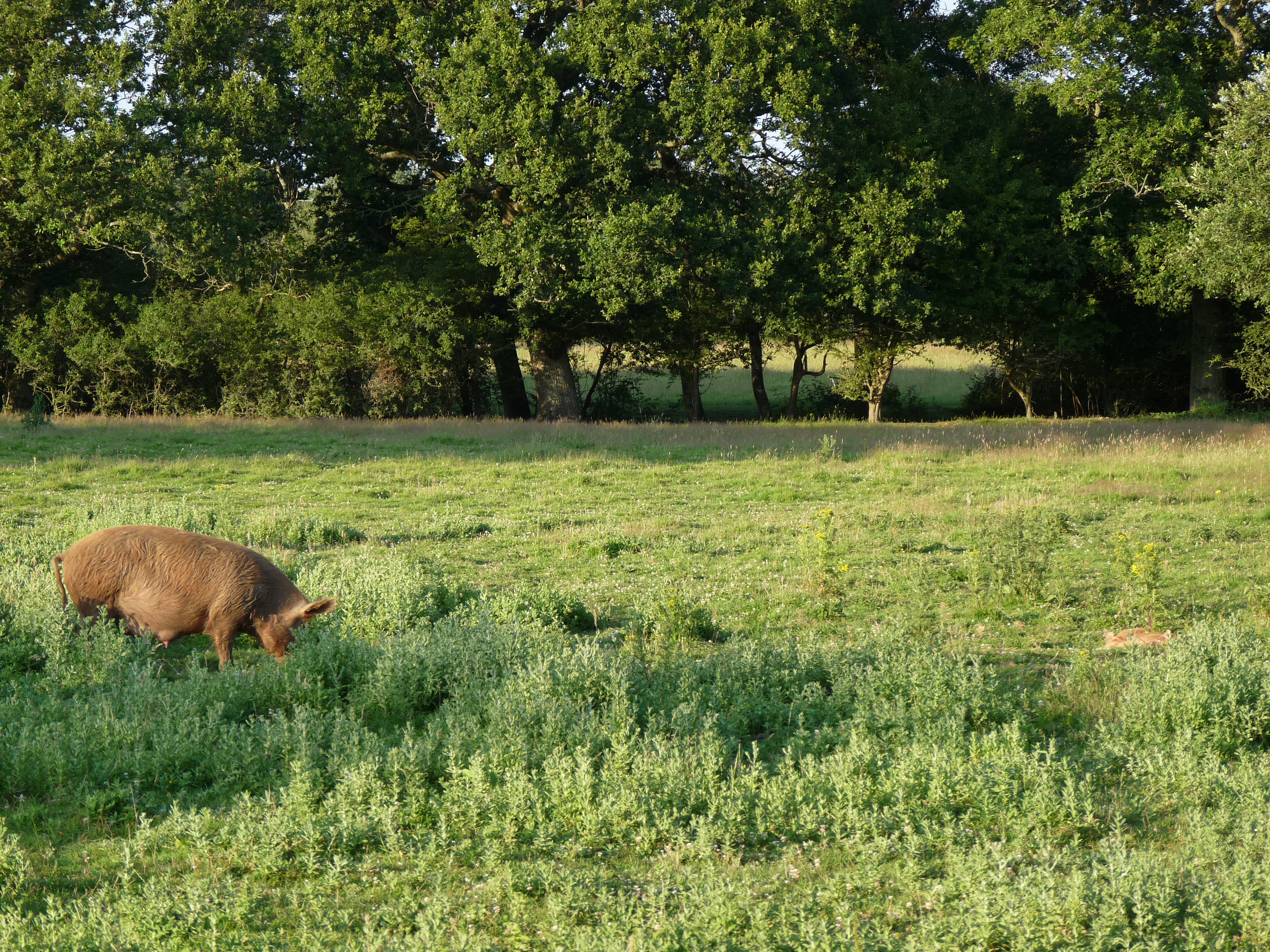
Tamworth sow with piglets at Knepp Wildland

After inheriting the 3,500-acre (1,400 ha) farm at Knepp from his grandparents at the age of 21 in 1987, Sir Charles Burrell, 10th Baronet, tried for 17 years to run the farm profitably. In 2000, he decided to sell the dairy herd and farm equipment to clear debts rather than take on even more debt in yet another attempt to increase productivity. The turning-point came in 2001, when he received Countryside Stewardship funding to restore the 350-acre (140 ha) Repton-designed parkland around the mansion; parkland that had been ploughed since World War II.

In 2001, the 370-acre (150-hectare) Repton park around the old castle was seeded with grass and a local wild meadow seed mix; by the end of the year all the internal fences had been removed from the park and deer from Petworth House had been introduced.

Further inspired by a visit to the Oostvaardersplassen nature reserve in the Netherlands in 2002 and by the work of Dutch ecologist Dr Frans Vera, Burrell set about establishing a 'hands-off', naturalistic grazing system across the entire estate. He used free-roaming herds of old English Longhorn cattle, Exmoor ponies and Tamworth pigs as proxies for the aurochs, tarpan and wild boar that would once have roamed the British countryside, as well as red and fallow deer.

In 2003, the project received additional funding from the Countryside Stewardship Scheme, to extend the park restoration to all of the areas known as the Middle Block and the Northern Block. English Longhorn cattle were added in the same year. along with six Exmoor ponies. Two Tamworth sows followed, along with a further 23 Longhorn cattle in the Northern Block in 2004.

By 2006, 1,100 acres (450 ha) of the area known as the Southern Block had been left completely unmanaged for between one and six years. The first meeting of a steering group for the project was held the same year.

In 2009, ravens nested at Knepp for the first time in hundreds of years; 13 out of a total of 18 UK bat species were recorded that summer along with 15 'UK Biodiversity Action Plan Priority Species' (four bats and 11 birds), 60 invertebrate species of conservation importance, and 76 additional species of moths. By March 2009, a 9-mile (14 km) perimeter fence around the Southern Block had been completed and 53 Longhorn cattle were introduced to the area, followed shortly afterwards by 23 Exmoor ponies, 20 Tamworth pigs and 42 fallow deer. Purple emperor butterflies were spotted for the first time at Knepp that year, and by 2015 it had become the largest breeding colony of purple emperors in the country.

In 2010, the project received Higher Level Environmental Stewardship funding, by which time Knepp was supporting some 1% of all nesting nightingales in the UK, only nine years into the project.

By 2011, there were 11 singing male turtle doves at Knepp. 2016 saw the first pair of breeding falcons. In the same year, work was carried out on the River Adur within the project boundaries to remove the artificial banks and allow the river to flood the surrounding meadows in a more natural way. In 2012, the Environment Agency removed the largest weir and disabled the rest, and within a year sea trout were spotted migrating up the river.

In 2016 a black stork, one of the rarest birds in Western Europe, was spotted, and 441 species of moth were recorded. Between 2015 and 2016, experts recorded 62 species of bee and 30 species of wasp, including seven bee and four wasp species of national conservation importance.

White stork were observed raising chicks in the UK for the first time in 600 years at Knepp in 2020.

Beavers were re-introduced to Knepp in February 2020, having been absent from Sussex for several hundred years. One of the beavers escaped in December that year.

On 17 November 2021, the very rare vagrant emperor dragonfly (Anax ephippiger) was discovered in a field at Knepp.

== Description ==
Map

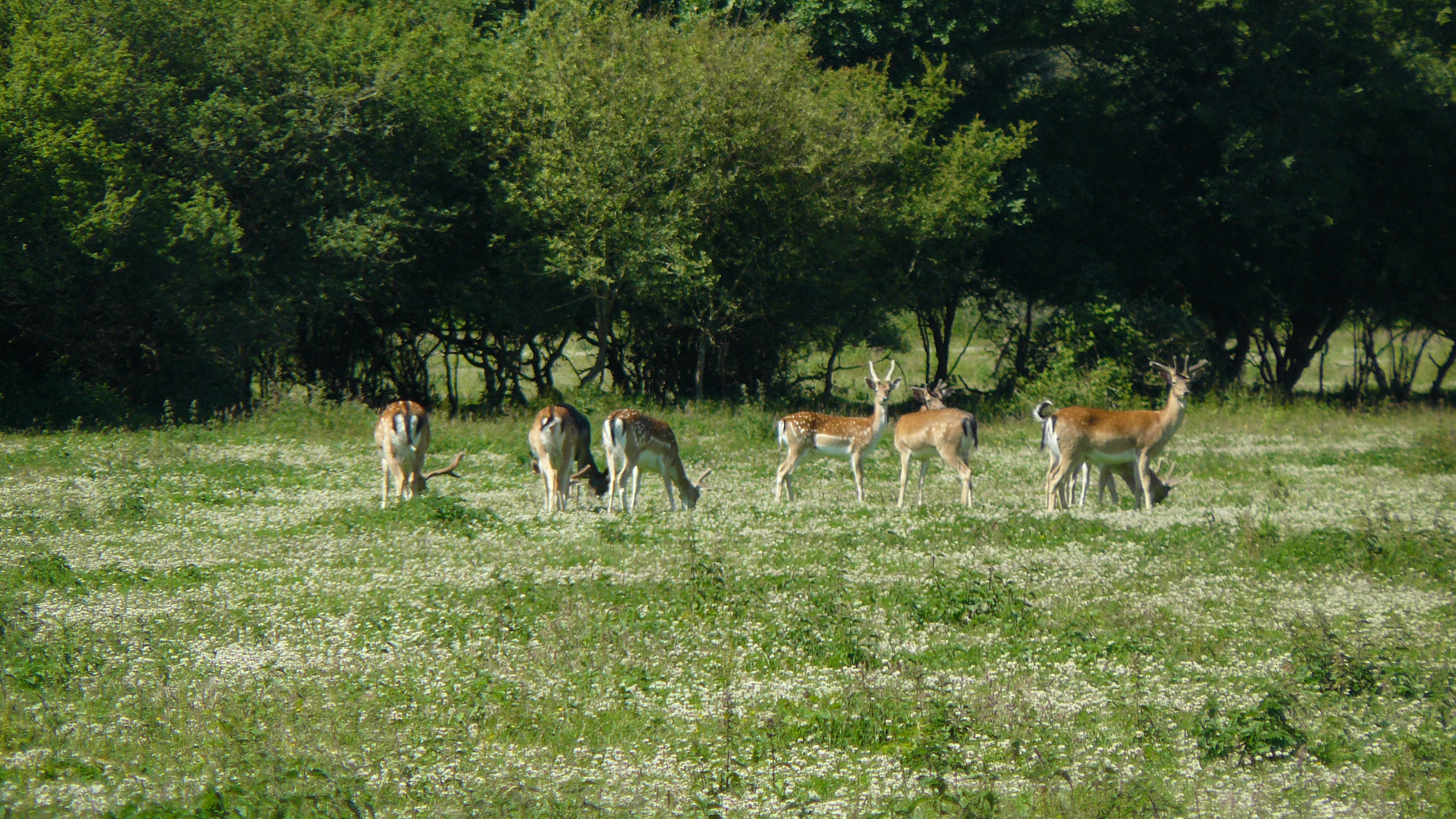
Deer grazing at Knepp Wildland

The project uses herds of free-roaming animals including Old English longhorn cattle, Exmoor ponies, Tamworth pigs, red and fallow deer to drive habitat generation, and focuses on restoring dynamic natural processes. The project has witnessed an 'extraordinary abundance' of many rare species, including turtle doves, barbastelle bats, slow-worms and grass snakes; and is now a breeding hotspot for purple emperor butterflies and nightingales.

As of 2018, a reintroduction programme of white storks to England was in its early stages on the estate, with juvenile birds being kept in a 6 1/2-acre (2.6 ha) pen until maturity, when they were released. Sussex was chosen for its strong historical associations with the stork. The programme aims to establish a breeding population in Britain for the first time since 1416.

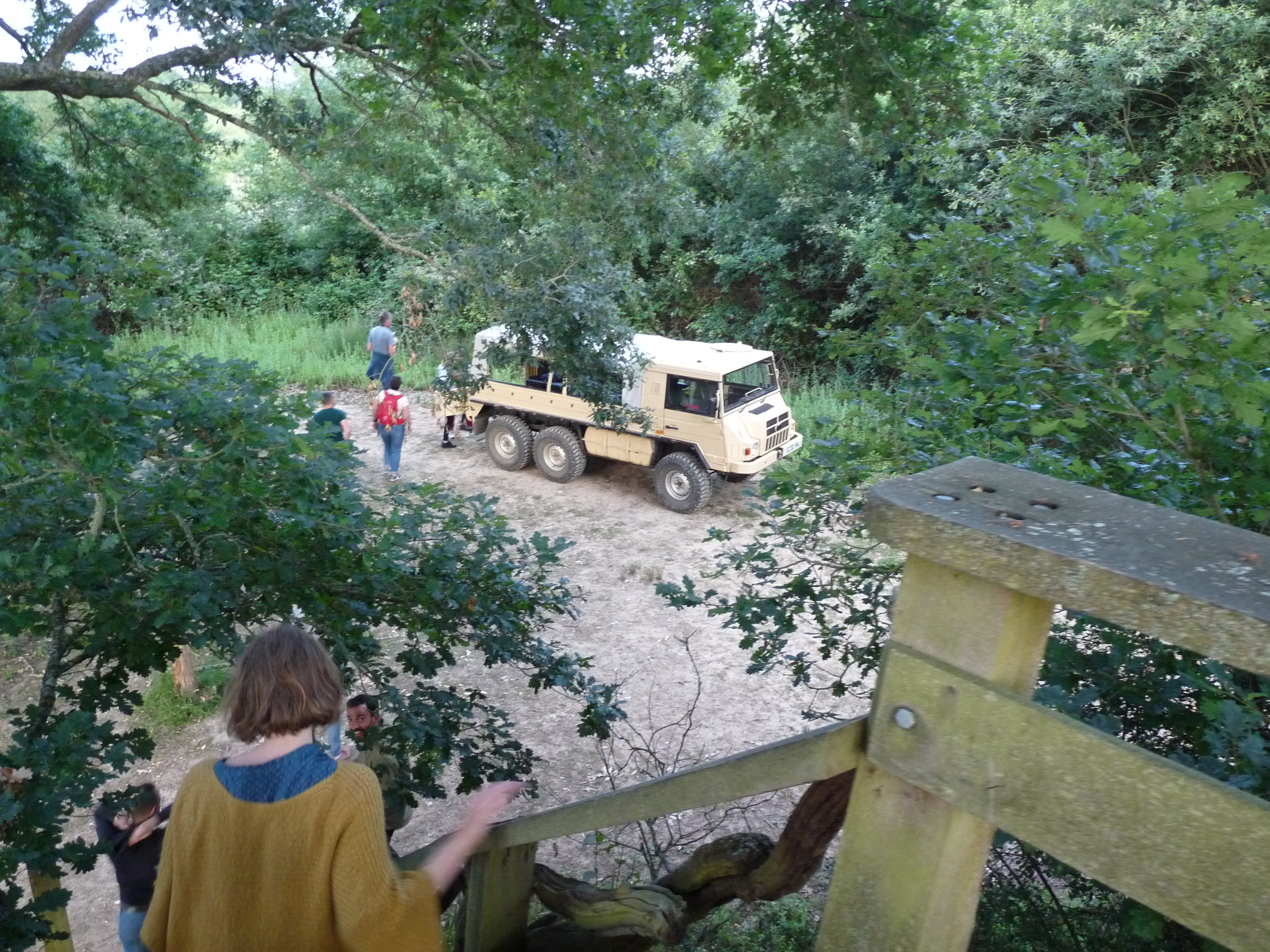
Visitors being given a tour of Knepp Wildland

The estate is still farming, albeit conservatively, producing 75 tonnes of low-input, organic, pasture-fed meat per annum from its free-roaming herds. Wildlife tourism provides another significant income stream. Knepp offers camping, safaris and holiday accommodation.

There are 16 miles (26 km) of public and permissive footpaths and five viewing platforms on the estate.

== Advisory board ==
The Knepp Wildland Advisory Board consists of some 30 ecologists, including Dr Frans Vera, and Prof Sir John Lawton, author of the 2010 'Making Space for Nature' report.

== Media and art ==
The story of the Knepp Wildland project is told in the 2018 book Wilding: The Return of Nature to a British Farm which is written by Isabella Tree, who lives at Knepp and is married to Charles Burrell and helped create the Wildland project. The 2023 film Wilding is based upon Tree's book.

Birdsongs recorded by the field-recording artist and sculptor Hazel Reeves in the Knepp Wildland inspired a musical collaboration with the pianist and composer Damian Montagu. On 5 May 2024, they released the track Knepp Dawn to mark International Dawn Chorus Day. The track celebrates the dawn chorus in the Knepp scrubland that features bird species facing cataclysmic declines elsewhere, like the nightingale, turtle dove, cuckoo, white stork. Knepp Dawn was featured on BBC Radio 4’s Today programme, Classic FM, BBC Sussex and Magic Classical.

== Awards and recognition ==
- 2015 People Environment Achievement (PEA) award for Nature
- 2015 Innovative & Novel Project award in the UK River Prize for the River Adur restoration project
- 2017 Anders Wall Award for special contribution to the rural environment in the European Union
- 2017 Gold, Best Guided Tour of the Year, Beautiful South Awards
- The Knepp Wildland project is recognised as a Verified Conservation Area (VCA) and is a member of the Rewilding Europe Network.
- Outstanding example of landscape-scale restoration in the UK Government's 25 Year Environment Plan.
- Organic certification from the Soil Association
- Sir Charles Burrell is Chair of the Beaver Advisory Committee for England and Foundation Conservation Carpathia, vice-chair for Rewilding Britain and on the board of The Arcadia Fund, Ingleby Farms Environment Committee, the Endangered Landscapes Programme and the Bronze Oak Project.

== Criticism ==
According to Isabella Tree, early on the project received letters "complaining that rewilding was an immoral waste of land, an affront to cultural values, that we'd turned our home Knepp into an eyesore of noxious weeds and brambles."

The Routledge Handbook of Rewilding writes about Knepp:

It is fortuitous for England's large landowners to have fallen upon a new business model which enables them to harvest animals as they have always done, this time with wildlife dividends. The political and economic context of the British country estate is perhaps central to the numerous quandaries owners face in relation to rewilding. They need to be profitable, and the Knepp 'safari park' formula enables them to create several income streams; meat sales and profitable access arrangements wrapped in a purportedly ethical business, in which nature recovers relative to previous agrarian land-uses. But, ultimately, will we continue to perceive this as rewilding if the country estate business case requires the preservation of landscapes little more natural than a Capability Brown parkland? Trapped by the imperative to earn or die, landowners like the Burrells do not have as much room for manoeuvre as we might imagine. Recognition of Knepp's trail-blazing innovation and bravery needs to be balanced with an appreciation of the burdens and dread of failure owning such an estate must entail.

== See also ==
- Rewilding Britain
- Wood-pasture hypothesis
