= Knepp Castle =

Castle ruin in West Sussex, England

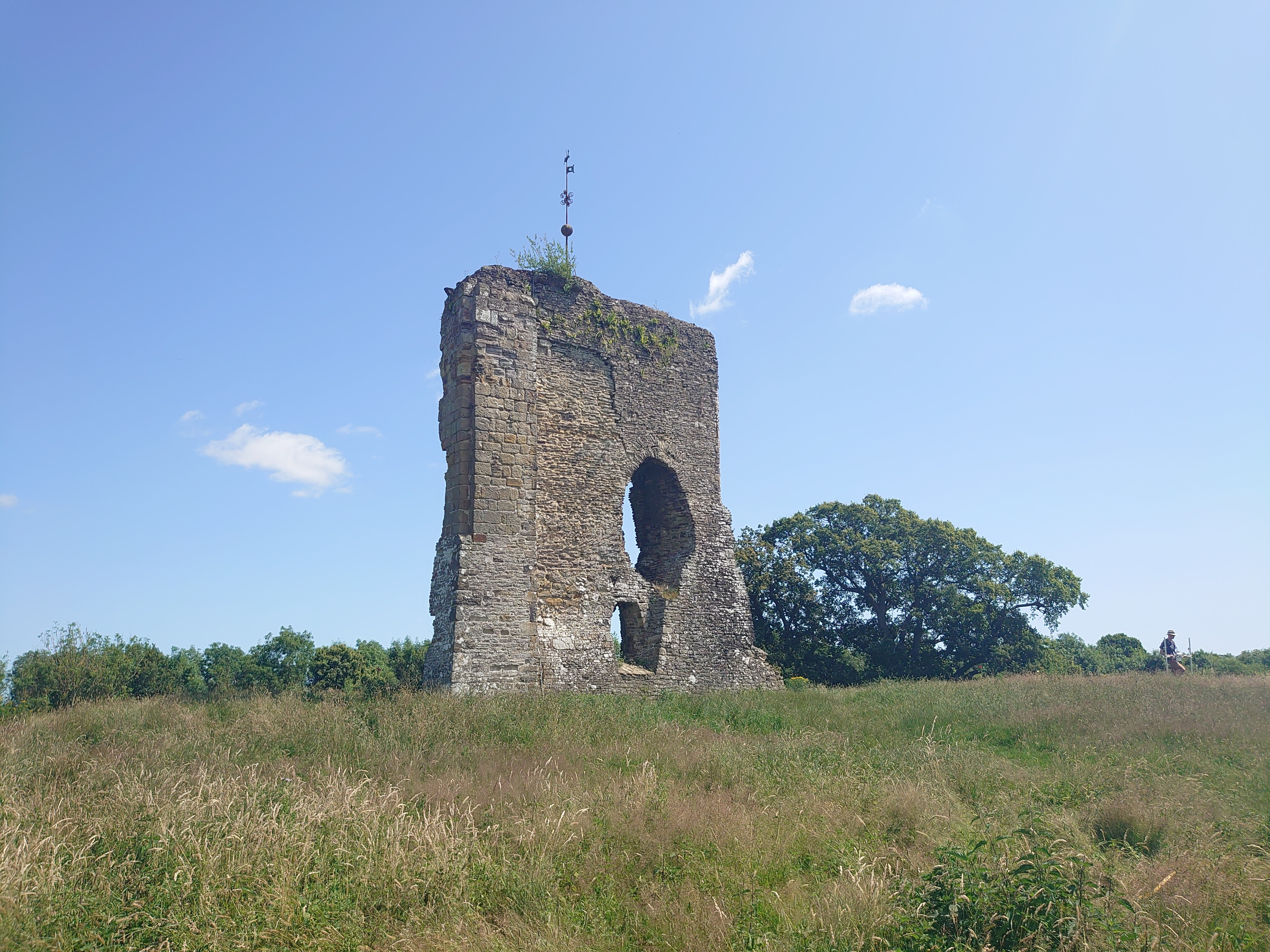
- The fragmentary remains of Knepp Castle as they stand today

General information
- Location: Shipley, West Sussex, England
- Coordinates: 50.97578°N 0.34482°W
- Construction started: 12th century (probably)
- Owner: Sir Charles Burrell, 10th Baronet

Height
- Height: 11 metres (36 ft)

Technical details
- Material: Horsham Stone

Design and construction
- Designations: Grade II listed building and scheduled monument

The medieval Knepp Castle (sometimes referred to as 'Old Knepp Castle', to distinguish it from the nearby 19th-century mansion) is to the west of the village of West Grinstead, in the parish of Shipley, West Sussex, England near the River Adur and the A24 (grid reference TQ163209). The castle was probably founded by the Braose family in the 12th century. King John confiscated the castle along with the Braose lands in 1208. Knepp was used as a hunting lodge, and John visited the castle several times. He ordered its destruction in both 1215 and 1216 during the First Barons' War.

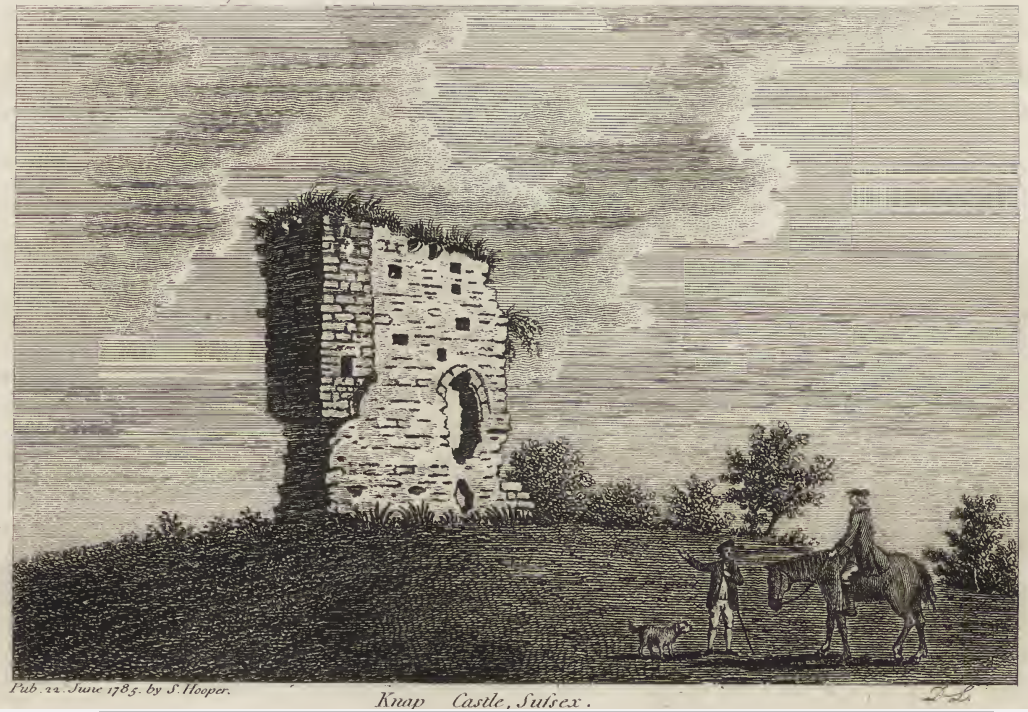
The castle in the late 18th century, as published in Francis Grose's The antiquities of England and Wales, in a similar condition to today, but with a cavity at the north end which was later shored up with a buttress.

Knepp Castle continued to be used into the 14th century and hosted reigning monarchs on several occasions. The castle eventually fell out of use, and by the early 18th century was mostly destroyed. Later that century, stone from the castle was used to build a nearby road. The land around the castle is now the site of Knepp Wildland.

== History ==
The name is thought to come from the Old English word cnæp, referring to the mound on which the castle stands.

Knepp was a motte castle, probably founded by William de Braose, 1st Lord of Bramber, in the Rape of Bramber. His descendant, William de Braose, 4th Lord of Bramber, was a favourite of King John and often accompanied the king early in his reign. In 1208 John confiscated William de Braose's land, including Knepp. While John's motivation is uncertain, he came to view William de Braose as a threat; in historian Sidney Painter's view the treatment of the Braose family was "the greatest mistake John made during his reign" because "it made his cruelty known to all his barons", and contributed to the discontent of the barons who later revolted against John's rule.

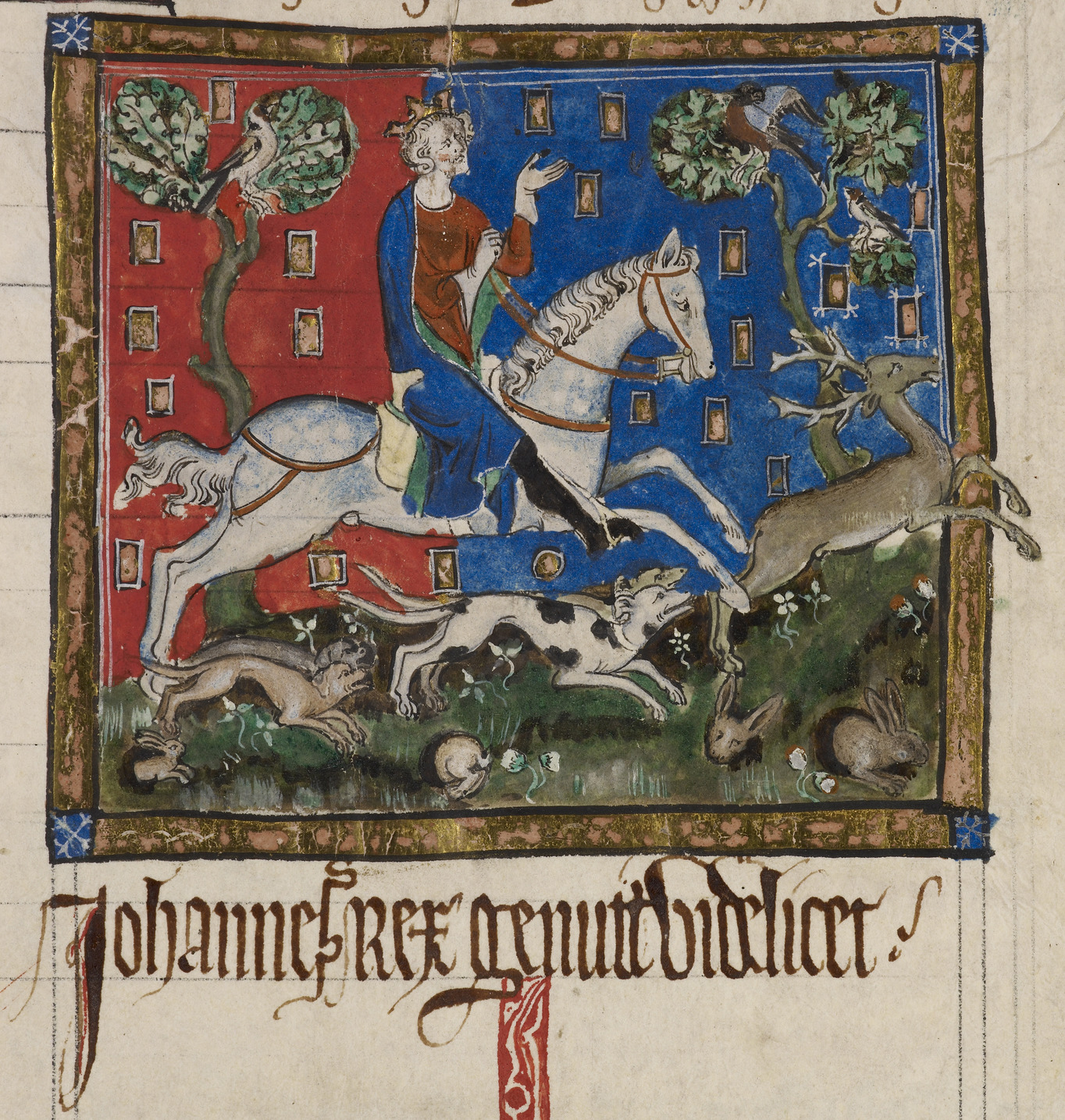
A 14th-century depiction of King John on a stag hunt. While the manuscript drawing does not depict Knepp, the park at Knepp was used for hunting in John's reign.

The first surviving record of the castle is dated to 1210. Royal records document spending at the castle in the 1210s on general repairs, building a chimney, and repairing a pond or moat. John was present at Knepp Castle on 6 April 1211, as evidenced by a charter confirmed on that date. Queen Isabella also stayed at the castle for eleven days in either 1214 or 1215.

In 1215, John was at war with the barons of England. Shortly after losing control of London, John wrote to Roland Bloett on 18 May instructing him to remove whatever he could carry from Knepp and send it to Bramber Castle, and then "totally destroy" (slight) Knepp Castle. Four days later the king again wrote to Roland, this time instructing him to welcome the Earl of Surrey, William de Warrene, at the castles of Knepp or Bramber; the historian Richard Symonds suggests this means the earlier destruction order was not followed. The sealing of Magna Carta in June 1215 brought a lull in hostilies that would prove to be temporary. Giles de Braose, Bishop of Hereford, had joined the rebellion against John and negotiated the return of the Braose family's lands in exchange for a fine in October 1215, but died before the transfer was complete and the lands remained with the king. On 13 June 1216, during renewed conflict between the king and the barons, John issue a second order to destroy the castle, instructing Roland Bloett to "cause the castle of Cnappe [Knepp], without delay, to be burnt and destroyed".

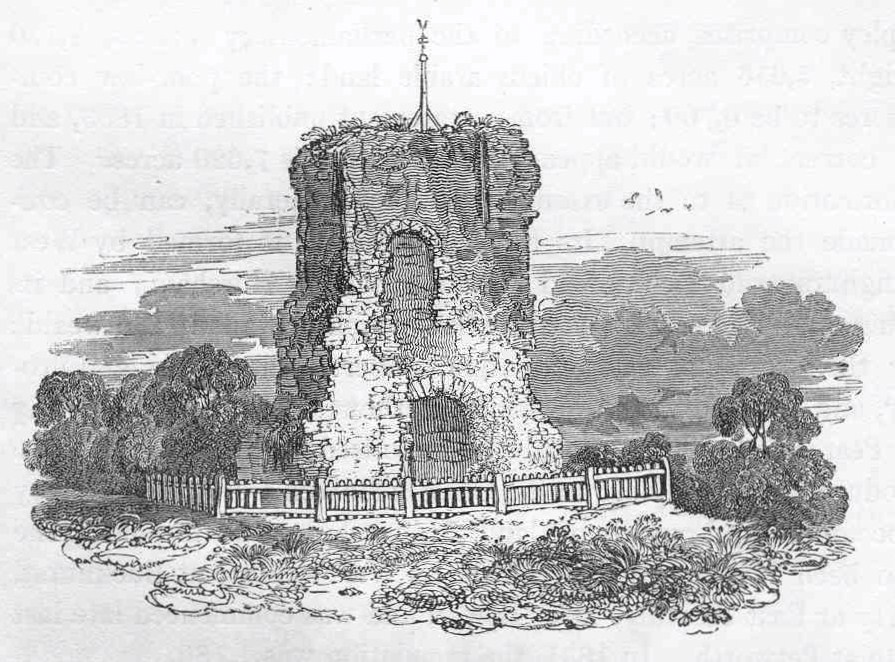
An early 19th-century engraving showing the fence around the castle and the lightning rod.

After King John died in October 1216, his son was crowned as Henry III and many barons changed sides in the war, supporting Henry against Prince Louis of France who had arrived in England with a claim to the throne and initially at the invitation of the rebelling barons. In early 1217, William Marshal, travelled through southern England dealing with Louis' supporters; Knepp Castle surrendered to Marshal during this phase of the war.

In addition to John the castle had a succession of royal visitors, including Henry III in 1218, Edward II in 1324 and Richard II in 1384. In the 13th century, Simon de Montfort seized Knepp Castle from William de Braose, and later returned it. Subsequently, it fell into decline and deteriorated.

=== Later history ===
The 19th-century mansion also known as Knepp Castle.

A skirmish may have taken place near Knepp Castle during the English Civil War, referred to as the 'Battle of Knepp' by Sir Charles Burrell. The event was related by James Charles Michell, a member of the Sussex gentry, in the early 19th century as a piece of oral history handed down from his father. According to Michell a parliamentarian force defeated a royalist force on 19 July 1648. Michell also reported that a cannonball had been found near the castle, but did not state when or give a precise location. Symonds suggests that the event caused considerable damage to the castle and contributed to its abandonment, though the Victoria County History of Sussex notes that it is unclear when the castle was destroyed. The bulk of the castle had been pulled down by the 1720s.

Ownership of the castle was linked to the manor of Knepp. In 1788 the manor was purchased by Sir Charles Raymond, and on his death in the same year his property passed to his two daughters, Sophia and Julia. Sophia was married to the antiquarian Sir William Burrell who purchased Julia's half of the inherited land. Knepp then descended through the Burrell family. Antiquarian Francis Grose visited the ruins in 1775, and wrote "so completely has been the work of demolition in the instance of this castle, that a reasonable conjecture cannot be hazarded from a view of the ruins themselves, as they then appeared, of its original form and extent". About 55 years later the Rev. Edmund Cartwright observed that the ruins had further deteriorated, with stone from the castle taken to be used in roadmaking. In the early 19th century the remnants were reinforced and fenced in by Sir Charles Burrell to protect them from further deterioration.

The name 'Knepp Castle' is also applied to the castellated Gothic Revival mansion built nearby in the early 19th century by Sir Charles Merrik Burrell, to the designs of John Nash, and currently the home of Sir Charles Burrell, 10th Baronet.

In 1951, the castle was designated a scheduled monument, a scheme intended to protect nationally important archaeological sites. The protected area covers the whole of the mound and a section of path leading west from the castle. The wall on top of the motte was given additional protection in 1959 when it was designated a Grade II listed building. Damage to the mound was reported to the Worthing Museum in 1962.

Volunteers during the 2026 excavation

The Society for Medieval Archaeology funded geophysical surveys at the castle in 2021 and 2022, with the aim of finding out more about the layout of the castle and searching for evidence of burning which could relate to King John's orders to burn Knepp. While no evidence of burning was found, the surveys did find possible buried archaeology.

== Layout ==
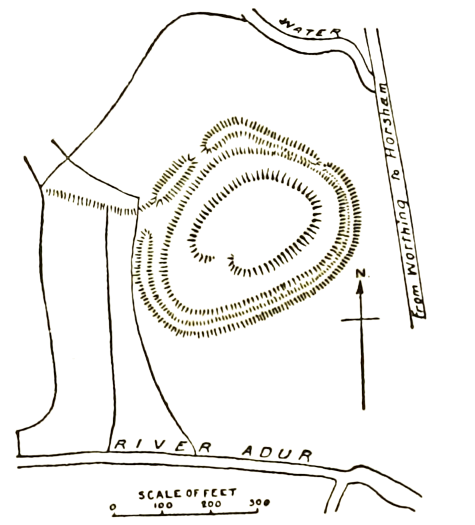
A plan of the castle published in the Victoria County History of Sussex in 1905

The castle stands on an oval mound, modelled from a natural feature, surrounded by a ditch and ramparts. The ditch, fed from a nearby pond, formed a moat which still contained water at the beginning of the 18th century. The moat was crossed by a causeway which still survives, extending west from the castle. The causeway is part of the scheduled area.

The above-ground remains of the castle consist of a single wall 11 metres high, 9.5 metres long, and 2.5 metres thick, with a doorway and another opening above it. This wall apparently formed the north end of the west wall of a tower or keep. The wall is faced with Horsham Stone, a type of sandstone found in the region.

Thirteenth and fourteenth century documents record a chapel, and domestic structures including a hall and stables at the castle, though they do not mention the arrangement of the buildings and whether they were standalone structures.

== Knepp Wildland ==
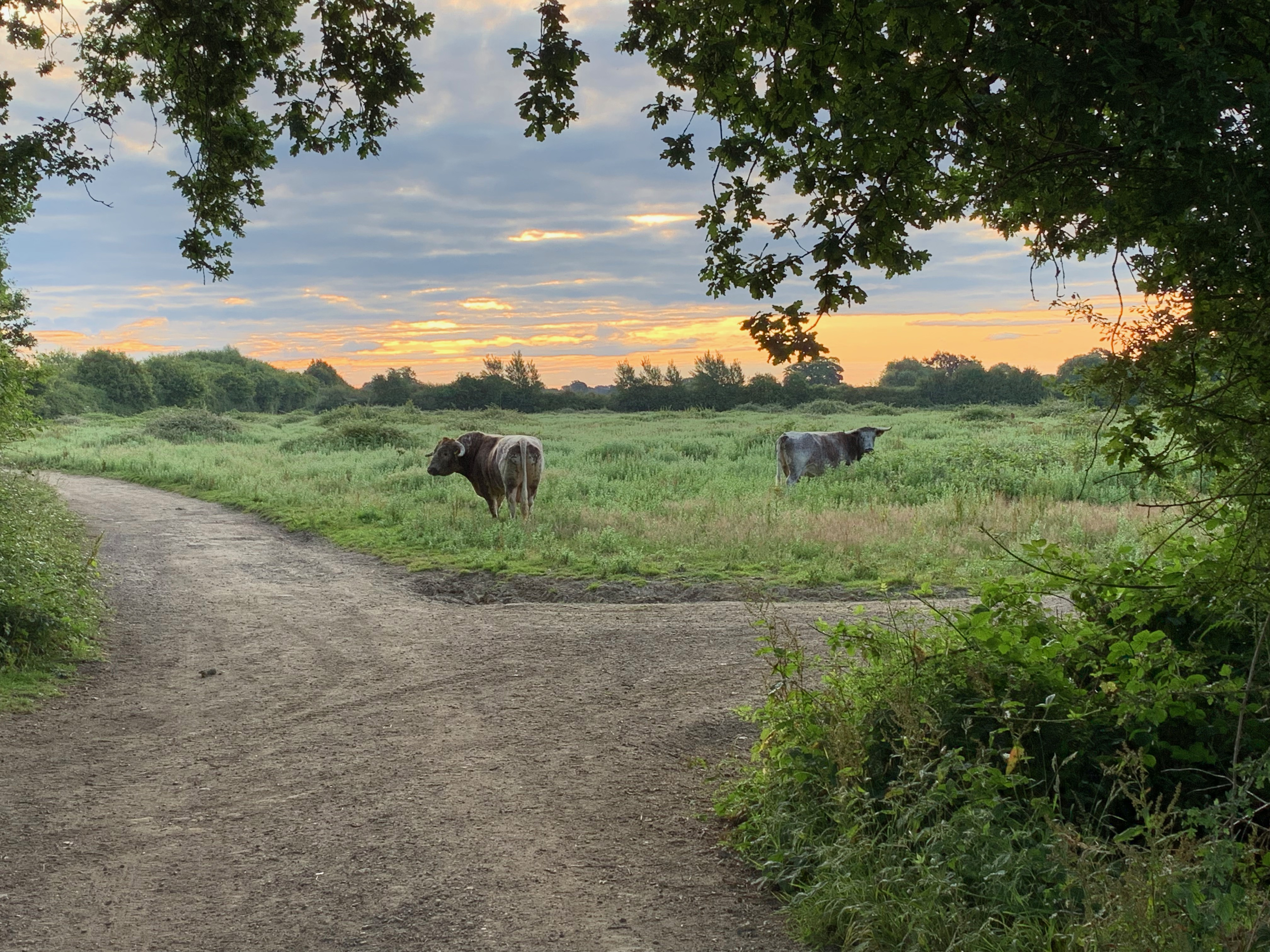
Longhorn cattle at Knepp Wildland

The land around the castle is now the site of Knepp Wildland, the first large-scale rewilding project in England, created from 1,400 hectares or 3,500 acres of former arable and dairy farmland owned by Sir Charles Burrell, 10th Baronet.
