= Wood-pasture hypothesis =

Ecological theory

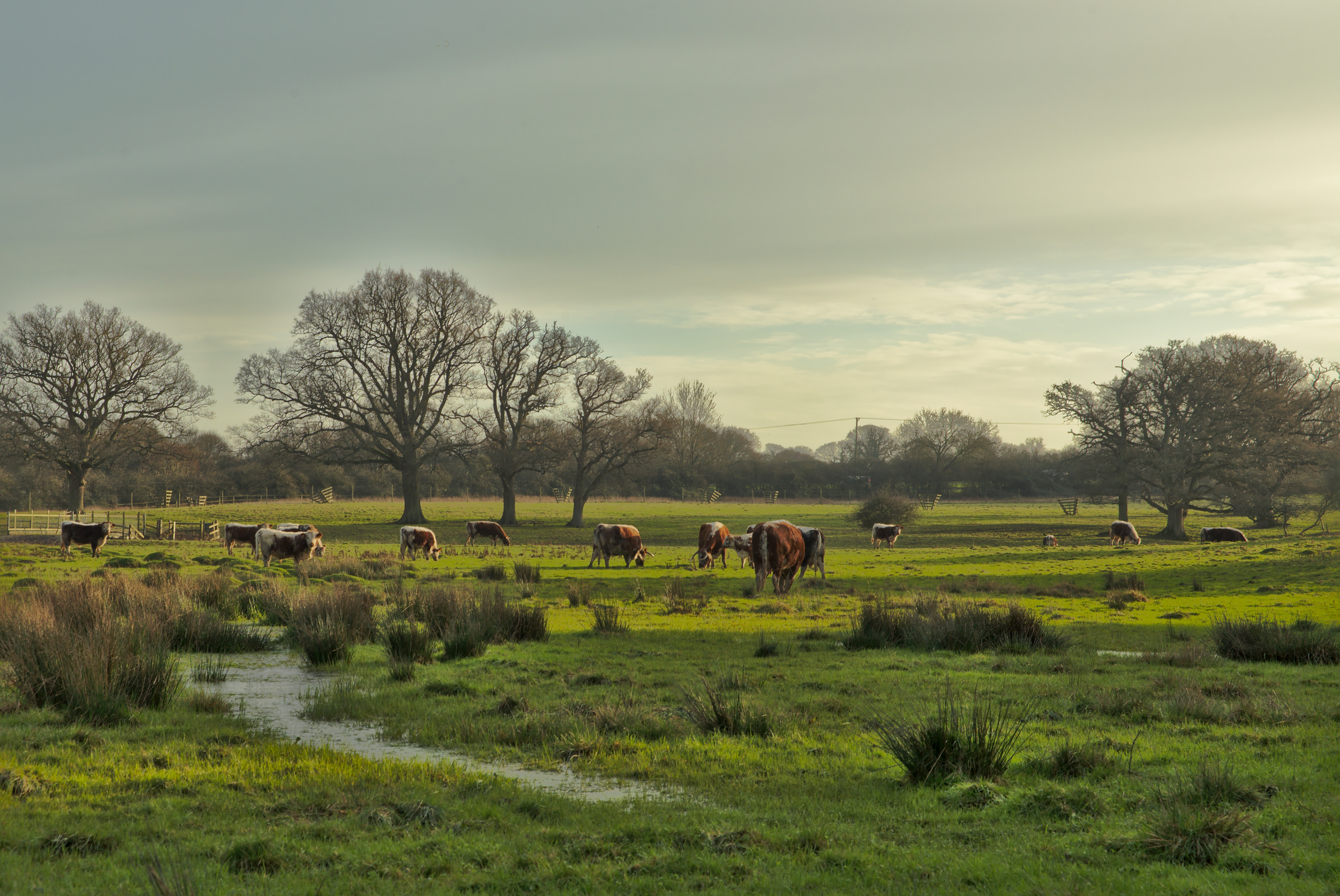
Free-ranging Longhorn cattle, stands of mature oaks in the distance, Knepp Wildland.

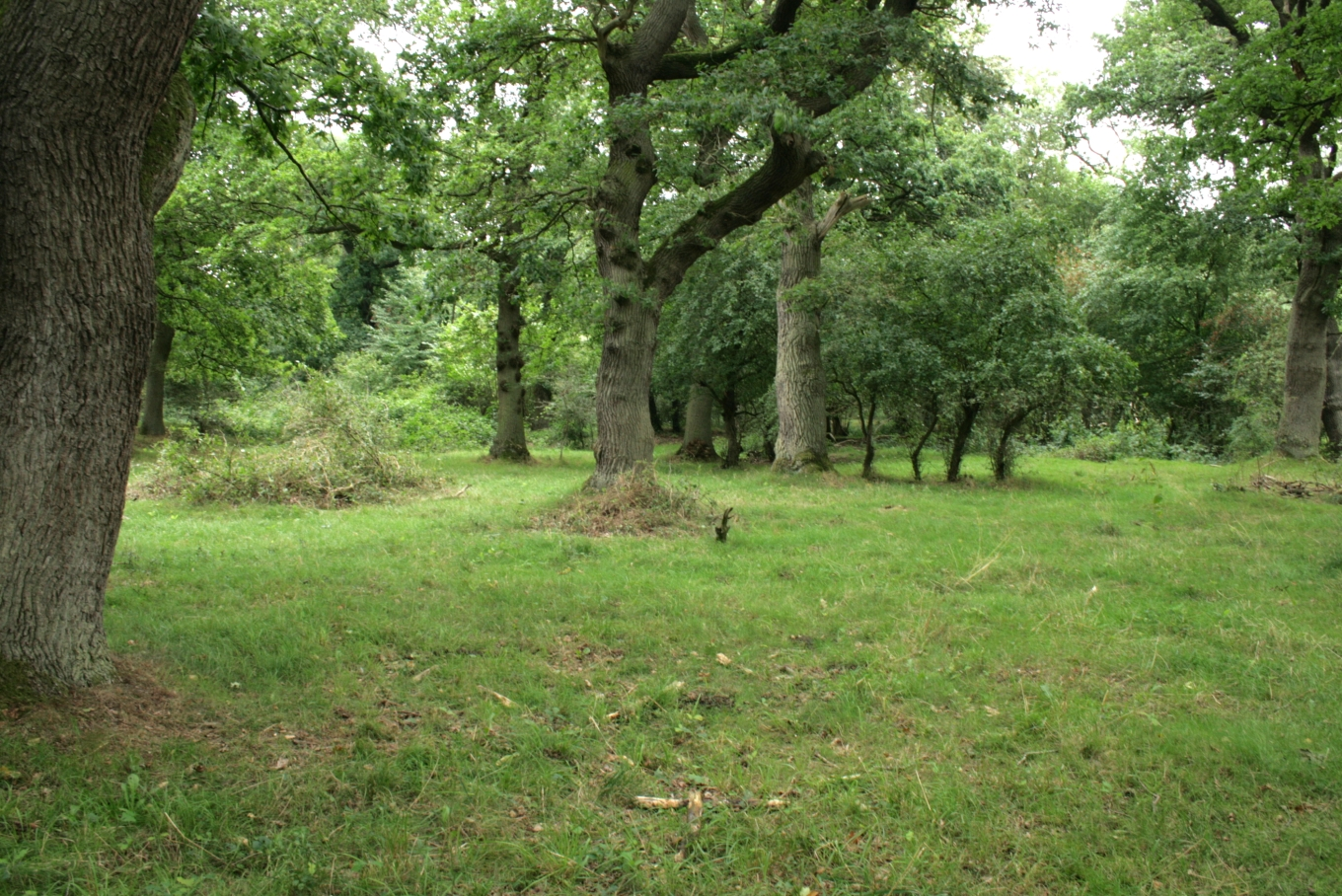
According to the hypothesis, open wood-pasture like this one in Langå Egeskov, Jutland, Denmark comes close to a European virgin vegetation.

The wood-pasture hypothesis (also known as the Vera hypothesis and the megaherbivore theory) is a scientific hypothesis positing that open and semi-open pastures and wood-pastures formed the predominant type of landscape in post-glacial temperate Europe, rather than the common belief of primeval forests. The hypothesis proposes that such a landscape would be formed and maintained by large wild herbivores. Although others, including landscape ecologist Oliver Rackham, had previously expressed similar ideas, it was the Dutch researcher Frans Vera, who, in his 2000 book Grazing Ecology and Forest History, first developed a comprehensive framework for such ideas and formulated them into a theory.

Vera's proposals, although controversial, came at a time when the role grazers played in woodlands was increasingly being reconsidered, and are credited with ushering in a period of increased reassessment and interdisciplinary research in European conservation theory and practice. Although Vera largely focused his research on the European situation, his findings could also be applied to other temperate ecological regions worldwide, especially the broadleaved ones.

Vera's ideas have met with both rejection and approval in the scientific community, and continue to lay an important foundation for the rewilding-movement. While his proposals for widespread semi-open savanna as the predominant landscape of temperate Europe in the early to mid-Holocene have at large been rejected, they do partially agree with the established wisdom about vegetation structure during previous interglacials. Moreover, modern research has shown that, under the current climate, free-roaming large grazers can indeed influence and even temporarily halt vegetation succession. Whether the Holocene prior to the rise of agriculture provides an adequate approximation to a state of "pristine nature" at all has also been questioned, since by that time anatomically modern humans had already been omnipresent in Europe for millennia, with in all likelihood profound effects on the environment.

The severe loss of megafauna at the end of the Pleistocene and beginning of the Holocene known as the Quaternary extinction event, which is frequently linked to human activities, did not leave Europe unscathed and brought about a profound change in the European large mammal assemblage and thus ecosystems as a whole, which probably also affected vegetation patterns. The assumption, however, that the pre-Neolithic represents pristine conditions is a prerequisite for both the "high forest theory" and the Vera hypothesis in their respective original forms. Whether or not the hypothesis is supported may thus further depend on whether or not the pre-Neolithic Holocene is accepted as a baseline for pristine nature, and thus also on whether the Quaternary extinction of megafauna is considered (primarily) natural or man-made.

Vera's hypothesis has important repercussions for nature conservation especially, because it advocates for a reorientation of emphasis away from the protection of old-growth forest (as per the competing high forest theory) and towards the conservation of open and semi-open grasslands and wood pastures, through extensive grazing. This aspect in particular has attracted considerable attention, and has made Vera's hypothesis an important point of reference for conservation grazing and rewilding initiatives. The wood-pasture hypothesis also has points of contact with traditional agricultural practices in Europe, which may conserve biodiversity in a similar way to wild herbivore herds.

== Names and definitions ==
Frans Vera's hypothesis has many names, since Vera himself did not provide a distinguished name for it. Instead, he simply referred to it as the alternative hypothesis, alternative to the high-forest theory, which he called the null hypothesis. As a result, it has been called by many names over the years, including the wood-pasture hypothesis, the wooded pasture hypothesis, the Vera hypothesis, the temperate savanna hypothesis and the open woodland hypothesis. Especially in Continental Europe, it is commonly known as the megaherbivore hypothesis and literal translations of it.

Vera limited the geographic area of his ideas to Western and Central Europe between 45°N and 58°N latitude and 5°W and 25°E longitude. This includes most of the British Isles and everything between France (except the Southern third) and Poland and Southern Scandinavia to the Alps. Furthermore, he confined it to altitudes below 700 m (2,300 ft). By extension, the North American East Coast is also addressed as an analogy with a comparable climate.

== High-forest theory ==
=== Heinrich Cotta: high-forest theory ===
In his 1817 work Anweisungen zum Waldbau (Directions for Silviculture), Heinrich Cotta posited that if humans abandoned his native Germany, in the space of 100 years it would be "covered with wood". This assumption laid the foundation for what is now called the high-forest theory, which assumes that deciduous forests are the naturally predominant ecosystem type in the temperate, broad-leaved regions.

=== Frederic Clements: linear succession ===
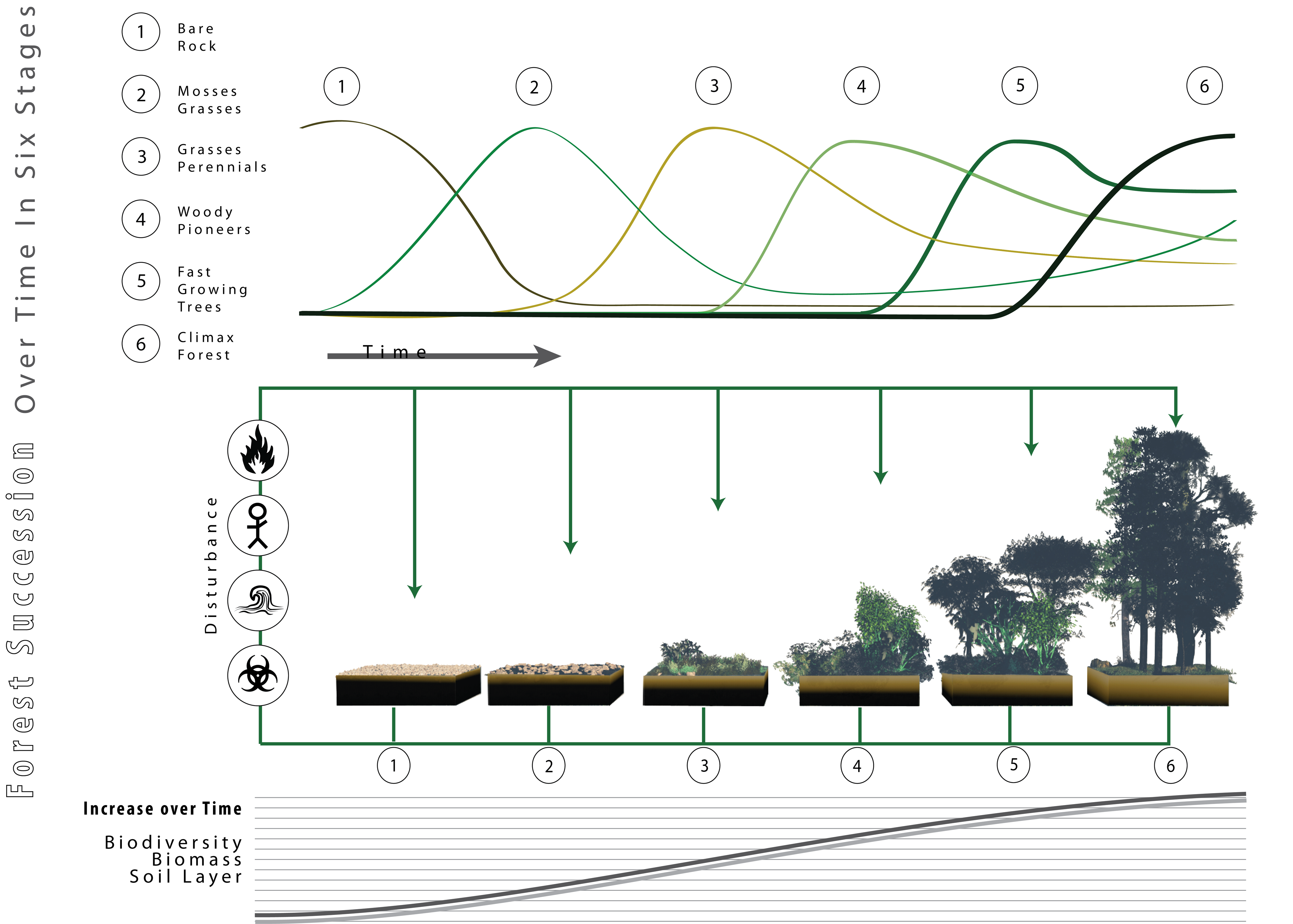
The natural succession in the temperate hemisphere as per the high-forest theory, and the characteristics associated with each phase.

Later, this position was accompanied by Clements' formulation of the theory of linear succession, meaning that under the right conditions bare ground would, over time, invariably become colonised by a succession of plant communities eventually leading to closed stands dominated by the tallest plant species. Because in most of the temperate hemisphere the potentially tallest plants are trees, the final product would therefore chiefly be forest. Albeit with changes in conceptualisation and some modifications, this concept remains the one favoured by most, and provides the conceptual framework for many forest-related methods and customs in forestry and conservation. This includes the Prozessschutz doctrine advocated by German forest-ecologist Knut Sturm, which highlights the importance of non-intervention and space of time for forest protection, as it is implemented in forest reserves such as Białowieża.

=== Further refinements ===
Clements' notion of stable climax communities was later challenged and refined by authorities such as Arthur Tansley, Alexander Watt and Robert Whittaker, who championed the inclusion of dynamic processes, like temporary collapse of canopy cover because of windthrow, fire or calamities, into Clements' framework. This, however, did not change anything about the status of the "high-forest theory" as the commonly accepted view; that without human intervention closed-canopy forest would dominate the global temperate regions as the potential natural vegetation. This is also the concept that was advocated by European plant experts like Heinz Ellenberg, Johannes Iversen and Franz Firbas.

=== The reconstruction of vegetation history ===
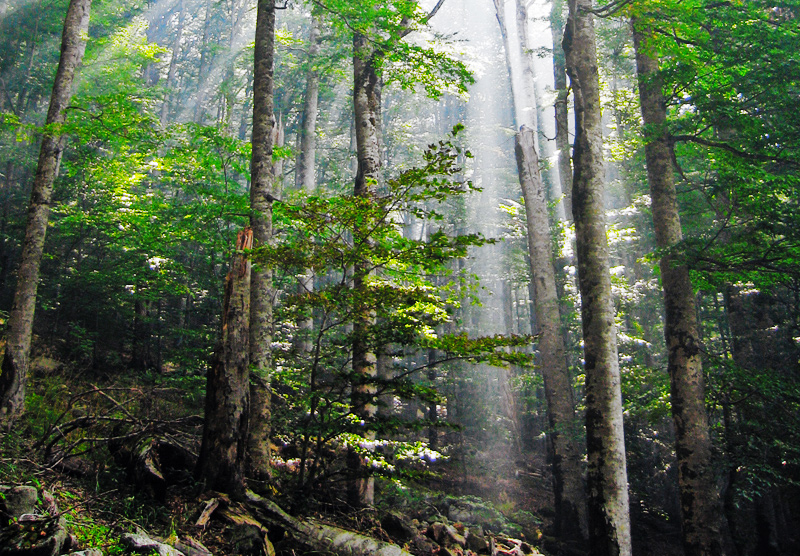
If the high-forest theory holds true, beech forests would naturally dominate temperate Europe.

Apart from theoretical considerations, this concept has relied and continues to rely heavily on both field observations and, more recently, on findings from pollen analysis, which allow inferences about the vegetation structure of past epochs. For example, vegetation trends can be reconstructed from the ratio of tree pollen to pollen associated with grassland. Pollen analysis is the most widely used means of generating historic vegetation data and the analysis of pollen data has provided a solid database from which a predominance of forest throughout the early stages of the Holocene of temperate Europe, especially the Atlantic, is generally inferred, although the possibility of regional differences remains open. On that basis, the history of vegetation in Europe is generally reconstructed as a history of forest.

Pollen analysis, however, has been criticized for its inherent bias towards wind-pollinated plant species and, importantly, wind-pollinated trees, and has been shown to overestimate forest cover. To account for this bias, a corrective model (REVEALS) is used, whose application leads to results that differ substantially from those drawn from the traditional comparison of pollen percentages alone. Alternatively to or in combination with pollen, fossil indicator organisms – such as beetles and molluscs – can be used to reconstruct vegetation structure.

=== Large herbivores and high-forest theory ===
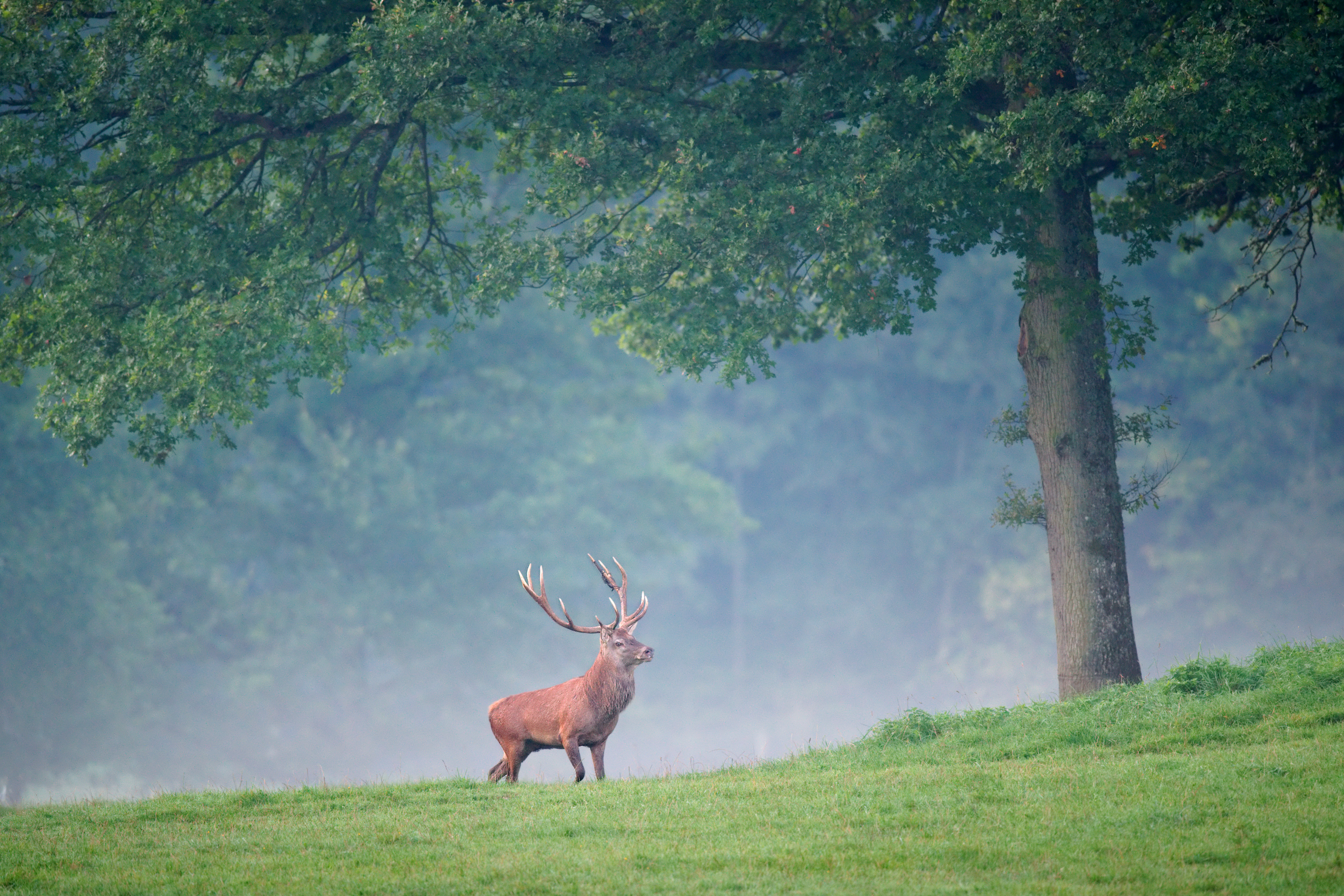
Red deer can prevent the regeneration of forest. Whether this is seen as negative or positive may depend on both the conditions and the eye of the beholder.

There is no general agreement on herbivores and their influence on succession in natural ecosystems in the temperate hemisphere. In the high-forest theory framework, wild herbivores are mostly considered as minor factors, derived from the assumption that the natural vegetation was forest. Therefore, wild herbivores were characterised by Tansley as followers of succession, not as actively influencing it, because otherwise Europe would not have been forested. From this assumption the principle was developed that the natural abundance of herbivores does not hinder forest succession, which means that herbivore numbers are necessarily considered too high once as they impede natural forest regeneration. For example, WWF Russia considers five to seven animals the optimal density of bison per 1000 ha (10 km^{2}), because if the population exceeds 13 animals per 1000 ha, first signs of vegetation suppression are observed. Consequently, the bison population in Białowieża is controlled by culling. Similarly, it is widely believed that two to seven deer per 1 square kilometre (1,000,000 m^{2}) is a sustainable number based on the assumption that if deer numbers exceed this bar, they start having a negative impact on woodland regeneration. Consequently, culling is commonly seen as necessary to reduce a perceived overabundance of deer to sustainable levels and mimic natural predation.

Others, however, have criticised this view. In a 2023 publication, Brice B. Hanberry and Edward K. Faison argued that in the eastern United States, where white-tailed deer are commonly considered overabundant due to the extirpation of wolves and cougars, there are currently no more deer than there were historically when these predators were present. Furthermore, they found that even at densities that are perceived as too high, the influence of deer may be ecologically beneficial. The assumption that population control through hunting is necessary in order to mimic the effect of natural predators is also not entirely supported by scientific analyses of natural predator-prey dynamics. Instead, the control of herbivore numbers in nature probably depends on other factors. A perhaps more important influence predators may have on prey animals is the landscape of fear their presence can create, promoting landscape heterogeneity. However, in the presence of megafauna over 1,000 kilograms (0.98 long tons; 1.1 short tons), which are largely immune to predation, even this ability is limited. Overall, how ungulate populations are controlled in nature is controversial, and food availability is an important constraint, even in the presence of apex predators.

In regions with relatively intact large-mammal assemblages in Africa and Asia, as well as in European rewilding areas where "naturalistic grazing" is practised, herbivore biomass exceeds the values commonly deemed appropriate for temperate forests many times over. Here, herbivore biomass reaches a maximum of 16,000 kilograms (16 long tons; 18 short tons) per 1 square kilometre (0.39 mi^{2}), while the mammoth steppe with an estimated 10,500 kilograms (10.3 long tons; 11.6 short tons) per km^{2} falls within a similar range. The herbivore biomass of Britain during the Eemian interglacial has been estimated as more than 15,000 kilograms (15 long tons; 17 short tons) per km^{2}, which is equivalent to more than 2.5 fallow deer per ha. Hence, the ecologist Christopher Sandom and others have suggested that the comparatively high forest cover of the pre-Neolithic European Holocene may be a consequence of megaherbivore extinctions during the Quaternary extinction event, as compared to the last interglacial in Europe with a pristine megafauna, the Eemian, the early stages of the Holocene appear to have been much more forested. According to the authors, this is unlikely to be the result of the latter's only slightly cooler climate as compared to the Eemian. However, this is also subject to debate.

==== Background: grazers and browsers ====
The impact herbivores have on the landscape level depends on their way of feeding. Namely, browsers like roe deer, elk and the black rhino focus on woody vegetation, while the diet of grazers like horse, cattle and the white rhino is dominated by grasses and forbs. Intermediate feeders, like the wisent and the red deer, fall in between. Generally, grazers tend to be more social, less selective in their food choices and forage more intensively. Therefore, their impact on vegetation composition tends to be higher, as well as their ability to maintain open spaces.

Since the extinction of the aurochs in 1627 and the wild horse around 1900, none of the remaining large wild herbivores in Europe is an obligate grazer. Similarly, domesticated descendants of aurochs and wild horse, cattle and horse, are now largely kept in stables, factory farms and close to settlements, making them effectively extinct in the landscape. What remains are browsers and mixed feeders (Note: The European fallow deer, a mixed feeder and perhaps the closest of the remaining large wild herbivores to a true grazer in Europe, is not usually considered native to temperate Europe, although closely related forms were widespread here in the past, especially during warm interglacial periods. Rather, the modern species has been introduced to much of Europe since antiquity.) – roe deer, red deer, elk, wild boar, wisent and beaver, often in low densities. Backbreeding-projects, such as the German Taurus project and the Dutch Tauros programme are addressing this issue by breeding domestic cattle that can be released into the landscape as hardy and sufficiently similar proxies to act as ecological replacements for the aurochs. Similarly, primitive horse breeds such as the Konik, Exmoor pony and the Sorraia are being used as proxies for the tarpan.

== Frans Vera ==
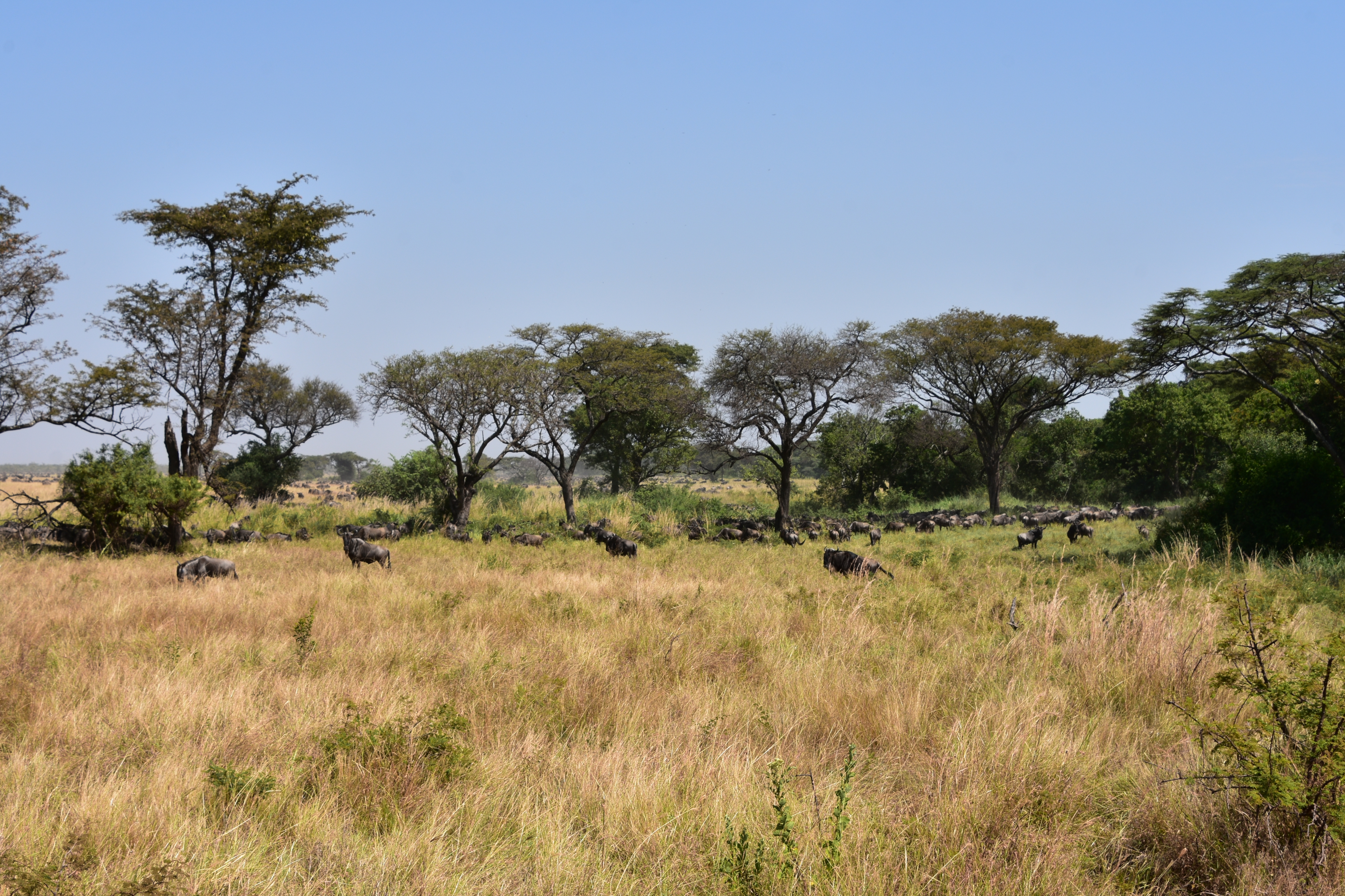
In how far African savannas are adequate to draw comparisons to the primeval European landscape remains debated.

Vera argued that the dominating landscape-type of the early to mid-Holocene was not closed forest, but a semi-open, park-like one. This semi-open landscape, he proposed, was created and maintained by large herbivores. During the Holocene, these herbivores included aurochs, European bison, red deer and tarpan. Up to the Quaternary extinctions, many other megafaunal mammals like the straight-tusked elephant or Merck's rhinoceros existed in Europe as well, that probably kept the forests open during warm interglacial periods like the Eemian interglacial. Vera also postulated that lowland forest did not emerge on a large scale before the onset of the Neolithic period and subsequent local extinctions of herbivores, which in turn allowed forests to thrive more unhindered. Indeed, investigations point to at least locally open circumstances, for example in floodplains, on infertile soils, chalklands and in submediterranean and continental areas, but maintain that forest largely dominated.

In his book Vera also discussed the decline of ancient oak-hickory-forest communities in Eastern North America. Many forests that stem from Pre-Columbian times (old-growth forests) feature light-demanding oaks and hickories prominently. However, these do not readily regenerate in modern forests; a phenomenon commonly referred to as oak regeneration failure. Instead, shade-tolerant species such as red maple and American beech dominate increasingly. While the cause is still poorly understood, a lack of natural fire is commonly presumed to play a role. Vera instead suggested that the grazing and browsing of wild herbivores, most importantly American bison, created the conditions oaks and hickories need for successful regeneration to happen, and explained the modern lack of regeneration of these species in forests with the mass-slaughter of bisons committed by European settlers.

Paleoecological evidence drawn from fossil Coleoptera deposits has also shown that, albeit rare, beetle species associated with grasslands and other open landscapes were present throughout the Holocene of Western Europe, which points to open habitats being present, but restricted. However, paleoecological data from previous interglacials when the larger megafauna was still present indicate widespread warm temperate savannah. This could mean that elephants and rhinos were more effective creators of open landscapes than the herbivores left after the Quaternary extinction event. On the other hand, traditional animal husbandry may have mitigated the effects of possibly human-induced megafaunal die-off, allowing the survival of species of the open landscape previously created and maintained by megafauna.

Frans Vera was not the first to question the high-forest paradigm. Botanist Francis Rose had expressed doubts already in the 1960s, knowing about British plant and lichen species and their light requirements. The relationship between large grazers and landscape openness, and the significance of the Quaternary extinctions of megafauna in this regard, had also been recognized prior to Vera. In 1992, for example, the archaeologist Wilhelm Schüle theorized that the genesis of closed forest in temperate Europe was the result of prehistoric man-made megafauna extinctions. Landscape ecologist Oliver Rackham, in a 1998 article entitled "Savanna in Europe", envisaged a kind of savanna as the original predominant landscape type of northwestern Europe. Vera, however, was the first to develop a comprehensive theorem to explain why forest did not dominate even in the Holocene, and to thus propose a real alternative to the high-forest theory.

In some of its aspects, the wood-pasture hypothesis bears similarity to Gradmann's steppe theory which was proposed by Robert Gradmann but challenged and refuted by scholars such as Reinhold Tüxen and Karl Bertsch.

=== Main arguments ===
==== Oak and hazel ====
Vera relies on several lines of argument based on experiments, ecology, evolutionary ecology, palynology, history and etymology. One of his main arguments is of an ecological nature; the widespread lack of successful regeneration of light-demanding tree species in modern forests. Especially the lack of regeneration of pedunculate oak, sessile oak (together hereafter addressed as "oak") and common hazel in Europe. He contrasts this reality with European pollen deposits from previous ages, where oak and hazel often form a dominant amount of pollen, making a dominance of these species in previous ages conceivable. Especially in regard to hazel, sufficient flowering is only achieved when enough sunlight is available, i.e. the plant grows outside of a closed canopy. He argues that the only explanation for the great abundance of oak and hazel pollen in previous ages is that the primeval landscape was open, and this contrast forms the principal theorem of his hypothesis. It has also been suggested that oak requires disturbances for successful establishment, disturbance large herbivores may provide.

However, pollen records from islands that lacked many of the large grazers and browsers that, according to Vera, were essential for the maintenance of landscapes with an open character in temperate Europe show almost no differences in comparison to mainland Europe. More specifically, pollen records from Holocene Ireland, which during the early Holocene was apparently, owing to a lack of fossils, devoid of any big herbivores except for abundant wild boar and rare red deer, show almost equally high percentages of oak and hazel pollen. Thus it could be concluded that large herbivores were not a required factor for the degree of openness in a landscape, and that the abundance of pollen from species that are unable to reproduce and regenerate sufficiently under a closed canopy, such as hazel and oak, can only be explained by other factors like windthrow and natural fires.

Vera's notion may be supported by observations over the course of 20 years forest regeneration in forest gaps created by windthrow, which showed that hornbeam and beech dominate the emerging stands and largely displace oaks on fertile, nutrient-rich soil. However, after the last Ice Age oak returned earlier to Central and Western Europe than beech or hornbeam, which may have contributed to its commonness, at least during the early Holocene. Still, other shade-tolerant tree species like lime and elm were equally fast returnees, and do not seem to have limited oak abundance.

On the other hand, substantial natural oak-regeneration commonly takes place outside of forests in fringe and transitional habitats, suggesting that a focus on regeneration in forests in an attempt to explain oak regeneration failure may be insufficient in regard to the ecology of Central European oak species. Rather, an underestimated reason for widespread failure of oak regeneration may be found in the direct effects of land-use changes since the early modern period, which has led to a more simplistic, homogeneous landscape, as spontaneous regeneration of both oak and hazel does frequently occur in margins, thickets, and low-grazing-intensity or abandoned pasture/arable land. Overall, oak is an adept coloniser of open areas and especially of transitional zones between vegetation zones such as forest and open grassland. Looking for regeneration within forests may therefore be futile from the outset. There is, therefore, no general "failure" in oak regeneration, but only a failure of oak regeneration within closed forests. This, however, may be expectable and natural given oak's colonising nature.

Furthermore, new species of oak mildew (Erysiphe alphitoides) observed on European oaks for the first time at the beginning of the 20th century have been cited as a possible reason for the modern lack of oak regeneration in forests, since they affect the shade tolerance, particularly of young pedunculate and sessile oaks. Although the origin of these new oak pathogens remains obscure, it seems to be an invasive species from the tropics, possibly conspecific with a pathogen found on mangos.

The life of a pasture oak
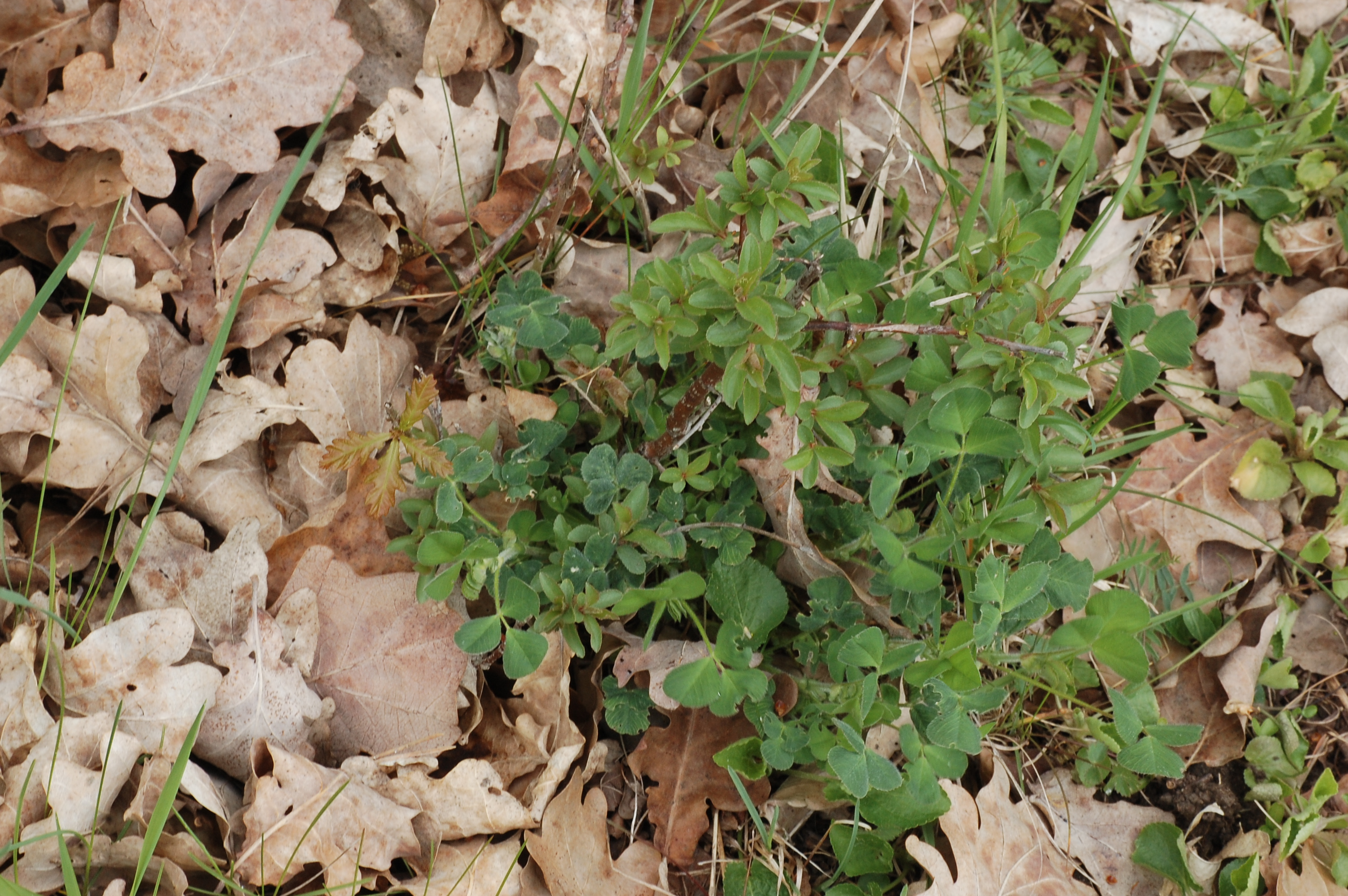
Jays commonly cache acorns close to shrubs. Oak sapling (left) growing in direct vicinity to a young blackthorn shrub.

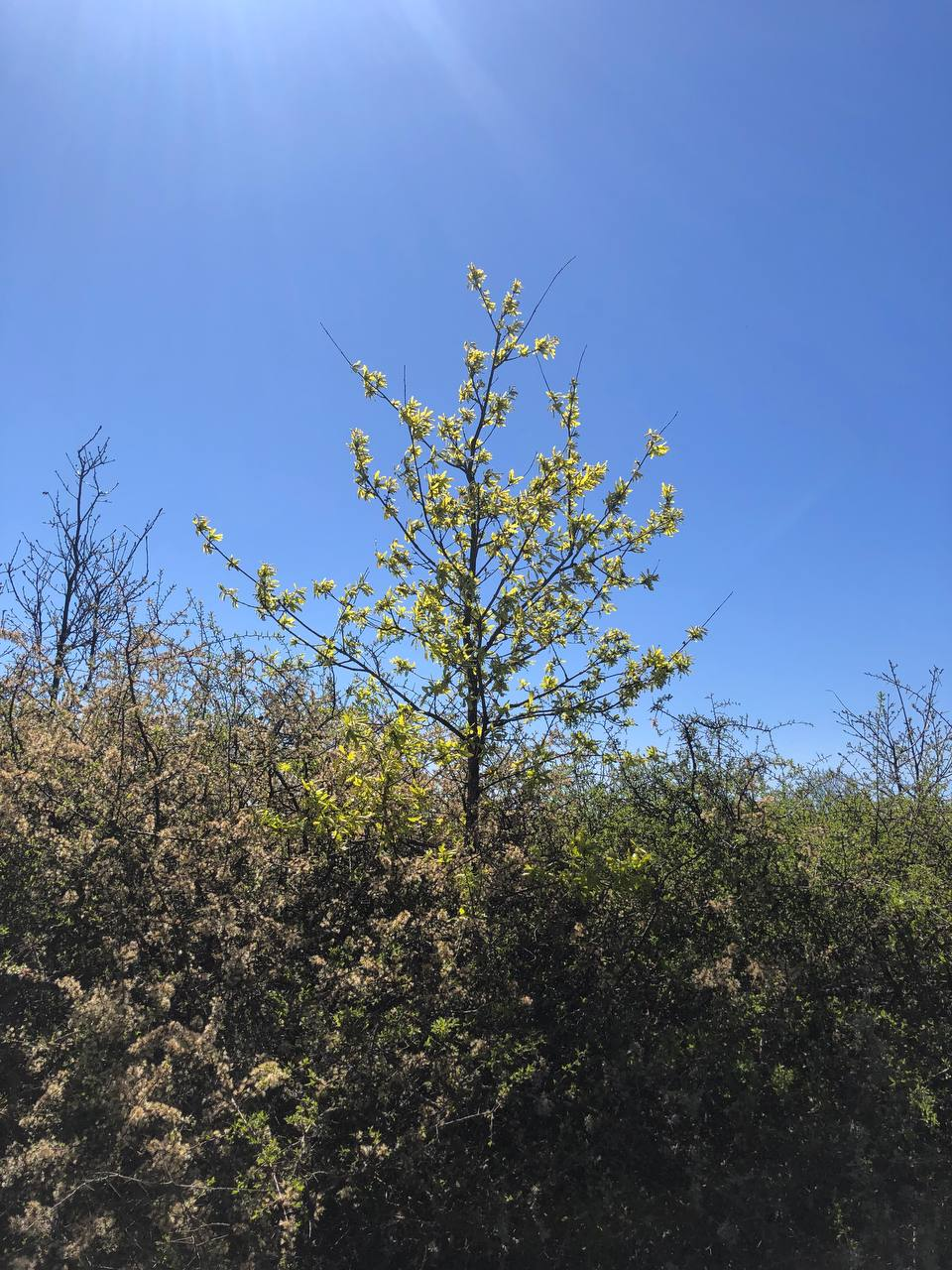
Thorny shrubs, such as blackthorn, may then act as nurse shrubs for the developing oaks.

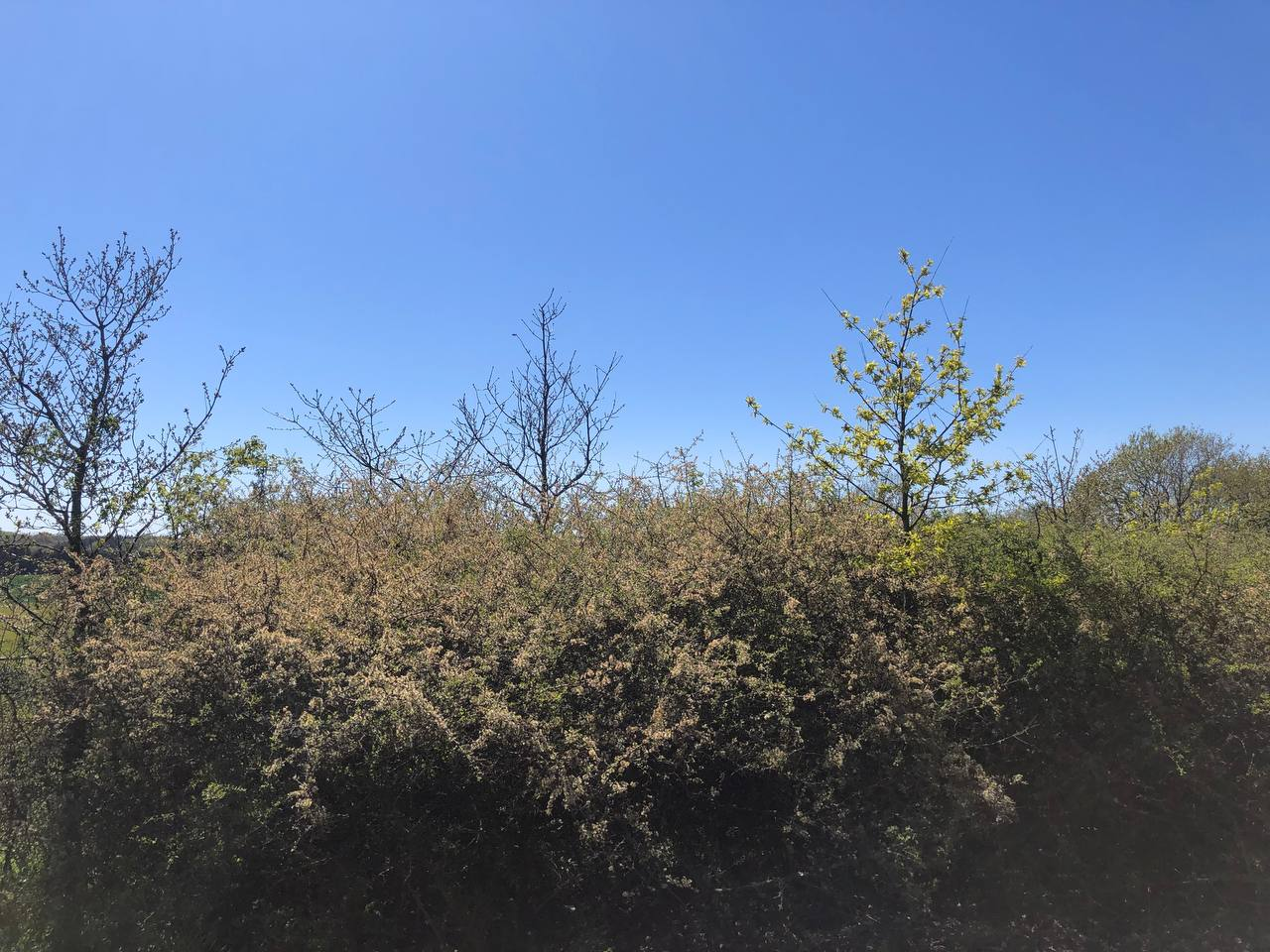
If the conditions are right, nurse shrubs may allow for the formation of tree stands dominated by oaks, via associational resistance.

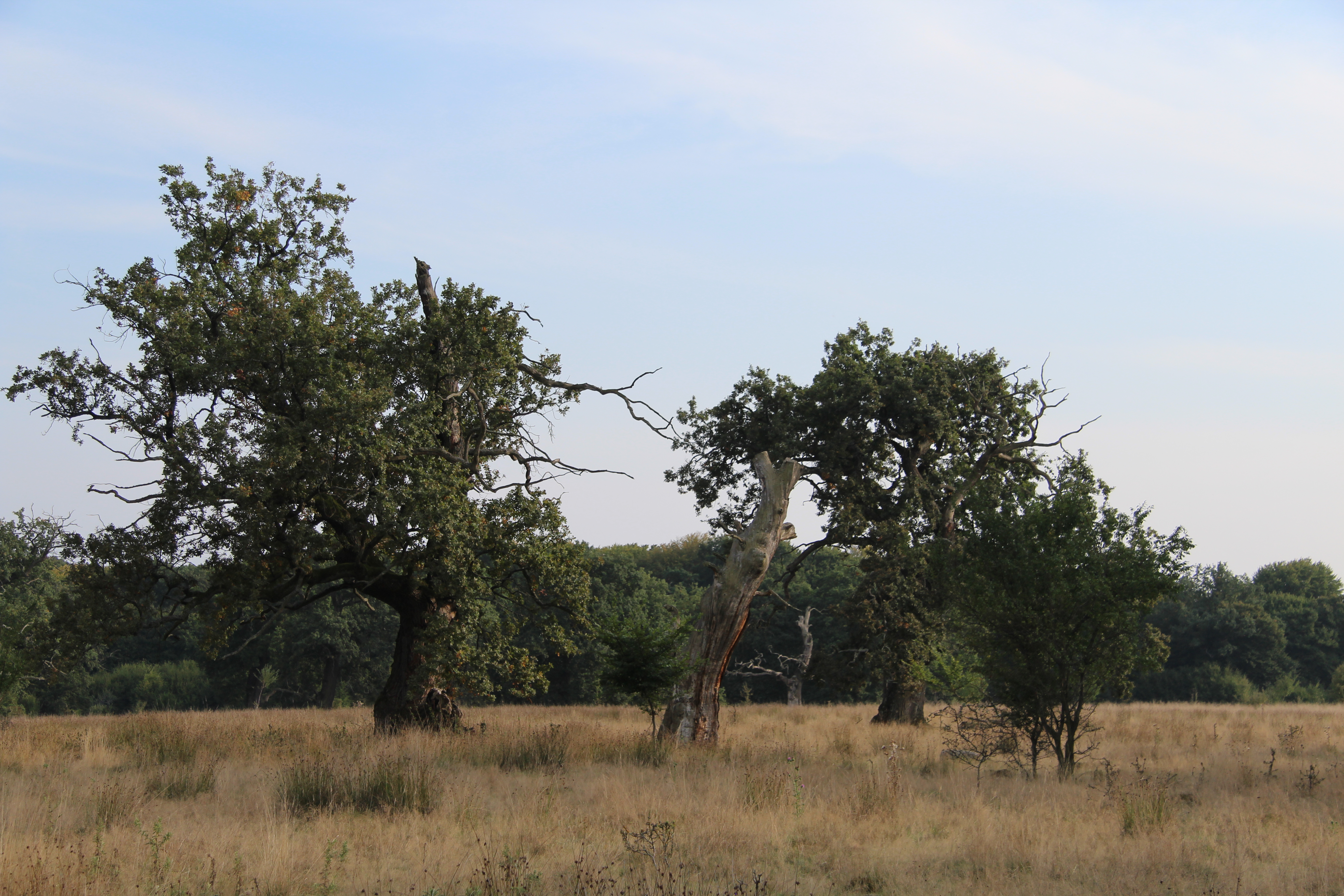
Ultimately, pasture-grown oaks, such as these pedunculate oaks in the Breite Oak Tree Reserve near Sighișoara, may form large, old solitaires. In rural landscapes, these old solitary trees are often signs of ancient silvopasture regimes.

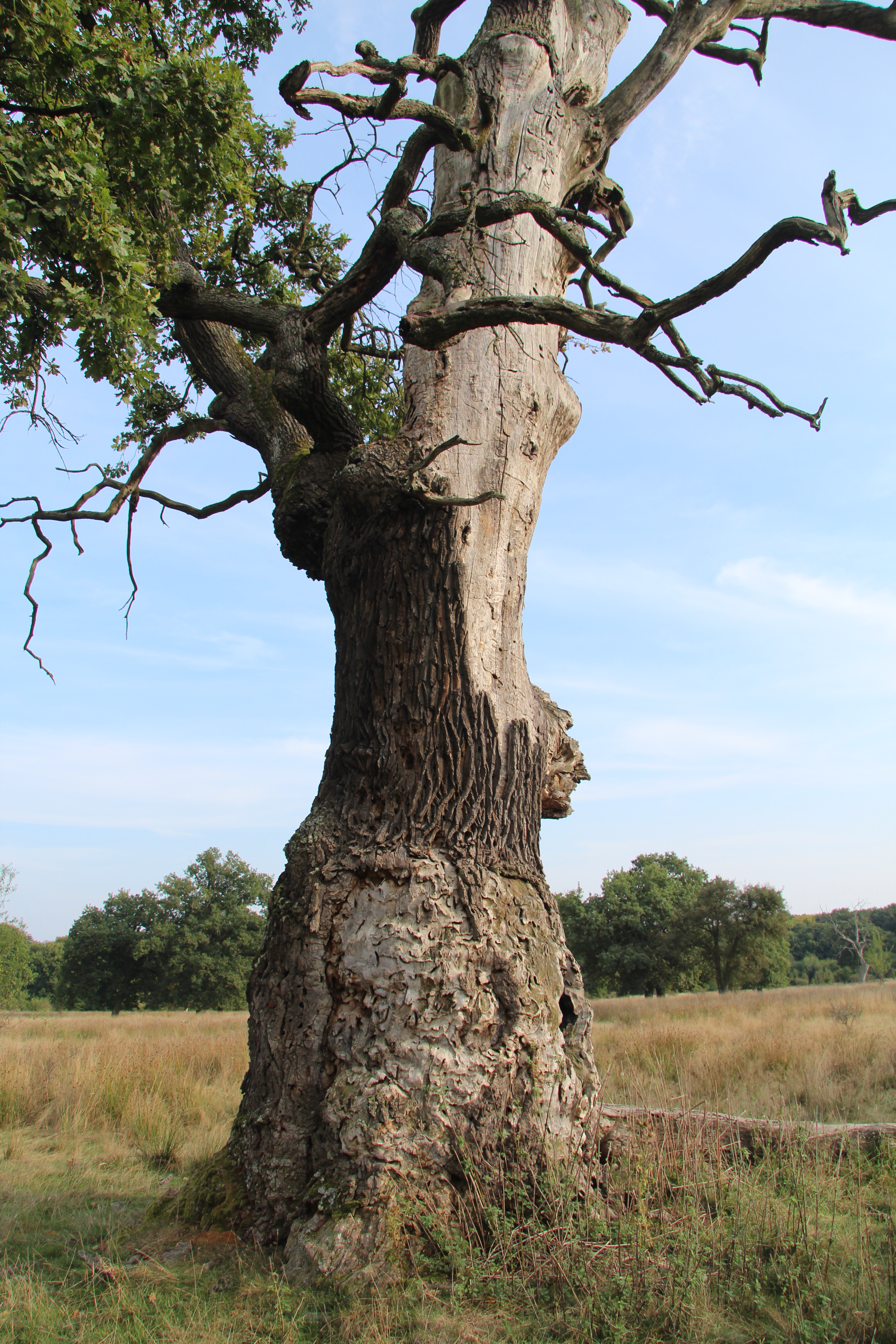
Eventually, through disease, lightning strike or old age, oaks begin to decay and die, leaving precious habitat for a variety of species.

==== Ecological anachronisms ====
Vera prominently argued that since other light-demanding and often thorny woody species exist in Europe—species such as common hawthorn, midland hawthorn, blackthorn, Crataegus rhipidophylla, wild pear and crab apple—their ecology can only be explained under the influence of large herbivores, and that in the absence of these they represent an anachronism.

==== Shortcomings of pollen analysis ====
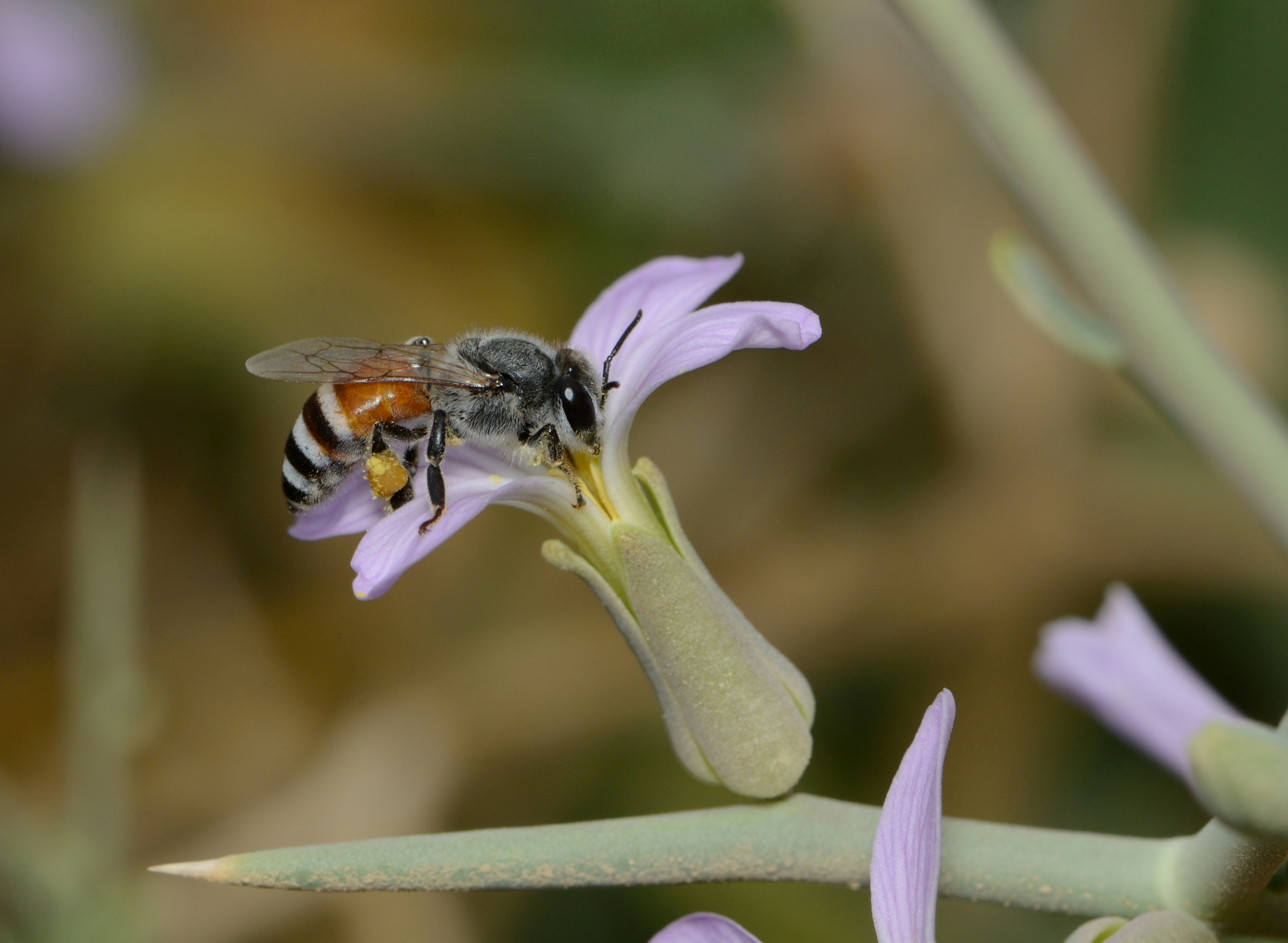
Pollen from plants that are pollinated by insects, such as here Zilla spinosa by a dwarf honey bee, rarely or never ends up in places that favour preservation, such as lakeshores. It is therefore generally underrepresented in pollen deposits.

Vera further contested that pollen diagrams can adequately display past species occurrences since, inherently, pollen deposits tend to overrepresent species that are wind-pollinated and notoriously underrepresent species that are pollinated by insects. Furthermore, he proposed that an absence of grass pollen in pollen diagrams can be explained by high grazing pressure, which would prevent the grasses from flowering. Under such conditions, he claimed, open environments with only scattered mature trees may appear as closed forests in pollen deposits. He consequently proposed that the conspicuous scarcity of grass pollen in pollen deposits dating from the pre-Neolithic Holocene might not necessarily speak against the existence of open environments dominated by grasses. However, it is generally considered that over 60% tree pollen in pollen deposits indicates a closed forest canopy, which is true for the vast majority of European early to mid-Holocene deposits. Sites with less than 50% arboreal pollen, on the other hand, are consistently associated with human activities.

==== Circular reasoning ====
Vera stressed that the prevailing high-forest theory was born out of observations of spontaneous regeneration in the absence of grazing animals. He argued that the presupposition that these animals do not exert a significant influence on natural regeneration, and thus on the vegetation structure as a whole, has been made without comparative confirmation, and is therefore a circular argument. Indeed, modern forestry and forest theory arose largely in the modern era and went hand in hand with the ongoing inclosure of common land throughout Europe. A consequence thereof was in many cases a ban of livestock from the forests, which had previously largely been open woodland pastures, often dominated by oaks. These were multifunctional and used for a range of purposes, from pannage and livestock grazing to the harvest of tree hay, coppice, timber and oak galls for the manufacture of ink, as well as for the production of charcoal, crops and fruit. This former usage of forests is often still revealed by a big age gap between tree generations, particularly if the oldest trees are mainly oaks, and many Central European forest reserves originated as common wood-pastures.

==== Shifted baselines ====
In nature conservation, a shifted baseline is a baseline for conservation targets and desired population sizes that is based on non-pristine conditions. In this sense, the term was coined by marine biologist Daniel Pauly when he observed that some fisheries scientists used the population sizes of fish at the beginning of their own careers to assess a desired baseline, notwithstanding whether the fishing stocks they used as baselines had already been diminished by human exploitation. He noticed, that the estimations these scientists took for reference markedly differed from historical accounts. Consequently, he concluded that over generations the perception of what is considered to be normal would change, and so may what is considered a depleted population. Pauly called this the shifting baseline syndrome.

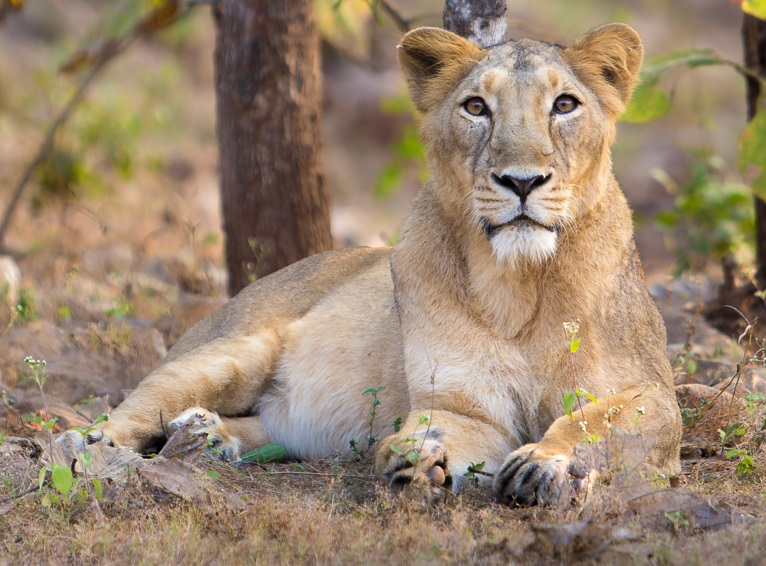
An example of a shifted baseline: Asiatic lions were present in the Balkans well into Classical Antiquity, yet few would consider them native to Europe. (Pictured: An Asiatic lioness in India's Gir National Park.)

In line with this, it may be argued that the prevalence of closed-canopy forest as the prevailing conservation narrative in Europe similarly arises from multiple shifted baselines:

- While it is plausible that lions (Panthera speleae, P. leo leo), leopards (Panthera pardus spelaea, P. pardus tulliana), (Note: A small population of leopards survives in the European Caucasus, but there are historical records of Anatolian leopards crossing the Mycale Strait to Greece in the late 1800s. Leopards may have historically persisted elsewhere in Europe, but this is only tentative. The most recent remains of probably wild specimens come from the Balkans and the Iberian Peninsula and date from the early Holocene. Later finds probably come from imported animals.) hyenas (Hyaena hyaena prisca, Crocuta crocuta spelaea), dholes (Cuon alpinus europeus), wild ass (Equus hydruntinus, E. hemionus kulan) (Note: Wild asses of the hydruntine type persisted well into the Holocene in Europe and the Middle East, although they became increasingly isolated in refugia in Italy, France, along the Danube to Ukraine and from Anatolia to the Transcaucasus. The hydruntine seems to have disappeared from Europe by the Bronze Age, but findings from Anatolia suggest a late survival in this region until at least the 1st millennium BC. The kulan, with which the hydruntine apparently coexisted at various times, probably did not disappear from the European Pontic-Caspian Steppe until the 18th and 19th centuries.) and moon bears (Ursus thibetanus mediterraneus, U. t. permjak), among other victims of European Quaternary and Holocene extinctions, would still be native to Europe, had they not been evicted by humans, none of these species are listed as such in the EU's Habitats Directive's annexes. Likewise, globally extinct megafauna such as straight-tusked elephants and rhinos would likely be native to Europe without human interference, and they would in all probability have a strong positive impact on biodiversity and ecosystem functions. It is therefore very likely that the megafauna extinctions of the late Pleistocene and early Holocene had profound implications for European and worldwide ecosystems, especially given the paramount importance comparable animals have for modern ecosystems.
- Vera pointed out that words like wold and forest used to have different connotations than they do today. While today, a forest is a dense and reasonably large tract of trees, the medieval Latin forestis, from which it derives, assigned open stands of trees, and was a wild and uncultivated land home also to aurochs and wild horses. According to historical sources, these forestis included hawthorn, blackthorn, wild cherry, wild apple and wild pear, as well as oaks, all of which are light-demanding species that cannot regenerate successfully in closed-canopy forest. From this Vera concluded that original wildwoods still existed in Europe during the Medieval period. Thus, when scholars of the 19th and 20th century assumed that grazing animals had destroyed the original European closed-canopy wildwoods, they were misinterpreting these terms. Instead, these forests, he found, had been destroyed following the industrial revolution and the population growth it caused, which in turn caused overexploitation.
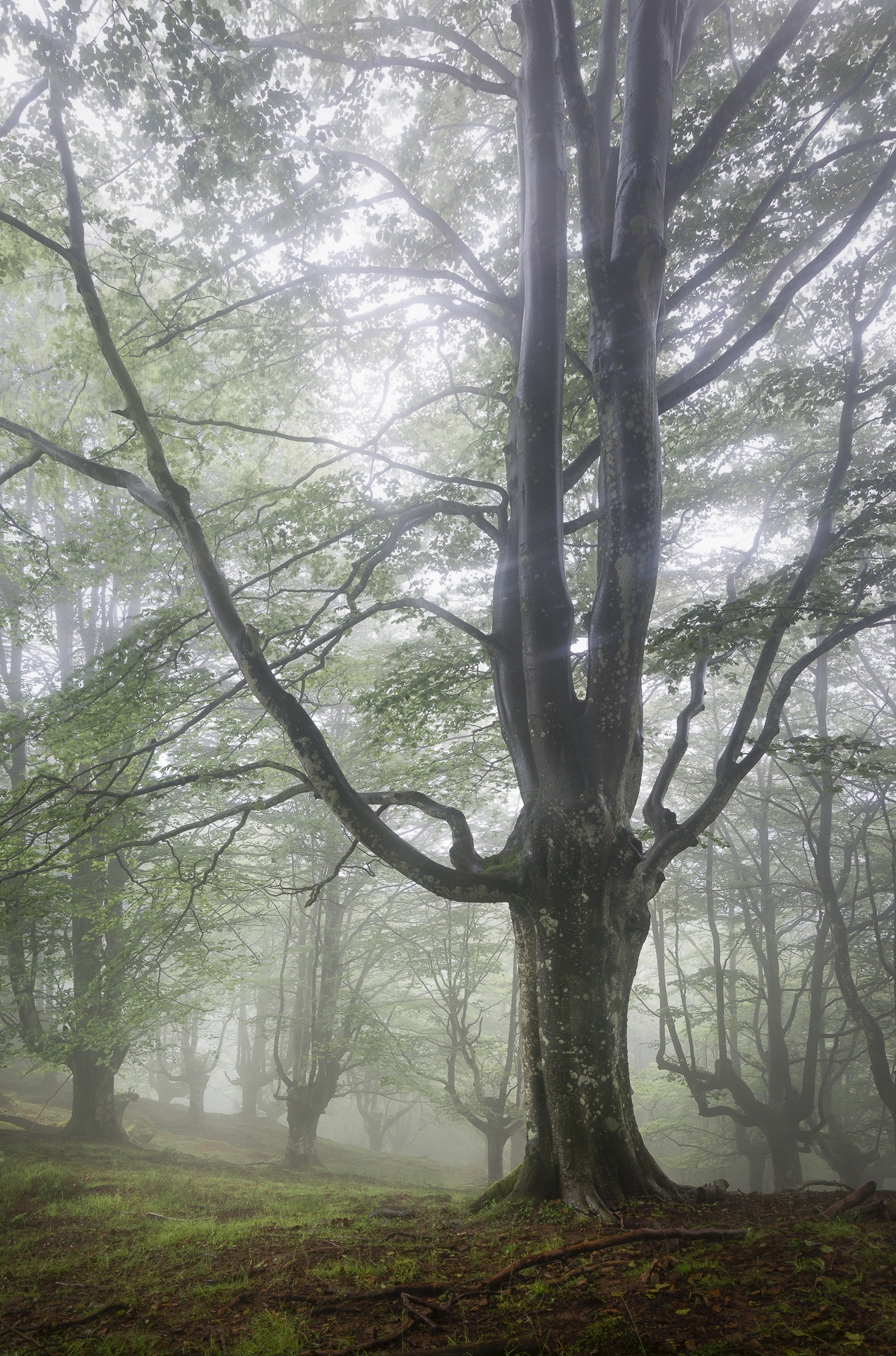
  Many European forests were formerly managed as wood-pasture, coppice or were, as in this case, pollarded.
- He further argued that from this initial misinterpretation gave rise to another misinterpretation: that forest regeneration would naturally take place inside the forest. Thus, scholars of the 19th and 20th century such as Elias Landolt (forester) interpreted medieval grazing regulations to allow tree regeneration in coppiced mantle and fringe vegetation as intended to allow regeneration in a forest. In their time, solid firewood was preferred to the medieval coppice bundles, e.g. faggots. However, the production of solid firewood required the felling of trees at an age when they could no longer produce suckers, an ability that trees commonly lose with progressing age. This then led to a different management system: the replacement by saplings planted or naturally regenerated via, for example, shelterwood cuttings. Initially, these trees regenerated inside the forests were differentiated from wild growth outside the forests. In German, the former were referred to as natural regeneration (Naturverjüngung) while the latter had a different name: Holzwildwuchse. Thus, natural regeneration was not synonymous with the natural regeneration of trees in a natural situation. It was not until the 19th and 20th centuries that this distinction was abandoned in German. However, in the absence of thorny nurse bushes, which disappeared due to the shadow under the trees, the planted trees then had to be protected manually. The "natural regeneration" was therefore still depended on work like ploughing, removal of browsing pressure and the suppression of weeds, making it not "natural" in the conventional sense. Instead, according to Vera, the original meaning of the word "natural" in this context was that a seed fell from a tree and then grew by itself, as opposed to being planted. This shift in expectation of where regeneration of trees was to be expected, from thorny fringes of groves in wood-pastures to the interior of closed tree stands, then led to the notion that herbivores were detrimental to forest regeneration, and necessitated fenced-out areas, tree shelters and population control via hunting.
- Considered "alien" to the landscape, akin to invasive species, cattle and horses were now also removed from the forests, as it happened in former wood-pastures like Białowieża, because they were seen as harmful to the creation of a new old-growth forest. At the same time, the introduction of the potato made pannage, the fattening of pigs on acorns, obsolete, and grass species specifically bred for a high yield superseded the traditional pasturing, mostly of cattle, in wood-pastures. Together, these mechanisms created the spatial separation between livestock rearing and forestry, grassland and forest enshrined into modern law and practice.
- Finally, the biodiversity losses associated with the conversion of open grassland, mantle and fringe vegetation and open-grown trees into closed-canopy forests were legitimised by the assumption that the forest was the only natural ecosystem, and hence species losses were casualties of a natural cause.

However, a strong argument that may put Vera's etymological evidence into perspective altogether is that the composition of medieval woodlands may not be relevant to their naturalness. Since by the medieval period agricultural traditions had already been ubiquitous in most of Europe for millennia, it may be unrealistic to assume that what people of the time perceived and labelled as wilderness may indeed have been one. Instead, it is doubtful that pristine conditions had survived in the Central- and Western European lowlands, Vera's area of study, at any rate up to this point.

=== Succession in grazed ecosystems ===
There are several ecological processes at work in herbivore grazing systems, namely associational resistance, shifting mosaics, cyclic succession, and gap dynamics. These processes would collectively transform the surrounding landscape, as per Vera's model.

==== Associational resistance ====
The term associational resistance describes facilitating relationships between plants that grow close to each other, against both biotic and abiotic stresses like browsing, drought, or salinity. In relation to grazed ecosystems, it can allow for the recruitment of trees and other palatable woody species, via thorny nurse bushes, in these environments. It has been proposed and demonstrated that associational resistance can be a key process in grazed environments, ensuring natural succession.

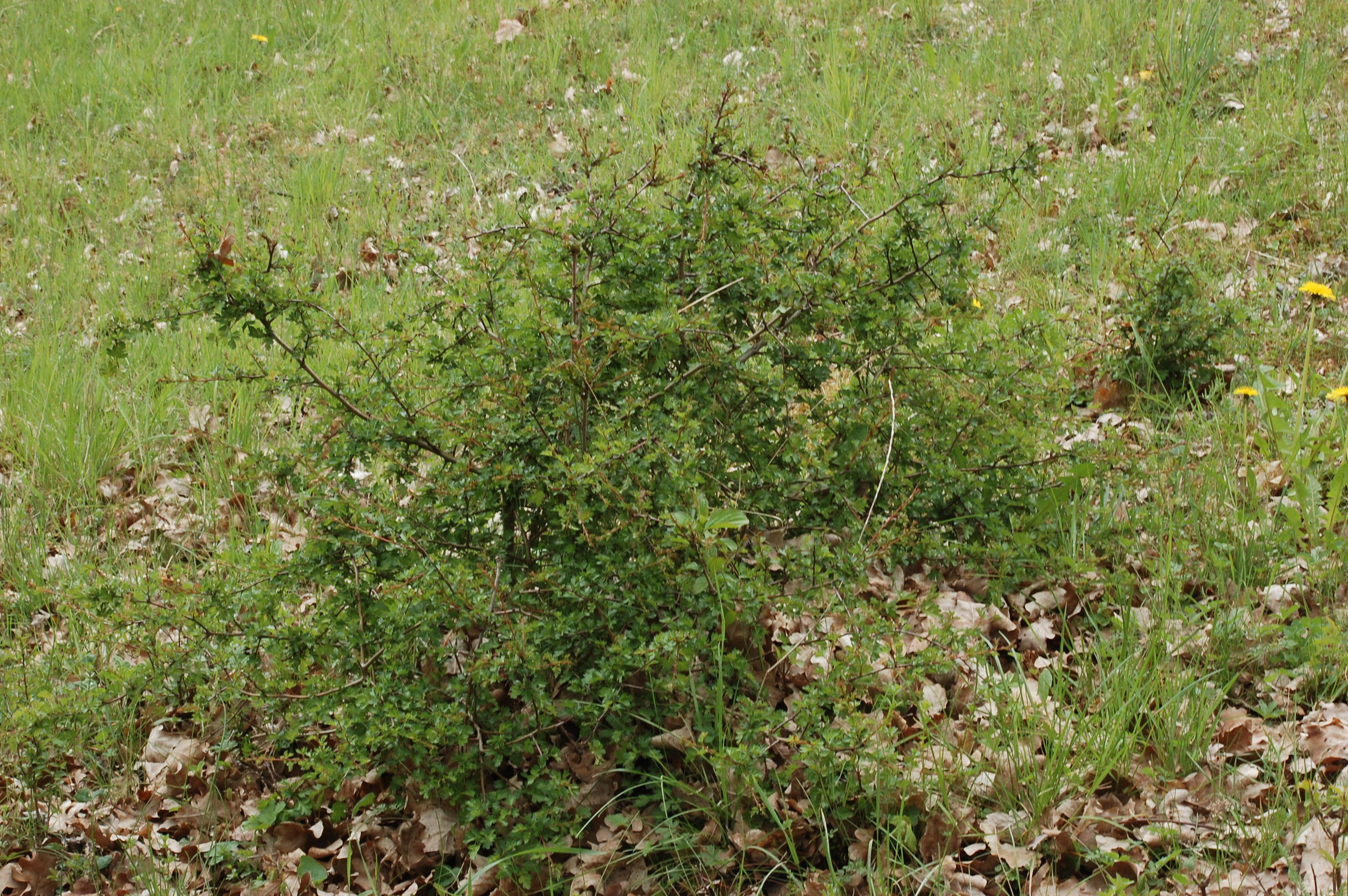
Young hawthorn shrub, heavily browsed upon by cattle and therefore shaped. A young dogwood bush inside benefits from the hawthorn's thorn protection.

In temperate Europe, succession on pastures commonly starts with so called "islets" ("Geilstellen"), patches of dung which are avoided by the herbivores for an amount of time after deposition, sufficient to allow the establishment of relatively unpalatable species such as rushes, nettles and hummocks of tall grasses like tussock grass. These swards, in turn, provide protection for thorny shrubs such as blackthorn, roses, hawthorn, juniper, bramble, holly and barberry during their early years, when they do not yet have protective thorns and are therefore vulnerable. Once the thorny saplings are fully established, they grow bigger over time and subsequently allow other, less resilient species to establish in their thorn protection, forming mantle and fringe vegetation together with species such as guelder rose, wild privet and dogwood. Other species such as mazzard, checker tree, rowan and whitebeam, which are distributed by fruit-eating birds through their faeces, would also frequently be placed within these shrubs, through resting birds leaving their droppings.

On the other hand, nut-bearing species such as hazel, beech, chestnut, pedunculate and sessile oak would become "planted" somewhat deliberately in the vicinity of those shrubs by rodents such as red squirrel and wood mouse, the nuthatch and corvids such as crows, magpies, ravens and especially jays, which store them for winter supply. In Europe, the Eurasian jay represents the most important seed disperser of oak, burying acorns individually or in small groups. Eurasian jays not only bury acorns in depths favoured by oak saplings, but seemingly also prefer spots with sufficient light availability, i.e. open grassland and transitions between grassland and shrubland, seeking for vertical structures such as shrubs in the near surroundings. Since oak is relatively light-demanding while not having the ability to regenerate on its own under high browsing pressure, these habits of the jay presumably benefit oak, since they provide the conditions oak requires for optimal growth and health. On a similar note, the nuthatch seems to assume a prominent role for hazel dispersal.

In addition, species such as wild pear, crab apple and whitty pear, which bear relatively large fruit, would find propagators in herbivores such as roe deer, red deer and cattle, or in omnivores such as the wild boar, red fox, the European badger and the raccoon, while wind-dispersed species such as maple, elm, lime or ash would land within these shrubs by chance.

Thorny bushes play an important role in tree regeneration in the European lowlands, and evidence is emerging that similar processes can also ensure the survival of browsing-sensitive species like rowan in browsed boreal forests.

==== Shifting mosaics and cyclic succession ====
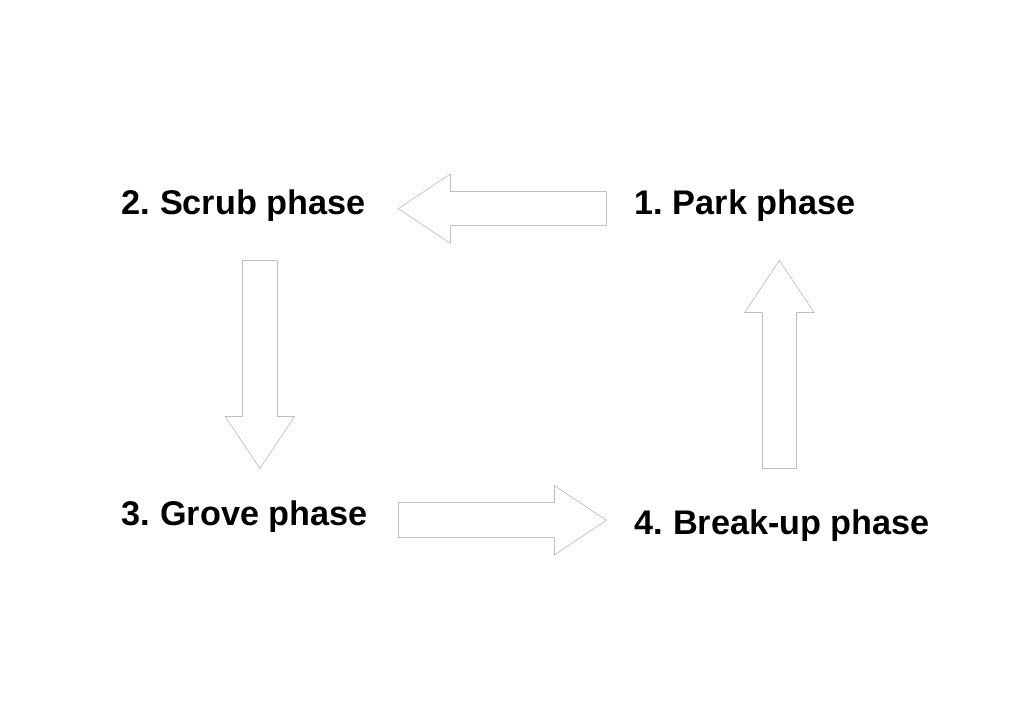
The four phases of vegetation succession according to the hypothesis: In the park phase, grassland and heath prevail. In the scrub phase they get invaded by thorny shrubs, which in turn provide protection for tree saplings. Then, in the grove phase, the saplings grow up and displace the nurse bushes. Eventually, in the break-up phase, the trees start to die, the groves thin out and grassland species return.

A natural pasture ecosystem would therefore undergo various stages of succession, starting with unpalatable perennial plants, which provide shelter for thorny woody plants. Second, these would start to form thickets and enable the establishment of larger, palatable shrubs and trees respectively. Over time these would then outshadow the unpalatable but light-demanding thickets and emerge as big solitary trees, in the case of single-standing shrubs like hawthorn, or groups of trees in the case of expanding blackthorn shrubs. Because of the herbivore disturbance (browsing, trampling, wallowing, dust bathing), not even shade-tolerant tree saplings would be able to grow under the established trees. Therefore, once the established trees would start to decay, either due to old age or other factors like pathogens, illness, lightning strike or windbreak, this would leave open, bare land behind, for grasses and unpalatable species to colonise, closing the cycle.

On a large scale, different successional stages would thus contribute an ecosystem where open grassland, scrubland, emerging tree growth, groves of trees and solitary trees exist next to each other, and the alternation between these various successional stages would create dynamic shifting mosaics of vegetation. This in turn stimulates high biodiversity. Consequently, Vera's counter-proposal to the linear succession and Watt's gap-phase model of closed-canopy forest, to which it has been compared is a model of successional cycles known as the shifting mosaics model.

In effect however, not all areas would have necessarily been subject to this permanent change. Since grazing animals generally prefer to spend time in grasslands rather than in closed stands of trees, it would practically be possible for three different landscape types to coexist over longer periods in the same spots: permanently open areas, permanently closed groves and areas subject to constant shifting mosaics.

== The prehistoric baseline ==
=== The Eemian landscape ===
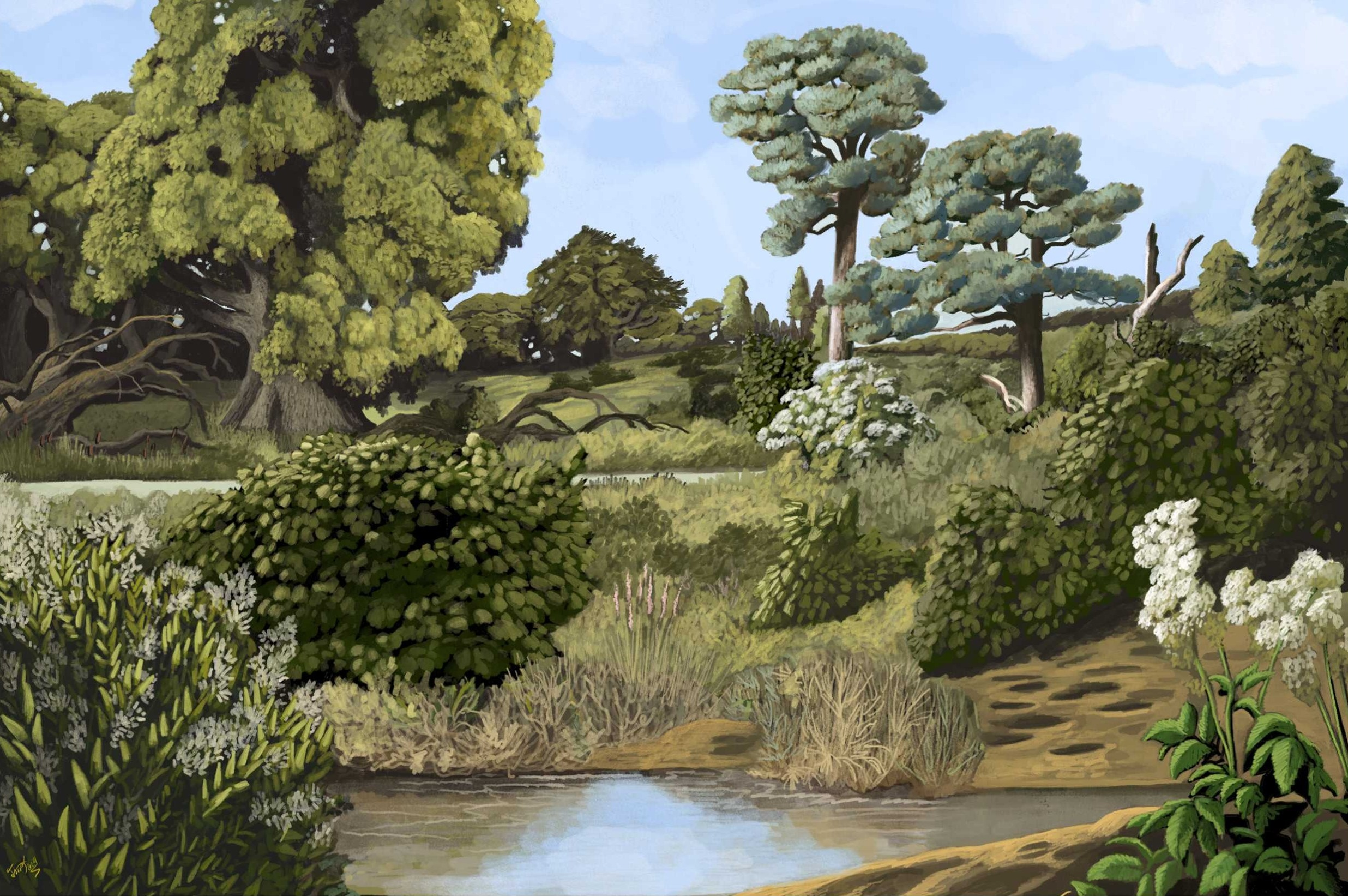
Eemian landscape in temperate Europe, featuring plant species that are well-represented in pollen deposits including privet (Ligustrum vulgare, lower left corner), pedunculate oak (Quercus robur, upper left corner), yew (Taxus baccata, background), elder (Sambucus nigra, centre), Scots pine (Pinus sylvestris, background), hazel (Corylus avellana, interspersed), and meadowsweet (Filipendula ulmaria, lower right corner).

Although Vera himself limited his argument to the Holocene and the fauna present into historical times, research better supports his claims in regard to earlier interglacials. Modern humans have likely exerted a strong influence in Europe since their first appearance here during the Weichselian glaciation, which has led some researchers to criticize Vera's choice of the early to mid Holocene as his benchmark for pristine nature. Instead, they argue that pristine nature only existed in Europe before the entering of Homo sapiens. They argue that the best model for what a truly natural landscape during a warm period in Europe would look like is the Eemian interglacial, which was the last warm period before the current Holocene, approximately 130,000 to 115,000 years ago, and the last warm period before Homo sapiens. (Note: There is evidence for a limited and – for the time being – unsuccessful human dispersal into Europe more than 200 kya, but neanderthals were still dominant.) While archaic humans existed in the form of neanderthals, their influence was probably only localised, due to their low population density. During this warm period, paleoecological data indeed suggest that semi-open landscapes, as postulated by Vera, were widespread and common, most likely maintained by large herbivores. Next to these semi-open landscapes, however, the researchers also found evidence for closed-canopy forest. Overall, the Eemian landscape appears to have been very dynamic and probably consisted of varying degrees of openness, including open grasslands, wood pastures, light-open woodland and closed-canopy forest, with high local heterogeneity.

=== The European megafauna ===
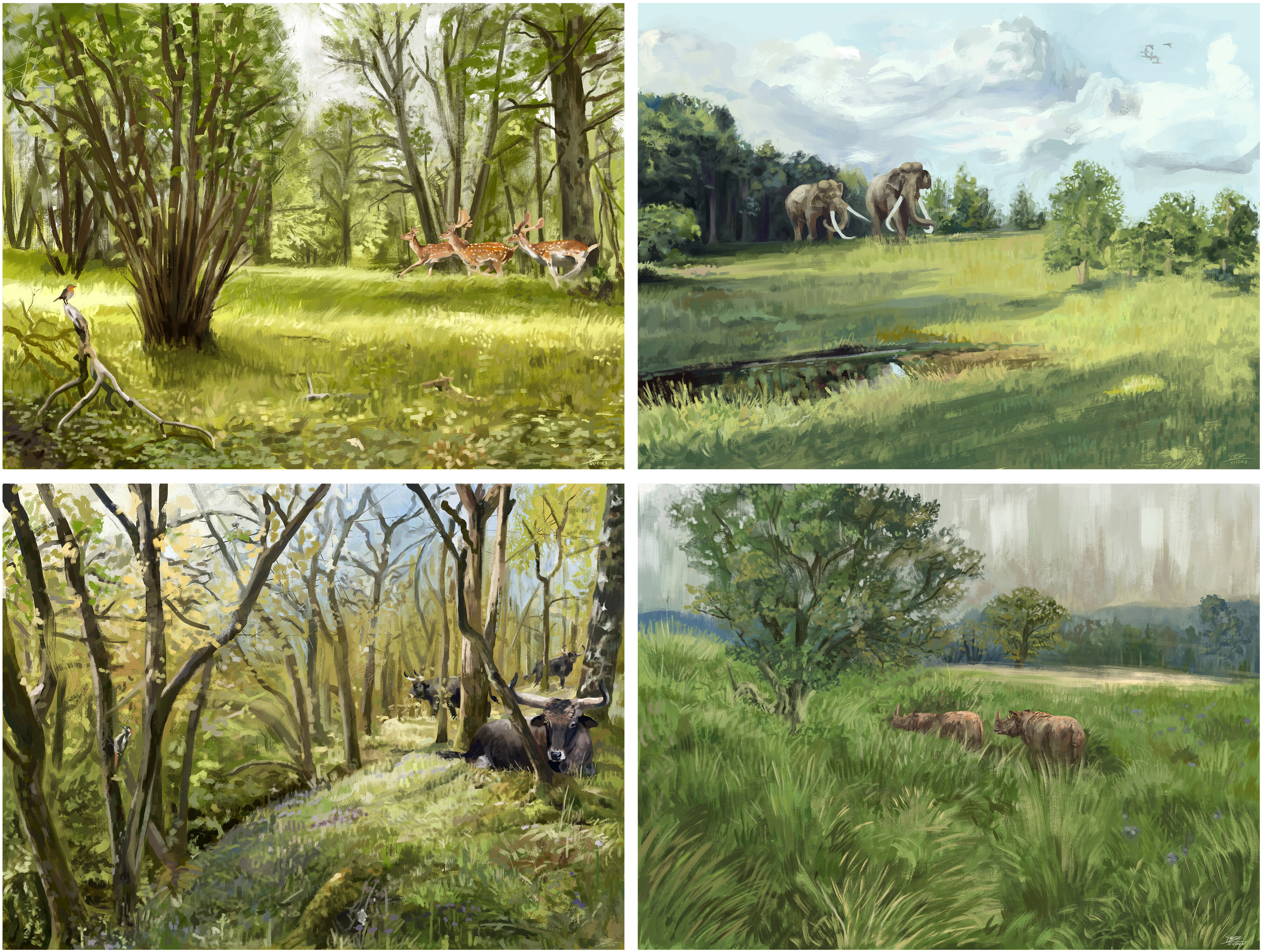
Collage of mixed temperate forest environments in Europe during the Eemian. Animals clockwise: fallow deer, straight-tusked elephants, Merck's rhinoceros and aurochs.

The Eemian interglacial was one of many warm interglacials during the Quaternary, of which the Holocene (or Flandrian interglacial) is the most recent. These alternating glacial and interglacial periods, triggered by the Milankovitch cycles, in turn had a profound influence on life. In Middle to Late Pleistocene Europe, the result of this cycling was that two very different faunal and floral assemblages took turns in Central Europe. The warm-temperate Palaeoloxodon-faunal assemblage, consisting of the straight-tusked elephant, Merck's rhinoceros, the narrow-nosed rhinoceros, Hippopotamuses, European water buffalo, aurochs, and several species of deer, among others (including most of today's European fauna), had its core area in the Mediterranean. The warm-temperate assemblage periodically expanded from there into the rest of Europe during warm interglacials, and receded during glacial periods into refugia in the Mediterranean. Meanwhile, the cold-temperate faunal assemblage of the mammoth steppe, consisting of the woolly mammoth, woolly rhinoceros, reindeer, saiga, muskox, steppe bison, arctic fox and lemming among others, was spread across vast areas of Northern Eurasia as well as North America, and during periodic cold glacials advanced deep into Europe. Other animals, such as horses, steppe lions, the scimitar cat, the Ice Age spotted hyena and wolves were part of both faunal assemblages. Both groups of animals spread and retreated cyclically, depending on whether the climate favoured one or the other, but essentially remained intact in refugia that continued to provide the conditions they preferred.

=== The Quaternary extinction event ===
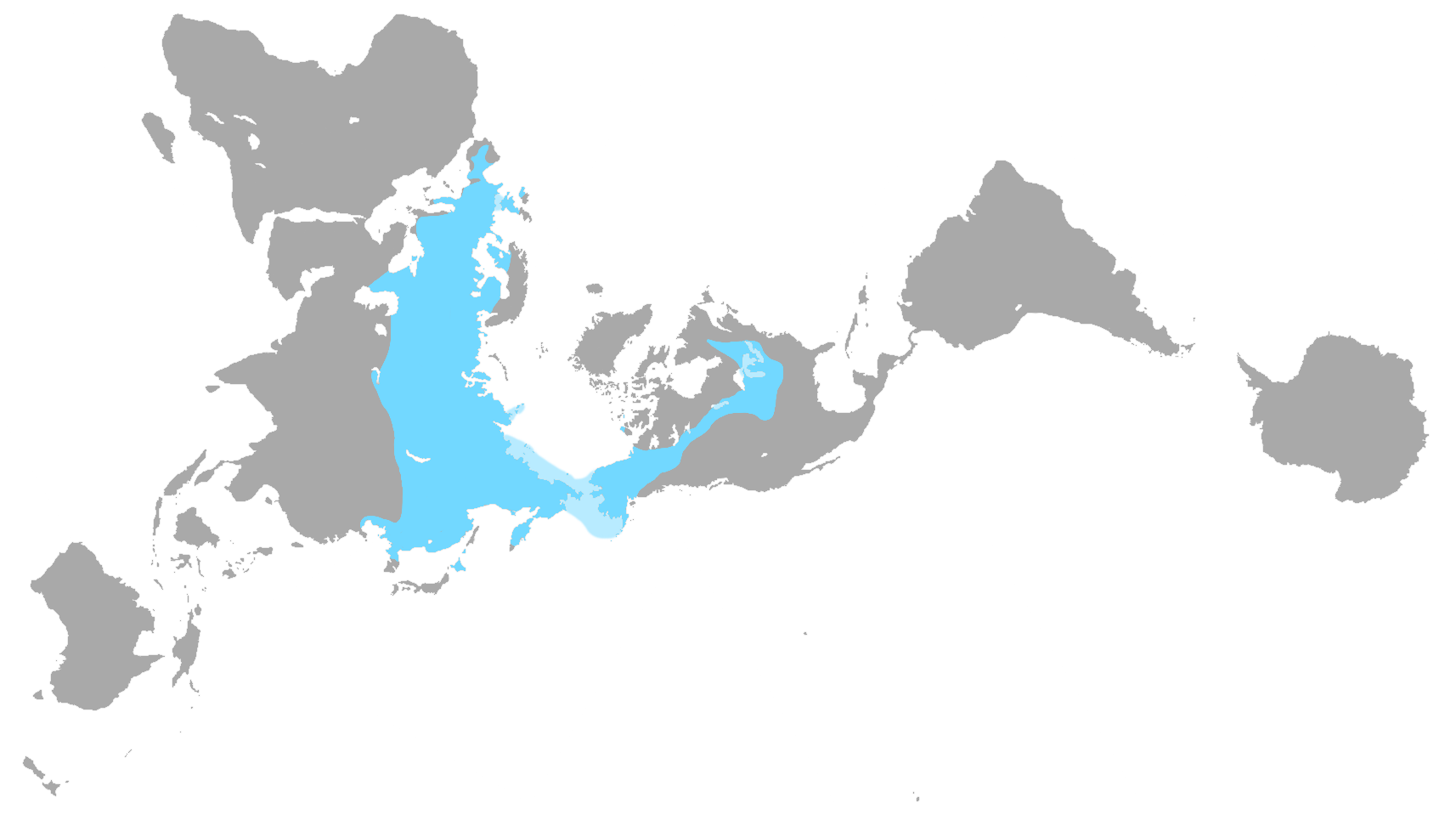
Late Pleistocene distribution of the woolly mammoth, marking the extension of the mammoth steppe.

Prior to the Last Glacial Maximum however, elements of the warm-temperate Palaeoloxodon-fauna (hippopotamus, straight-tusked elephant, the two Stephanorhinus species and neanderthals, for example) as well as the steppe species Elasmotherium sibricum started to disappear and eventually went extinct. At the onset of the Last Glacial Maximum, populations of Ice Age spotted hyena and the cave bear complex (Ursus spelaea, Ursus ingressus) seem to have collapsed large-scale, and became extinct next. After the Last Glacial Maximum and towards the Holocene, extinctions continued, with many emblematic "Ice Age species" of the mammoth steppe and adjacent habitats, such as the woolly rhinoceros, the steppe lion, the giant deer and the woolly mammoth falling victim, although small regional populations of woolly mammoth and steppe bison held out well into the Holocene, and the giant deer was present in the southern Ural region into historical times. These extinctions have been variously credited to human impact, climate change, or a combination of the two.

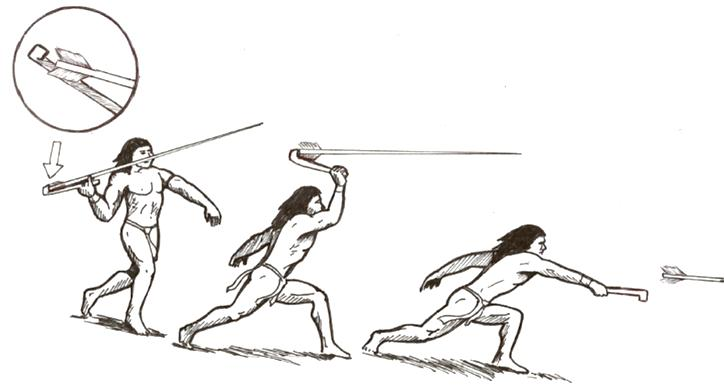
Atlatls have been used in Europe since at least the late Upper Palaeolithic and were effective weapons for killing large, thick-skinned prey.

These extinctions were not limited to Europe or the Palearctic, but rather occurred on all continents except for Antarctica, in temporal connection to the migration of Homo sapiens. Together, these extinctions are commonly known as the Quaternary extinction event. Whereas today megafaunal Proboscideans, Rhinocerotidae and Hippopotamidae that commonly attain weights of 1,000 kilograms (2,200 lb) exclusively exist in the global south, notably Sub-Saharan Africa and South and Southeast Asia, land mammals of comparable or greater size used to roam the northern hemisphere and South America until relatively recently. (Note: Bovines are now the only animals outside Africa and Asia that may attain comparable sizes.) By 10,000 BC, the megafauna of the global north had alternately died out or been severely geographically restricted. Notable examples include various Proboscideans, Rhinocerotidae, ground sloths as well as all South American ungulates, glyptodontines and diprotodontids.

In addition, many mammals above 45 kilograms (99 lb) that were spread across all continents except for Antarctica prior to the Quaternary extinction event have since declined across their range, or become locally or globally extinct, respectively. Modern taxa with a once wider distribution include the Eurasian saiga, wapiti-deer, the Asian black bear, bisons, the dhole, lions, the leopard, the jaguar, and the giant anteater. Research has also shown that the extant megafaunal species that survived the extinction event experienced a sharp population decline starting at the same time and continuing to the present day. While the exact cause of these events remains debated, it seems clear that ecological niches in Europe, the Middle East, big parts of Asia, and the Americas were left unoccupied.

=== The impact of megafauna extinctions ===
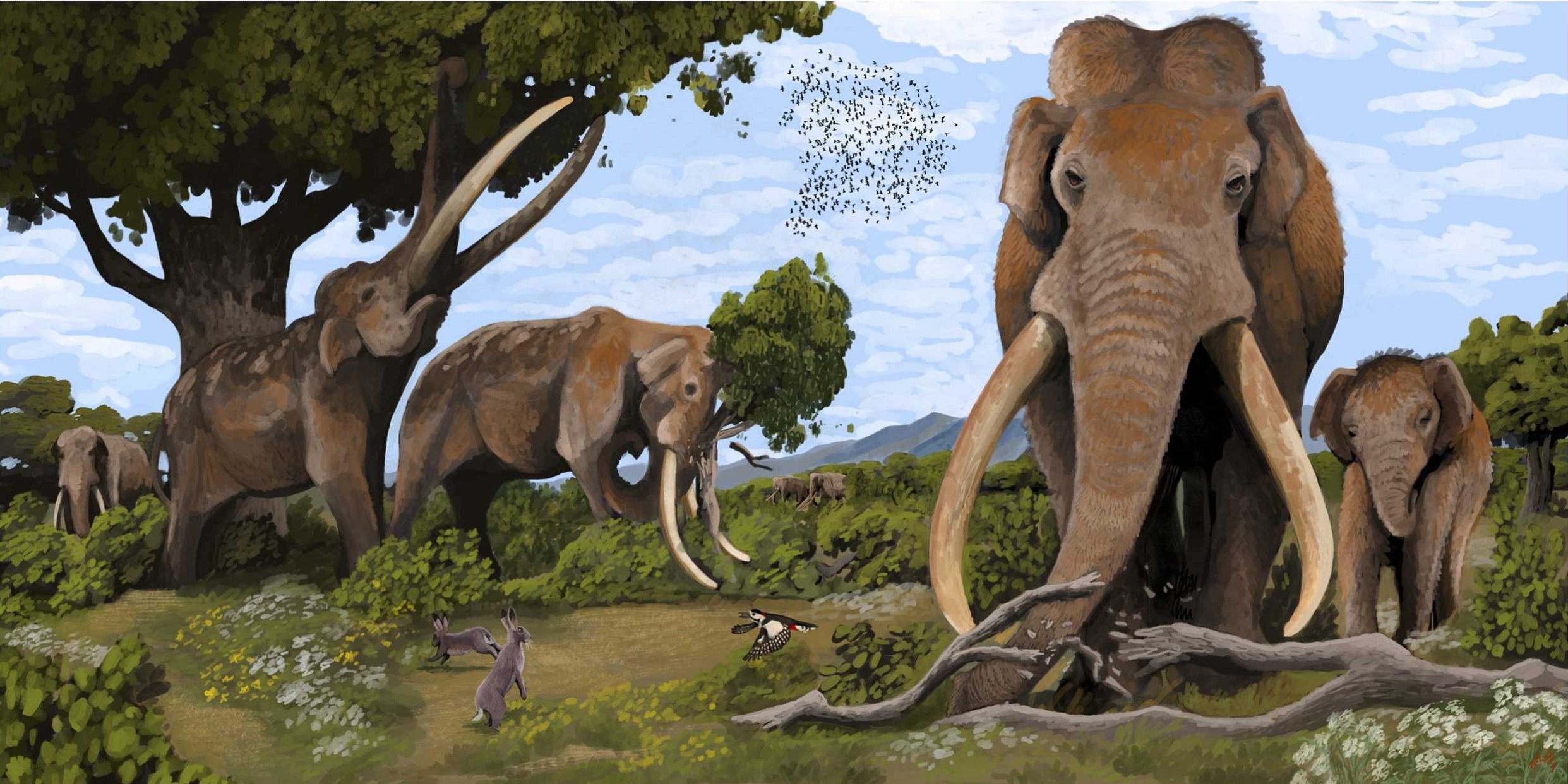
Akin to extant elephants, megafauna such as the straight-tusked elephant likely had a strong influence on vegetation structure during the Eemian of temperate Europe. Pictured are also a swarm of starlings (Sturnus vulgaris), European hare (Lepus europaeus) and great spotted woodpecker (Dendrocopos major).

The effects of the global extinction of megafauna are likely to have been far-reaching and damaging to ecosystems, and continue to be. The late Quaternary extinction event is unprecedented in the Cenozoic (i.e. since the extinction of the non-avian dinosaurs) in its selectivity for large animals. Accordingly, the modern European megafauna-extirpated ecosystems deviate strongly from the megafauna-rich evolutionary norm. Similar to how herds of herbivores like wildebeest, zebra, impala, buffalo, and elephants drive African savanna vegetation patterns, and not vice versa (i.e. the vegetation dictates the activities of these herbivores), it now seems likely that herbivore herds could have provided similar ecosystem functions in the temperate regions before the Quaternary extinctions.

In Europe, where many species such as the straight-tusked elephant, two species of Stephanorhinus and the hippopotamus among many others were lost, this meant that their ecosystem functions – such as plant matter consumption and seed dispersal – were lost as well. Without the disturbance these animals provide, it is argued, forests could develop unhindered and landscapes became more uniform. As this is detrimental to species adapted to the presence of megafauna, some scholars advocate for the reintroduction of these animals where possible, or the introduction of modern proxy species to replace extinct species and their ecological impact, an advocacy known as Pleistocene rewilding.

== Towards a resolution ==
Vera's ideas have been called a "challenge to orthodox thinking" and his book has been widely acclaimed by colleagues. It is credited as the spark of much debate about the character of historic and prehistoric landscapes in Europe. However, testing using pollen data generally does not support Vera's claims for widespread semi-open savanna during early stages of the Holocene, but rather lends support to the competing and more widely accepted high-forest theory. Similarly, modelling approaches and the use of beetle diversity as an indicator for landscape openness also support the view of a predominance of forest throughout the early and middle Holocene in most of Europe. Consequently, the botanist John Birks has argued for the rejection of the wood-pasture hypothesis. He did, however, acknowledge that the role grazing animals played in forest composition is being reevaluated, and was formerly largely ignored by Quaternary paleoecologists.

On the other hand, consensus is building that while forest did most likely dominate throughout the early stages of the Holocene, it was never as dense and overarching as previously assumed. Studies also indicate that forest cover varied considerably between regions, and was comparably high in Central Europe and lower in the Atlantic regions. Besides climate, topography must have also played a significant role. The aurochs at least seems to have favoured fertile, low-lying riverine areas and plains, which may have led to locally open conditions, while the hill and mountain ranges were more heavily forested. Overall, dense closed-canopy forest probably covered no more than 60% of most areas, with the remainder divided between open woodlands, savannas and open areas. This made the early to mid-Holocene Europe more forested than either today or during earlier interglacials, but not a continuous woodland.

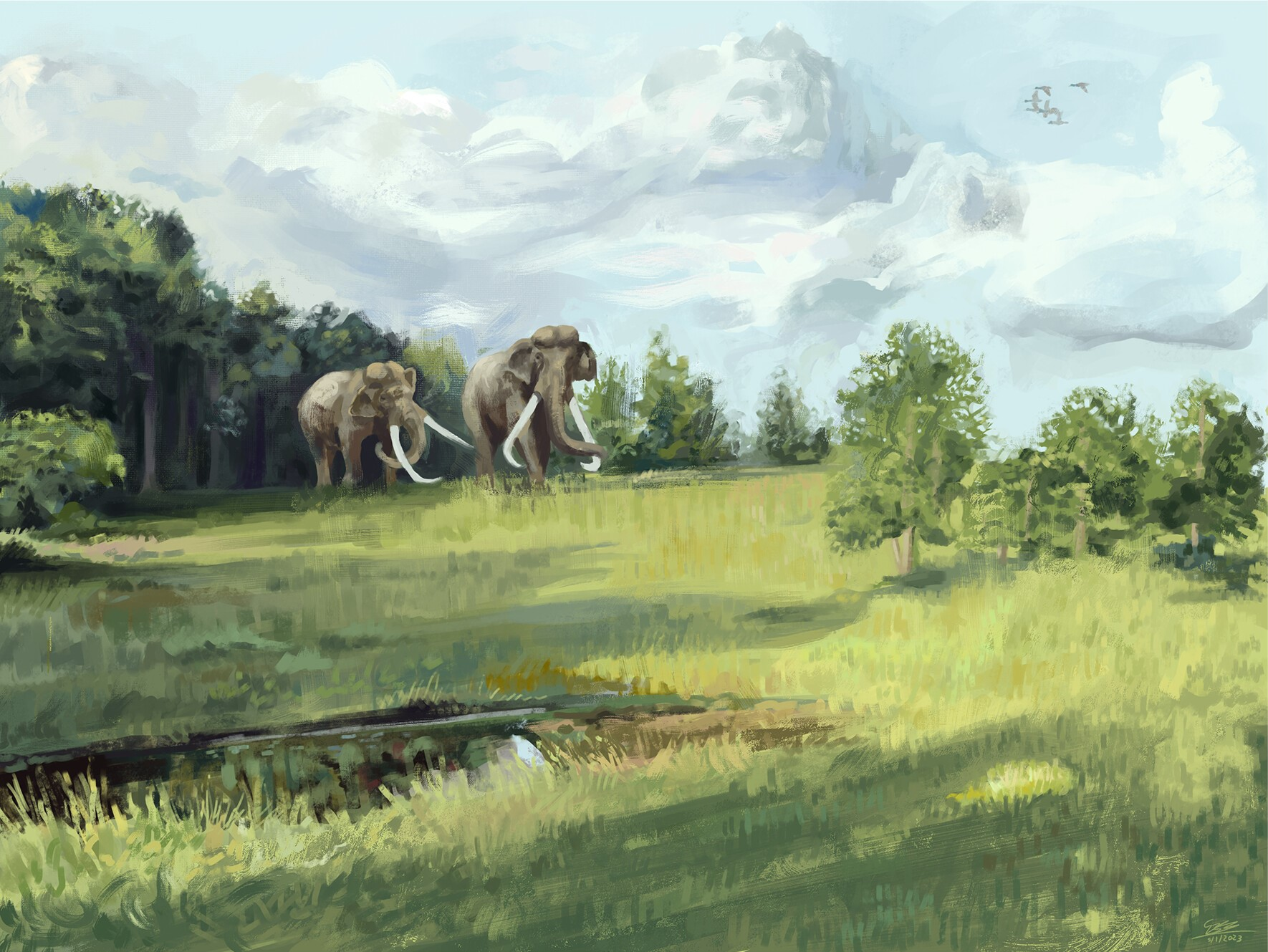
Life restoration of two straight-tusked elephants during the Eemian interglacial. Palaeoecological data suggest that the European megafauna may prehistorically have created a mosaic landscape in the temperate zone.

In a 2005 response to Vera, Kathy Hodder et al. highlighted the importance of disturbance factors other than herbivory, particularly fire, to prehistoric landscapes, pointing out that both the high-forest theory and Vera's model have largely ignored this possibility. This stands in connection to the discovery of fire-loving beetle species and charcoal deposits in the European pre-Neolithic Holocene. In the same paper, they also argued that the influence of large herbivores can be acknowledged without this necessarily implying that they created the open, park-like landscapes described by Vera.

At the same time, research has shown that under the current climate free-roaming large grazers can indeed influence and even temporarily halt vegetation succession, as proposed by Vera. Vera's choice of the Mesolithic as his benchmark for pristine nature has also been criticized, because the role people played during this period is unclear. Anatomically modern humans have been present in Europe since 50-40 kya, and studies indicate that already in the early Holocene, human impact on the environment was second in importance only to climate, surpassing herbivore disturbance. However, the late-Pleistocene expansion of modern humans out of Africa is frequently cited as cause for the simultaneous global extinction of primarily large mammals. In a 2014 paper, rewilding ecologist Christopher Sandom et al. found that the depauperate megafauna that remained in Europe after these extinctions may be the reason for the reduced landscape openness. They reached this conclusion by comparing beetle deposits from the Holocene and Eemian of Britain as indicators for the degree of openness. These beetles, they found, indicated that during the Eemian interglacial, the last interglacial with a pristine megafauna, landscape openness was associated with high megafauna densities. In contrast, closed forest predominated in the early Holocene in the absence of megafauna. The importance of the impact of large herbivores on vegetation and the significance of megafauna extinctions in this regard has also been highlighted in other studies.

== Implications and tangents ==
=== Implications for conservation practice ===
Vera's hypothesis has important implications for conservation theory and practice, because it puts emphasis on the importance of grasslands in temperate Europe and their legitimacy as natural landscapes with intrinsic conservation value. Under the high forest framework, these and related landscape types such as heathland were viewed as purely or mostly anthropogenic landscapes, naturally confined to areas marginal enough to prevent woodland formation. Instead it was believed that the broadleaved regions were dominated by climax communities of shade-tolerant species, interrupted only occasionally by collapses of forest cover and disturbances through fire, storm or browsing. Examples of this school of thought include Białowieża on the Polish-Belarusian border as well as the Hainich in Central Germany.

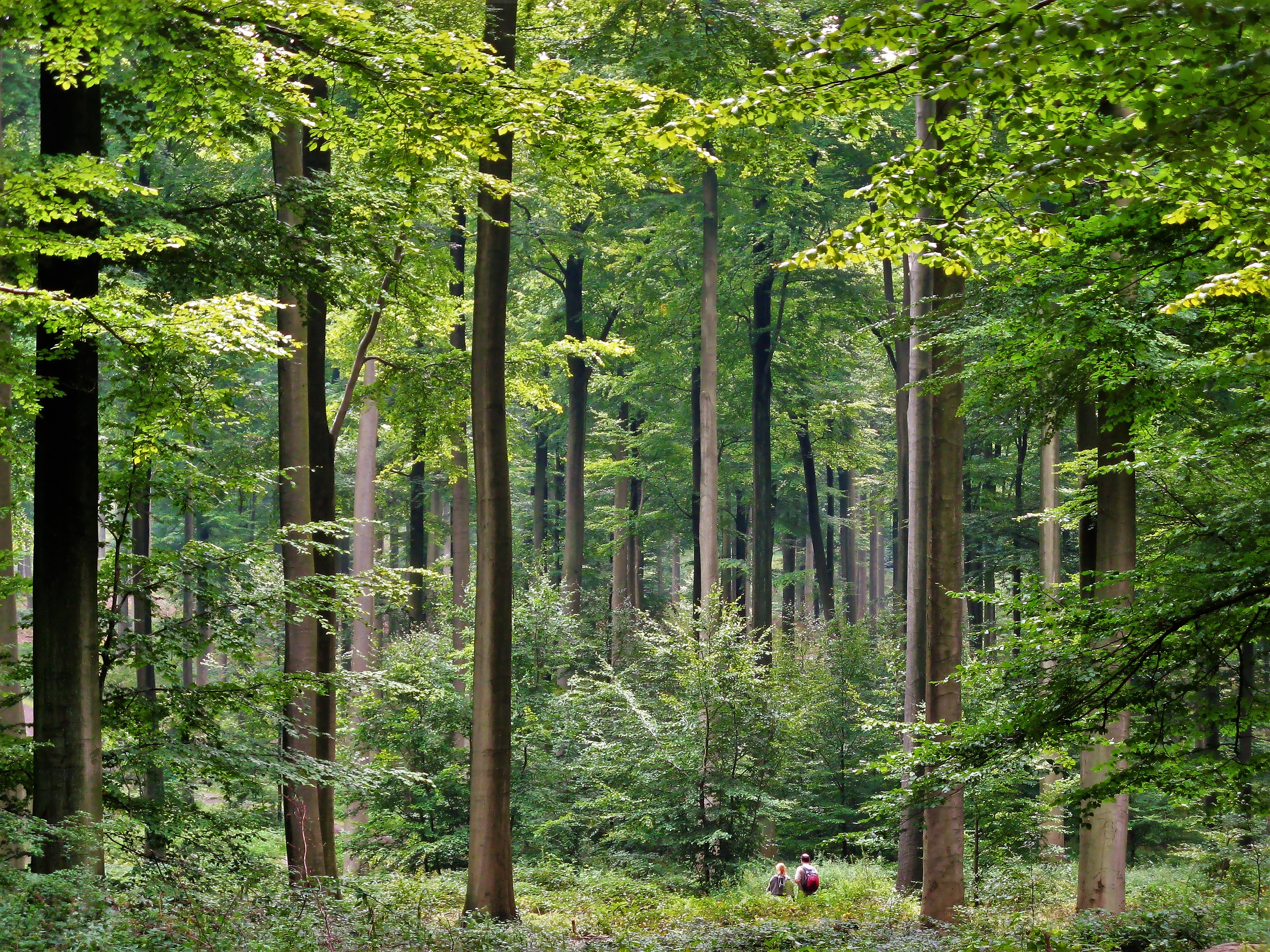
The Sonian Forest in Belgium as an example of a protected closed-canopy beech forest.

The logical consequence of this was that species associated with grasslands, forest fringes and old, open-grown trees disappeared on large scale, since many ecosystems in Europe, including highly species-rich grasslands in Romania, strictly depend on some management and are negatively impacted if the areas are left fallow and overgrown by forest vegetation. Similarly, the displacement of aspen in boreal forests seems to be accelerated more because of increasing competition in the increasingly closed stands than via browsing.

In Europe, grasslands were maintained by large herbivores over the last 1,8 million years, resulting in an exceptional diversity of species in many European grasslands. For example, on a wooded meadow in Estonia, 76 species of plant per 1 square metre (11 sq ft) were counted in 2000, making it one of the world's record sites. Similarly high numbers were counted at other locations in Eastern Europe, making the region one of the hotspots for plant species richness on small scale worldwide. However, grasslands in Europe and elsewhere are increasingly under threat, including from forest encroachment following abandonment, ill-conceived forest restoration schemes, overgrazing and agricultural intensification. Especially the notion that most grasslands derive from human management and as such are essentially degraded former woodlands suitable for reforestation has been called into question more recently and is threatening native grassland ecosystems worldwide. For Europe, studies have demonstrated the local persistence of grasslands throughout the Holocene as natural ecosystems, the important role they play for insects, for example, and the potential for biodiversity enhancement that lies in their maintenance by reintroduced large herbivores. At the same time, up to 90% of European semi-natural grasslands, meaning grasslands that were formerly maintained by humans and their livestock, have disappeared during the 20th century, with losses especially high in Western, Northern and Central Europe.

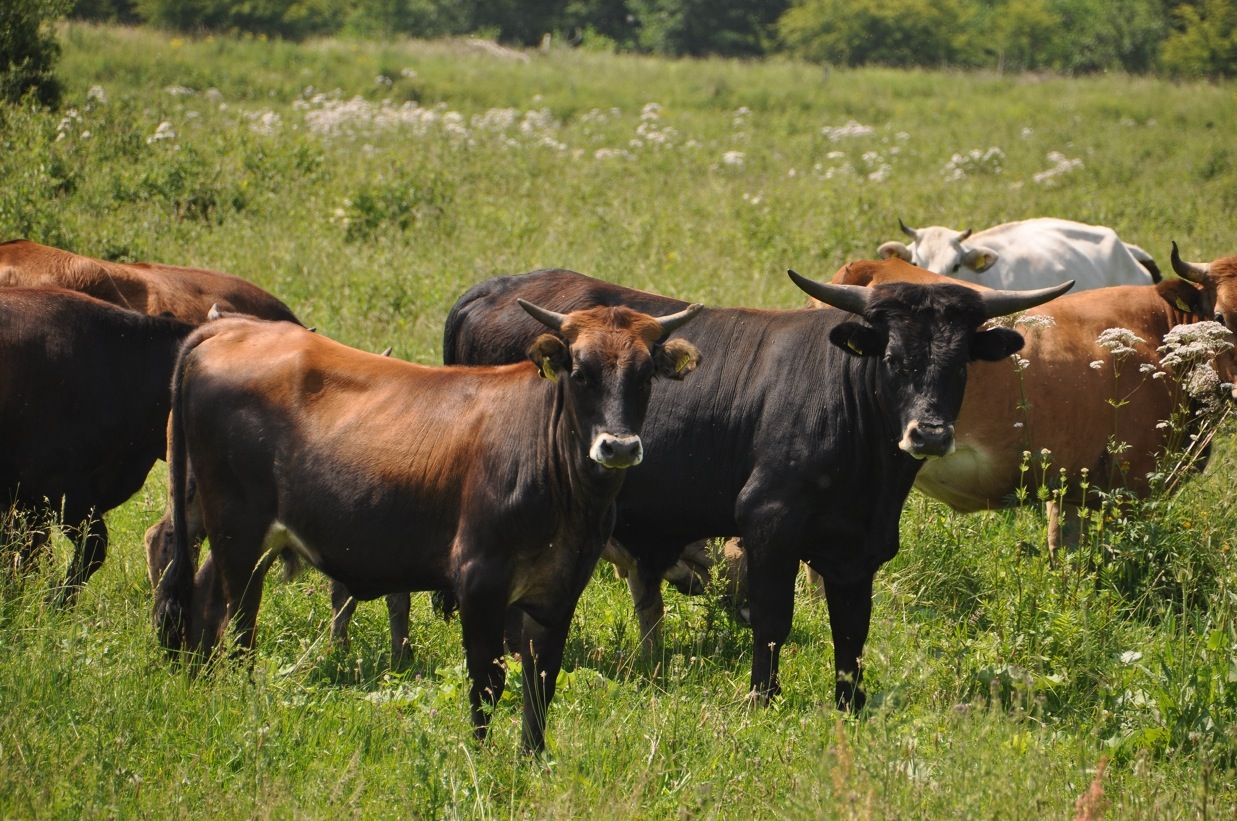
Taurus cattle in the Lippeaue, serving as proxies for the aurochs.

Given the significant importance oaks have as habitat for wood-eating insect communities in Europe, it has been pointed out that traditional forest management may not deliver all the benefits dead oak wood has for these species, since these often depend on surrounding circumstances such as sun-exposure. Instead, conservation of highly species-rich plant communities of open oak woodlands may best be achieved through traditional grazing management.

In the traditional framework of closed-canopy forest as the aspired ideal, the losses of species dependent on open areas were seen as collateral damage necessary for the creation of this ideal and had to be accepted because species associated with open areas were seen as hemerophiles anyway, which would have followed human clearings into Central and Western Europe only in the Holocene and would have originally been restricted to Southern and Eastern Europe. Taking into account that this results in overall biodiversity loss, traditional agricultural landscapes were then in turn recognised as important refuges for species-groups associated with open landscapes, seen as either a by-product of post-Neolithic agricultural traditions or relics of Pleistocene assemblages that formed alongside the now-extinct Pleistocene megafauna for which introduced domestic animals were partial substitutes. In both cases, their continued survival would largely depend on the continued execution of traditional agricultural practices.

Vera's hypothesis implies both that the model of primeval forest and the resulting rhetoric are the result of a major fallacy in nature conservation, paleoecology and forestry, and that the preservation of open and half-open landscapes and their germane biodiversity does not depend on agricultural practices, but rather on the maintenance by large herbivores, whether wild or domesticated.

==== Rewilding and practical implementation ====
The validity of Vera's hypothesis remains debated among ecologists and conservationists, but it is often considered a fruitful approach for conservation, and thus has been widely implemented in daily practice. The resulting rewilding-advocacy differs from more traditional conservation primarily in that it emphasises a hands-off approach. Instead of intervening to preserve or revive specific species or ecosystem types, the principle is to reduce human intervention to a minimum and instead reintroduce natural ecosystem dynamics, with emphasis being put on returning large mammals to the landscape.

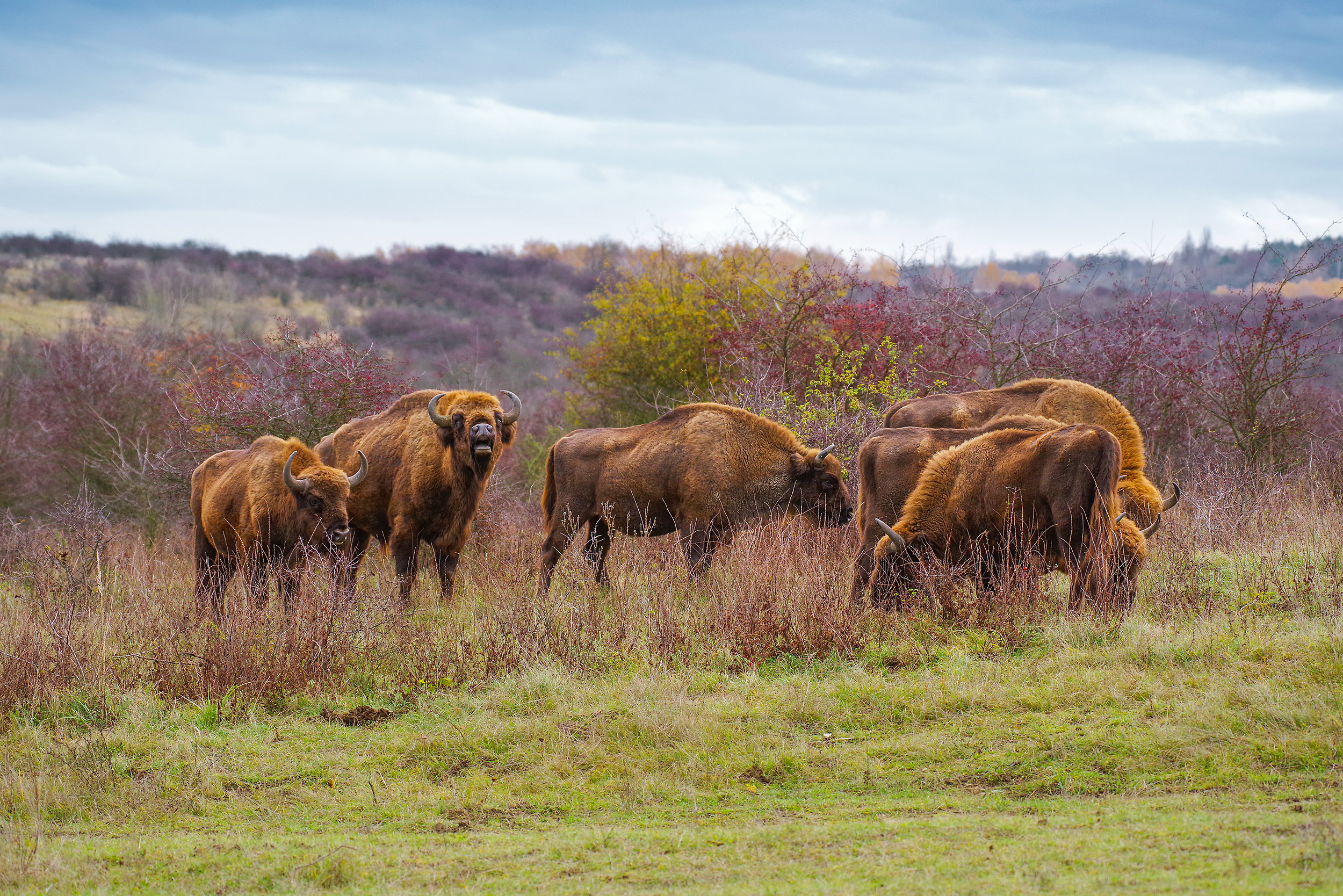
Wisent herd in Milovice Nature Reserve, Czech Republic.

Examples of such projects include the Dutch conservation area Oostvaardersplassen, which was initiated by Vera, as well as the Knepp estate in Sussex. Isabella Tree, co-owner of the latter, has named Vera and his ideas as important reasons for her and her husband to consider rewilding their private estate with fallow deer, red deer, English Longhorn cattle (as ecological proxies for the extinct aurochs) and Tamworth pigs (as proxies for the wild boar).

Furthermore, in the shape of Rewilding Europe, a pan-European organization that aims for creating wild spaces in Europe by re-establishing food chains and reintroducing missing species has identified Vera's proposals as key to complex, biodiverse ecosystems. Taking them into account, it works to establish free-moving herds of European bison, aurochs-proxies (e.g. Tauros-cattle), proxies for the wild tarpan (e.g. Konik, Exmoor pony) as well as water buffalo and kulan (which were present in Europe until the early Holocene) (Note: An early Holocene presence of bubaline bovids in southern Europe is indicated by bone finds, however, these are considered tentative due to the great similarity between remains of Bubalus and Bos (aurochsen). Another string of evidence for a potential postglacial survival of European water buffalo comes in the form of genetic evidence, demonstrating a genetic uniqueness of water buffalo breeds such as the Italian Mediterranean buffalo and the Romanian buffalo that might stem from autochthonous wild water buffalo ancestry.) to create dynamic ecosystems maintained by the grazing and browsing activity of these herbivores.

==== Ecology of wood-pastures ====
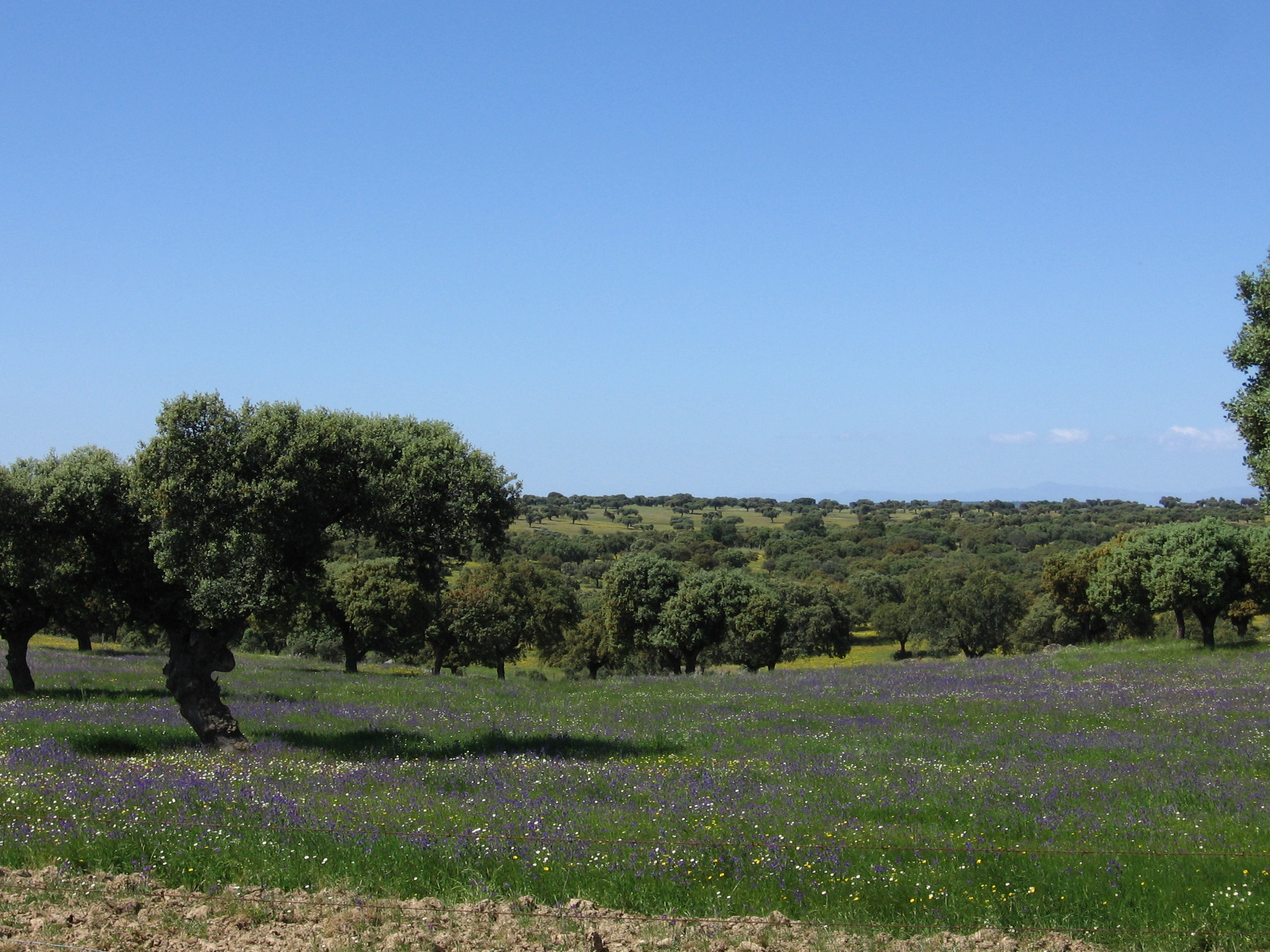
Dehesa/montado, a very species-rich, semi-natural wood-pasture landscape type of the Iberian peninsula.

Grazed woodlands, wood-pastures and pastures in Europe harbour high biodiversity. Rare perennial plant species commonly or exclusively associated with these ecosystems in Europe include hellebores, peonies, asphodels, dittany, black false hellebore and bastard balm. The tree layer is often dominated by a number of oak species and many rare, local and threatened species such as Florentine wild apple, Lebanese wild apple, medlar, sorb tree, pears and wild plums are more often found in European silvopastoral systems than in commercial forest. Rare or declining bird species such as the European roller, hoopoe, several species of shrike, owls (scops owl, little owl) as well as wrynecks and middle spotted woodpeckers are attracted by wood-pastures in particular. In Iberia, the semi-natural oak-woodlands known as dehesa/montado are home to endemic species such as the Spanish imperial eagle and the Iberian lynx. Wood-pastures also provide important habitat for many species of invertebrates. Due to the abundance of large, old trees, wood-pastures are especially important for saproxylic beetles. This includes spectacular and rare species such as capricorn beetle, stag beetles (such as Lucanus cervus), variable chafer and click beetles. In the British Isles alone nearly 1800 species of invertebrates depend on decaying wood, including 700 species of beetles and about 730 species of flies.

=== Traditional land use ===
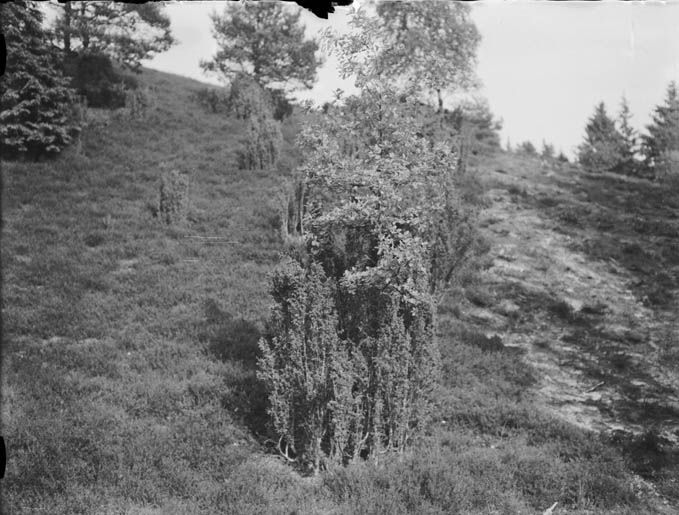
A young oak utilises an established juniper bush as protection against browsing in a historical wood-pasture.

Many aspects of Vera's theory resonate well with traditional pastoral systems and agricultural practices across Europe and other parts of the world. This is especially true for regions where the pasturing of grazing animals has been carried out for hundreds and thousands of years. The old English saying "The thorn is the mother of the oak", referring to the recruitment of oaks inside thorny shrubs, attests to the knowledge about processes such as associational resistance as part of old traditional farming knowledge that was present in rural communities well before the theory itself was proposed in its current form. The phrase is commonly attributed to Humphry Repton, but was used by the writer Arthur Standish as early as 1613 and probably has origins even earlier. Following Vera's argumentation, wood-pastures and related farming systems as ancient land-use systems can also be viewed as essentially mimicking the primaeval European wilderness. This goes hand-in-hand with the fact that, for instance, 63 of the ecosystems listed in Annex I of the Habitats Directive of the European Union strictly depend on low-intensity use and maintenance work, mostly in the form of grazing and mowing. These habitats are labelled as high nature value farmland (HNV farmland), and the fact that traditional farming, in particular, can potentially harbour exceptional biodiversity values may in part be due to such mimicking effects that some forms of human use (such as grazing, pollarding, coppicing and hedgelaying) have in analogy to ecosystem services formerly exercised by the megafauna.

=== Sergey Zimov's megaherbivore decline model ===
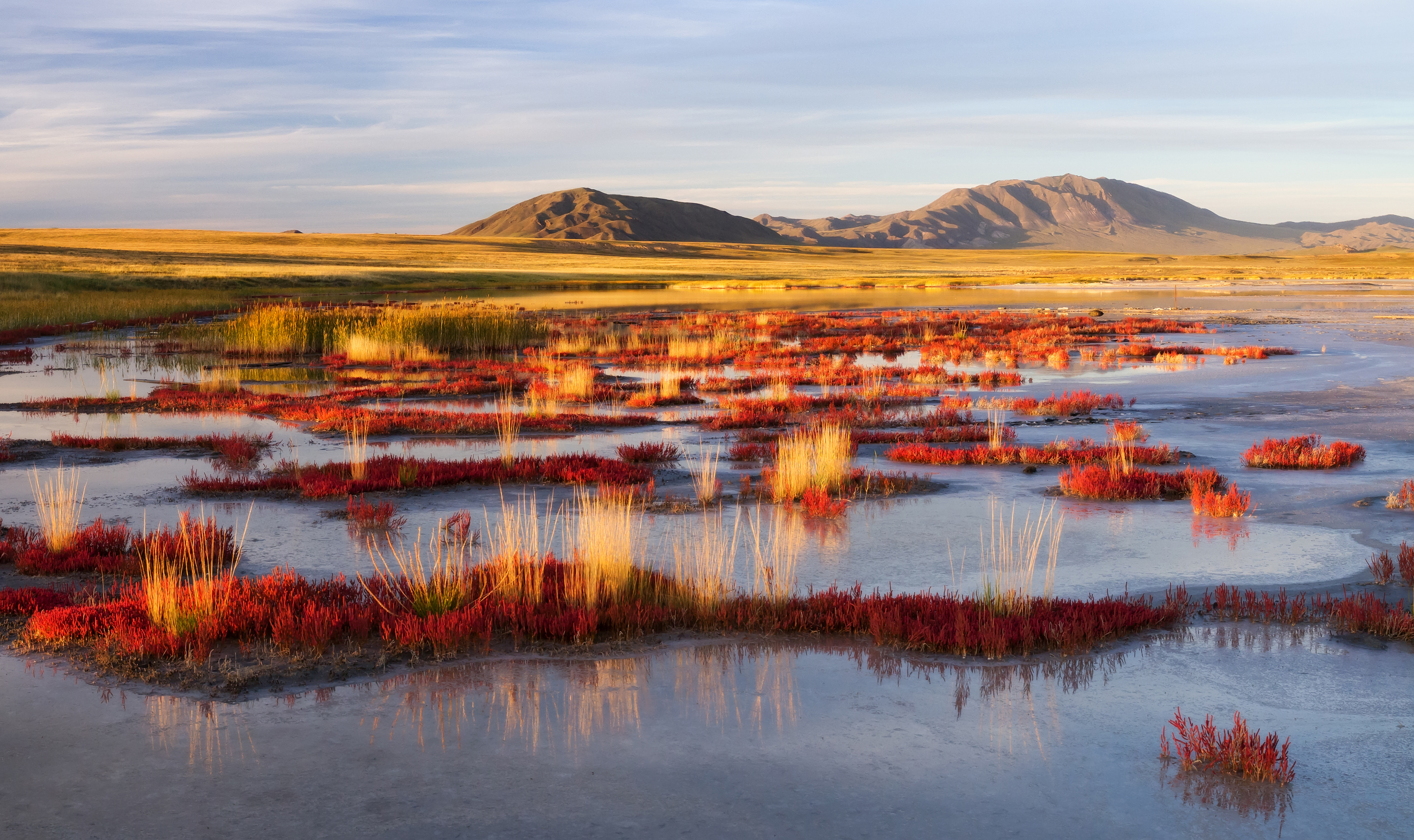
Modern remains of the mammoth steppe, still found at scattered sites in Siberia, can serve as a model for larger-scale restoration.

While Vera's hypothesis focuses on temperate regions and especially temperate Europe, an argumentatively related model has more recently been proposed for high latitude regions of modern taiga and tundra biomes, where formerly mammoth steppe predominated. It essentially challenges the widespread view that the Pleistocene megafauna of the northern steppe vanished as a consequence of the warming climate at the advent of the Holocene and the consequent turnover of cold-adapted grassland and herb ecosystems into expanding forests and tundra dominated by mosses, lichens and dwarf trees. Instead, it argues that vice versa the declining megafauna was the precondition for the vegetational turnover, and that healthy megafauna populations could have maintained their preferred environment, the mammoth steppe, even under the stresses of the warming climate if human-induced extinctions had not occurred. Consequently, Sergey Zimov, one of the main supporters of this model, proposes that ecosystems functionally similar to the mammoth steppe of the Pleistocene could also function under modern circumstances, and seeks to prove this in the form of Pleistocene park. He and his son have since begun to reintroduce species that are now extinct in Yakutia, and to introduce species that are ecologically similar to those present in the region during the Pleistocene that have since become globally extinct. These include wild species like reindeer, muskox, bison and wisent, as well as hardy domestic breeds like Bactrian camels, Kalmyk cattle, domestic yaks and Orenburg goats. With these, the project hopes to revive the mammoth steppe, at least in fractions of its former expanse.

== See also ==
- New Forest – An ancient common with a significant proportion of wood pasture
- Moccas Park
- Hatfield Forest
- Windsor Great Park
- Epping Forest
- Zuid-Kennemerland National Park
- Marcescence – possibly an adaptation to prevent browsing of twigs and buds in winter
- Globally Important Agricultural Heritage Systems

== Sources ==
- Vera, F. W. M., ed. (2000). Grazing ecology and forest history. doi:10.1079/9780851994420.0000. ISBN 978-0-85199-442-0.
