= Oak regeneration failure =

Forest regeneration phenomenon

Oak regeneration failure is a woodland phenomenon whereby insufficient oak (Quercus) seedlings and saplings are recruited into the canopy to replace dead mature oaks. The result is a local decline in oak numbers while other more shade-tolerant trees such as maple, lime, and ash may become more prominent. Oak regeneration failure has been observed across Eastern and Midwestern forests in the United States as well as in Europe.

== History ==
The failure of oak regeneration has been recognised for centuries. Early evidence of challenges to oak regeneration can be found in French ordinances from the 13th century which mandated the planting of oak seedlings to ensure that harvesting did not exceed production, due to oak's high timber value and versatility. Great Britain imported oak from colonial America to make up for the shortage in Britain. One of the first government-sponsored pieces of forestry research in America was to promote the growth of live oak (Quercus virginiana), which was used for shipbuilding.

Oak remained a significant source of lumber even after wooden ships were no longer in use. Concerns about its regeneration persisted as forestry developed. In the early 1900s, researchers studied forests in the American Midwest and South. They found that oaks could maintain their dominance in the next generation after clearcutting a forest lot if there was significant advance regeneration or disturbance from fire. However, they declined in many other cases.

Oak appeared to regenerate more freely in the distant past than in modern times, which may in part be due to obsolete or declining woodland management practices as well as local site ecology.

== Causes ==
Oak regeneration failure may be caused by various factors at different stages of the oak's lifecycle. Among these, seedling growth and survival are critical stages that determine the success or failure of oak regeneration. This is especially true during a seedling’s first summer after germination. Oak is a light-demanding genus, so the survivorship of seedlings recruited into the canopy is mainly determined by incident light levels on the woodland floor. These light levels are, in turn, governed by gaps in the woodland canopy.

As well as limiting the levels of incident light onto the woodland floor, mature oaks can also impede growth of seedlings by dropping on them leaf-eating caterpillars. The caterpillars can proceed to defoliate the seedlings, depriving them of their energy reserves and inhibiting survival.

In unmanaged stands and under historical indigenous management in America, fire was a primary agent of creating sizable canopy gaps, enabling the recruitment of oaks into the mature canopy. However, modern forest management often entails fire exclusion, leading to smaller canopy gaps and less capacity for oaks to access the needed light. The decline of coppicing and other traditional woodland management practices have resulted in a similar situation in Britain and Europe.

Successful regeneration relies on the production and dispersal of sufficient acorns for regeneration. In the wake of extensive logging, many forests in the United States have more simplified and homogeneous stand compositions compared to natural stands. Because acorn production declines with age, this may lead to a decrease in acorn dispersal, endangering the next generation of oaks.

Oaks are also under threat from pests, pathogens, and animal browsing, all of which damage the vulnerable understory trees that replace older oaks. For example, the arrival of a non-native powdery mildew pathogen in European woodlands and forests in the early 1900s gave rise to concerns about the regenerative failure of the widespread native pedunculate oak (Quercus robur).

Powdery mildew is a prominent example of a pathogen hampering oak regeneration. In affected pedunculate oaks, research shows that powdery mildew makes them more light-demanding, reducing their competitiveness with other tree species (known as the pathogen mildew hypothesis), and making them succumb to even a small degree of shade which they may otherwise have survived.

Predation of oaklings by browsing herbivores such as deer can also have a deleterious effect on oak regeneration. Moreover, because fencing and other exclusion methods are cost-prohibitive, deer are also able to browse freely on many managed forests, which reduces oak competitiveness because they are a favored species of the herbivores.

Oaks are generally tolerant of browsing under sufficient light conditions, and in Europe can still regenerate in transitional habitats such as forest edges, fallows and abandoned grassland, habitats where Eurasian jays, the most important disperser of European oaks, prefer to deposit acorns. Nonetheless, studies on oak regeneration commonly focus on closed-canopy forest. Therefore, it has been suggested that the main reason for oak regeneration failure in Europe is land-use changes since the early modern period, with the abandonment of wood-pastures, pannage and forest grazing and the more homogenous landscapes this brought about. Overall, oaks appear to be specialized colonizers of formerly grazed grassland or areas recently burned, which would render the search for oak regeneration inside forests futile from the outset. According to the Vera hypothesis it has consequently been suggested that oaks are originally adapted to regenerate in savanna-like habitats shaped by large herbivores. Indeed, extensive grazing followed by temporary abandonment can result in almost closed stands of oak.

== Impact ==
Oak regeneration failure can have a significant economic impact since oak is a crucial tree genus in many American and European forests. Moreover, it has been estimated that as few as 4% of oak-dominated forests in the Eastern U.S. have sufficient oaks to replace the current canopy.

Oak forests comprise 51% (78.5 million ha) of U.S. forestland. As such, they have high economic value and ecological importance. Many animal species, especially among insects, prefer the composition and structure of oak forest types over others, and regional-scale declines in oak forest are shown to have deleterious impacts on animal populations.

Modern efforts are focused on sustaining pre-modern conditions through such tactics as reintroducing fire to forests that were previously under natural or indigenous fire regimes and creating deer exclusion zones to reduce the intensity of browsing. Scientists are also studying how climate change will impact the regeneration of oaks. Some models suggest that oaks will rise in prominence as warming temperatures favour their proliferation in certain habitats over other species, but changes in temperature and precipitation patterns are also likely to have adverse effects on oaks, particularly young trees.
