= Celtic Rewilding =

Company supporting species reintroduction and rewilding

The entrance to the Celtic Rewilding Captive Breeding Facility in 2026

Celtic Rewilding, formally known as Celtic Reptile & Amphibian, is a conservation company, established in 2020, by Harvey Tweats and Tom Whitehurst, with the initial aim of reintroducing extinct reptiles and amphibians back to rewilding projects within the UK. However, the company's scope has since broadened to all lost species of the UK and northern Europe. It is based in Leek, Staffordshire.

== History ==
The company was conceptualised after founder Harvey Tweats visited the River Otter beaver trial, where Eurasian Beavers were reintroduced, creating habitats that would have supported extinct amphibian species, as they are ecosystem engineers. However, the beaver was hunted to extinction in the 16th century and together with wetland drainage, caused amphibian species slipped into extirpation, only for beavers to be released hundreds of years later, creating the correct conditions in the modern world for the possible reintroduction of such extinct amphibian species. The only way these species could return is through direct human intervention. Later, Tom Whitehurst joined, handling the technical and accounting aspects of Celtic Reptile & Amphibian (now Celtic Rewilding).

In 2020, a site was developed to help upscale the breeding effort with financial help from a range of environmentalists, including Ben Goldsmith. The breeding facility is the largest of its type, dedicated only to European species in an open-air environment. Eventually it will house more reptiles than Chester Zoo.

Thus far, success has been achieved with the moor frog, as it has been successfully bred in captivity by the company, sparking talk of reintroduction, as it was likely extirpated by peat harvesting and large-scale wetland drainage, in western Europe and England, such as undertaken in the Fens during the 16th-17th centuries.

In response to worries about the potential transfer of diseases (like chytrid which causes chytridiomycosis) from captive animals to the wild, a biosecurity protocol was enacted. It included ecologically certified newt fences, sanitising stations and foot-dips. All breeding stock is tested with PCR testing.

In 2025, Tweats completed a landmark Churchill Fellowship thesis entitled "Investigating the Status of Britain's Lost Frogs: Prospects for Rewilding" which examined the evidence for native status of amphibian species lost from Britain in historical times. It also discussed perhaps whether reintroductions should proceed. The second stage of work, including feasibility studies, disease risk analysis, and ecological interactions assessments are being financed by Rewilding Britain. Releases have to be authorised by UK Nature watchdog, Natural England and are due to be carried out in carefully selected sites in Norfolk, including the Westacre Estate.

== Proposed species for reintroduction ==
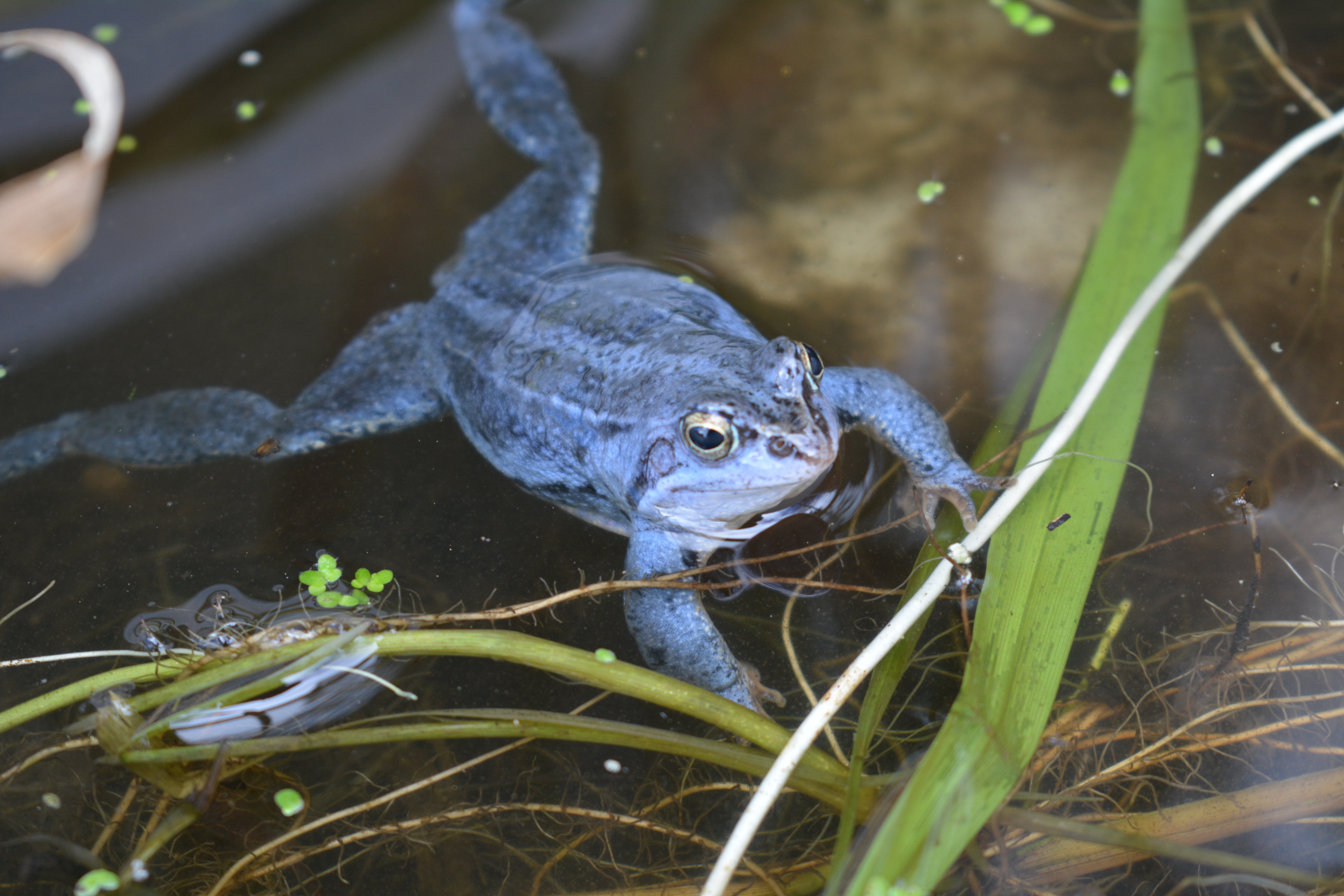
A blue male moor frog in 2021, as part of the successful captive breeding project.

Celtic Rewilding undertake research with many partners. This is focussed on feasibility of species reintroduction and examining evidence for species native status.

Currently, 6 species of herptile are classed as extirpated in the UK, and suitable for reintroduction;

- Agile frog (Rana dalmatina) - extinct reliably in the 9th century, as indicated by subfossil remains, however the species is likely to have clung on for far longer, possibly into the 19th century. The species likely became extinct in Britain due to deforestation, as on the northern edge of its range, such as Sweden, it requires deciduous woodland of an open quality in order to foster the exacting climatological requires it needs. It has already been reinforced via reintroduction on Jersey, by Durrell Wildlife Conservation Trust.
- European tree frog (Hyla arborea) - while a potential native colony survived until 1987, reliable historical records suggest that this species was found in Britain by at least the 16th century, for example Sir Thomas Browne wrote in 1646; "...the little frog of an excellent Parrat green, that usually sits on [t]rees and [b]ushes, and is therefore called Ranunculus viridis, or arboreus...", thus it is listed a possible extinct native. There is contention surrounding whether the original population is of natural or human descent.
- European pond turtle (Emys orbicularis) - see below section.
- Pool frog (Pelophylax lessonae) - this is the only species in which it has already been reintroduced to Britain, both intentionally and accidentally.
- Moor frog (Rana arvalis) - several subfossil specimens represent this species, showing it was native to East Anglia at least in the 9th century. Historical references occur from the 13th to 18th centuries, including "Rana palustres" by Bartholomeus Anglicus and "livid (blueish) frogs" from John Morton in 1712. Furthermore, research indicates that fenland drainage and deforestation were the most likely factors in the species' demise during the Early Modern to Industrial Period.

Other species:

- White stork (Ciconia ciconia) - Celtic Rewilding hold a small captive colony of white stork, which produce young for release into wetland rewilding projects. In 2025, they produced the Staffordshire Moorlands' first chick for several centuries. In 2026, it was announced that the organisation had partnered with Derbyshire Wildlife Trust to reintroduce them to the Midlands, including at Willington Wetlands Nature Reserve, for the first time in several hundred years. The project, costing £300,000 in the initial stages, has been funded by the Veolia Environmental Trust. In July 2026, three white stork chicks bred at Celtic Rewilding were released into a purpose built release aviary at Willington Wetlands Reserve. The release was covered heavily by the media, with a section on Countryfile devoted to the project. Storks are an enchanting, attractive species, with the project aiming to catalyse wetland restoration via the umbrella species concept. Storks need a diverse prey-base of chiefly amphibians. Therefore, the restoration of lost frogs species goes hand-in-hand with white stork reintroduction.

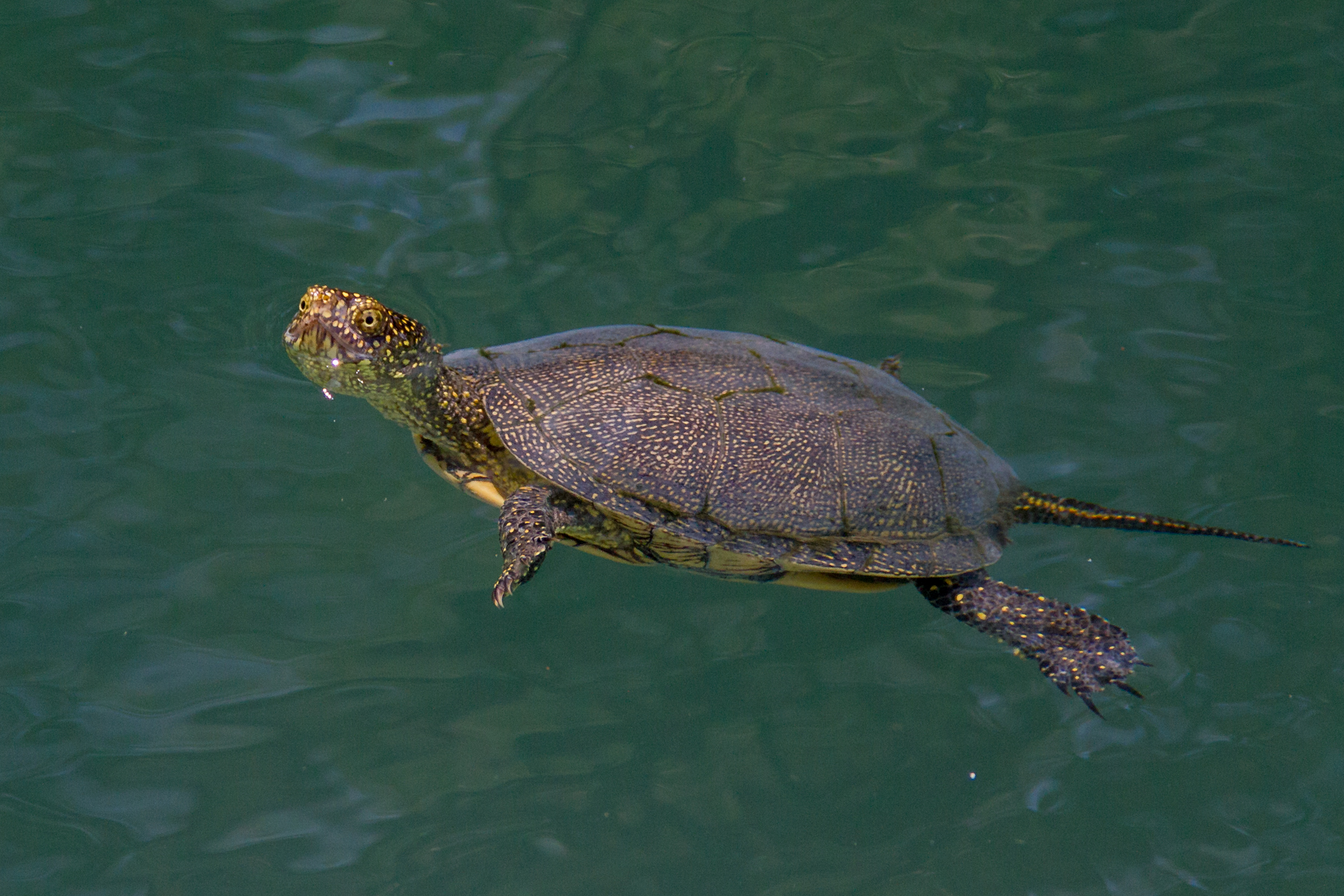
A swimming European pond turtle, a species the organisation wants to reintroduce.

== Reintroduction of the European pond turtle ==
The organisation is pursuing the trail and scientific investigation of a re-establishment of the European pond turtle, as a flagship species reintroduction in the face of climate change and the growing popularity of rewilding. Surviving until the Neolithic, this chelonian qualifies as a native British species as evidenced by fossils and sedaDNA analysis, however, it most likely became extinct due to a combination of climatic deterioration, habitat destruction and hunting. With a warming climate, the trial could serve as a case-study example of the growing popularity of assisted colonisation as a way of mitigating the effects of climate change on wildlife populations. By moving a species with its climate envelope, biodiversity loss can be mitigated. This is not the first example of a reintroduction where a species, nor even a chelonian, has been re-established in an area last inhabited in prehistoric times: the Bolson tortoise has been reintroduced to its Pleistocene range in the south-east USA where it was extirpated for 13,000 years.

The first step in the trial of the European pond turtle, is the creation of a large (3 ha), naturalistic enclosure similar to the reintroduction of the Bolson tortoise to the USA, as this helps to 'heft' females to a nesting location, building site fidelity. European pond turtles are very faithful to nesting locations. Celtic Rewilding have worked with the University of Cambridge and Swansea University to develop a project feasibility study for the restoration of this species. They propose a trial release into a fenced area to investigate the impact (positive or negative) on native species and the incubation success of the turtle. This enclosure has been built at the Westacre Estate within and near to the East Anglian Broads, Brecks, and Fens. There, it is climatically suitable and close to East Wretham, where the turtle fossils were discovered in 1836 and subsequently described by Alfred Newton. The enclosure will have several water bodies to allow the turtles' impact to be monitored and to investigate how successfully they can breed in the UK. A feasibility study has shown that the turtles could have the following positive impacts:

- Bioturbation. The movement of the turtles through both the water column and the silt, will stir up stagnant water and sediment, potentially improving nutrient availability and water quality.
- Seed dispersal. European pond turtles feed on a variety of plant species, some of which are limited in spreading to over water-bodies. Because the turtles can easily walk over land, they aid in the spread of such plant species.
- Improving water quality. European pond turtles regularly eat carrion. Because of this fact and their non-dependency on oxygen rich water, it is believed that they can remove excess nutrients from the polluted water bodies, for example, after a fish kill. Therefore, the species can potentially make wetlands more resilient to warmer summers brought on by climate change, when there is a risk of lethal algal blooms.

So far, Celtic Rewilding have initiated a crowdfunding campaign and have imported 60, genetically appropriate turtles from Bavaria. They have garnered support from Professor William J. Sutherland and TV presenter Nigel Marven. Also, the construction of quarantine and holding facilities has commenced. The project will run for 5 years. The organisation has the largest captive group of the species.

== Rewilding efforts ==
The company also helps to advise estates, NGOs and farmers on how they can rewild their landholdings. They define rewilding as “the large scale restoration of ecosystems through the provision of protecting land from human uses, and re-introducing lost natural processes with the ultimate aim of letting nature take care of itself. This may include, but not limited to, the reintroduction of extinct species”. Currently, the company advises on land totalling 45,000 hectares. Celtic Rewilding works as a consultant for farms and estates that want to maximise biodiversity gains in order deliver financial returns often greater than typical agriculture or other land uses, helping boost business resilience in a time of climate and geopolitical shocks.

Celtic Rewilding have been instrumental to the reintroduction of beavers to Staffordshire and Lincolnshire. In Lincolnshire, they have partnered with renown giftware firm, Wrendale Designs to return the species.

== Media appearances and productions ==
The Celtic Rewilding Team and Countryfile presenter Margherita Taylor at the Breeding Facility filming a 2026 episode of Countryfile.

Celtic Rewilding's facilities are built to facilitate numerous video shoots per year. The organisation has contributed to and/or advised on the production of the following:

- Channel 5 News
- ITV News
- The One Show
- Steph's Packed Lunch
- BBC Breakfast
- BBC Midlands Today
- Escape to the Country
- Countryfile
- Teeny Tiny Creatures
- 28 Years Later: The Bone Temple (as ecological advisors)
- Hidden Planet (an upcoming BBC/Netflix blue chip documentary series)
