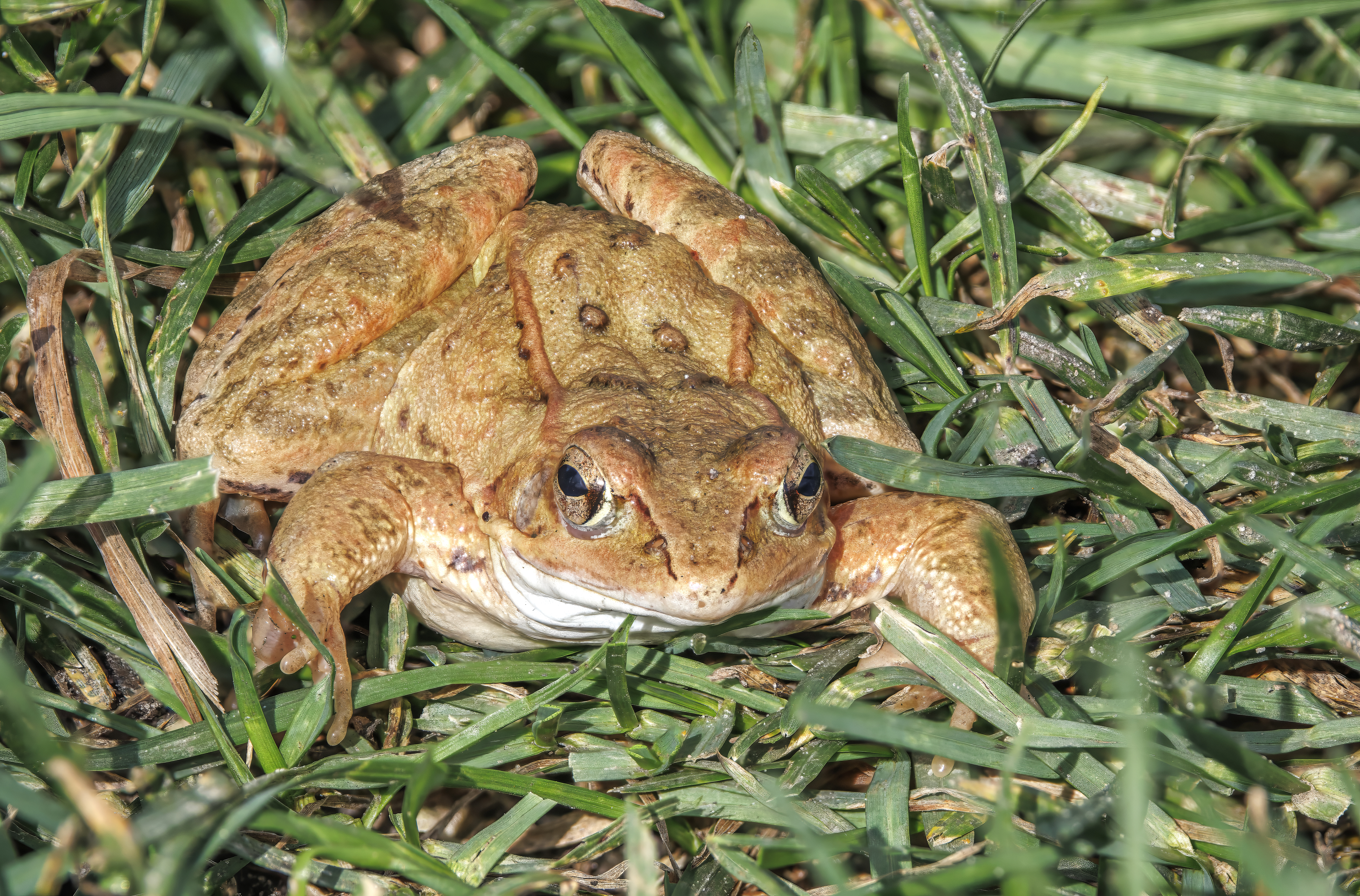

Conservation status
- Least Concern (IUCN 3.1)

Scientific classification
- Kingdom: Animalia
- Phylum: Chordata
- Class: Amphibia
- Order: Anura
- Family: Ranidae
- Genus: Rana
- Species: R. arvalis

Binomial name
- Rana arvalis Nilsson, 1842
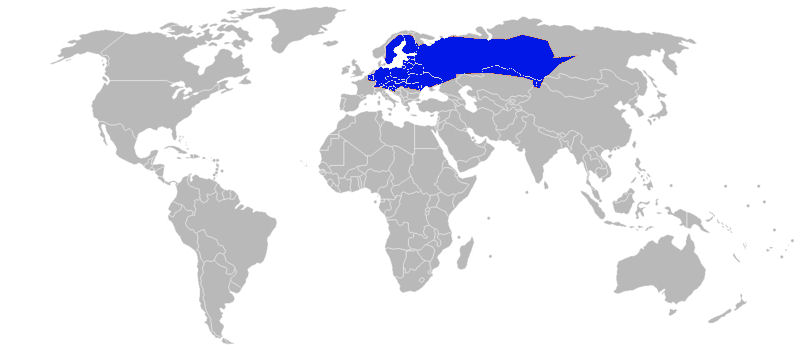

= Moor frog =

Species of amphibian

The moor frog (Rana arvalis) is a slim, reddish-brown, semiaquatic amphibian native to Europe and Asia. Moor frogs are known for their ability to freeze solid and survive thawing. The frog makes use of various cryoprotectants i.e. antifreeze that decrease its internal freezing temperature. The species is distributed over a large range, covering a significant portion of Eurasia. Male moor frogs are known to turn blue temporarily during the height of mating season. This coloration is assumed to signal a mate's fitness. Moor frogs typically mate through multimale amplexus, a form of polyandry.

The moor frog spawns its eggs in large batches in still bodies of acidic waters. Human-caused pollution is causing excessive acidification of habitat which harms egg health. The moor frog's habitat is also under destruction due to a variety of other anthropogenic means. The species has an IUCN listing of Least Concern. However, a majority of European states independently consider the conservation status of the moor frog to be unfavorable. The moor frog, like other members of Rana, is omnivorous and will consume anything that it can physically ingest.

== Description ==
The moor frog is a medium to large bog frog, characterized by a mixture of brown (back) and white (front) coloration, with small dark spots on the throat. The species is reddish-brown, but can also be yellow, grey, or light-olive. Common traits include white or yellow pigmentation on its underside and black stripes from its nostrils along the sides of its head. The Moor frog ranges from 5.5 to 6.0 cm (2.2 to 2.4 in) long, but can reach up to 7.0 cm (2.8 in) in length. Their heads are more tapered than those of the common frog (Rana temporaria), but the most reliable way to tell the species apart is by looking at their metatarsal tubercle, a small spur on the hind feet next to the innermost toe: in common frog it is soft and small, less than a third of the length of the innermost toe, while in moor frog it is hard and approximately half the length of the innermost toe. Common frog and moor frog also have different calls, and for a short period during the breeding season moor frog males may become blue in color, while common frog males at most get a faint blueish tint.

The skin on their flanks and thighs is smooth, and their tongue is forked and free. Pupils are horizontally oriented, feet are partially webbed, and back legs are shorter than those in the same family of frogs. Males, unlike females, have nuptial pads on their first fingers and paired guttural vocal sacs.

== Taxonomy ==
The family the moor frog belongs to, Ranidae, is a broad group containing 605 species. The family contains ranoid frogs that do not belong to any other families and are found on every continent but Antarctica. The moor frog belongs to genus Rana, which includes species found in Europe, Asia, and North America. The moor frog is not found in the Americas.

The moor frog's scientific name, Rana arvalis, means "frog of the fields". It is also called the Altai brown frog because frogs from the Altai Mountains in Asia have been included in the R. arvalis species. The Altai frogs have some different characteristics such as shorter shins, but currently there is no official distinction and all frogs are known as one species—Rana arvalis.

The moor frog was first reported by Nilsson in volume 3 of Skandinavisk fauna with a moderate muzzle and prominent first cuneiform bone.

== Distribution and habitat ==
The moor frog can be found over a vast majority of mainland, central Eurasia; its longitudinal range extends from northeastern France and northern Belgium all the way east to the Lena River in Siberia, in and around the city of Novosibirsk. Their latitudinal distribution extends from the 69th parallel in Finland south through the Pannonian Basin and the inland Balkans in Central Europe.

The moor frog can be found surviving at varied levels of altitudes; in the western, more European areas of its range, the frog can be found as high as 900 metres (3,000 ft) above sea level. Further east in its range, such as in the Altai Mountains, the moor frog is found as high up as 2 kilometres (6,600 ft) above sea level. Within the higher-elevation ranges, the species is often found near bodies of still (or very slow-moving) water, with adequate riparian or littoral vegetation surrounding it. These water sources are often rich in decomposing organic material, resulting in a considerably acidic pH level, often at, or below, a 6. The diversity of habitats demonstrates the frog's plasticity.

Moor frogs can live in near-tundra conditions, taiga, conifer forest, forest steppe, dry steppe, open forest, glades, chaparral-like (arid) areas, swamp, meadows, fields, bushland, and private farms or water gardens (though they tend to prefer areas away from humans and predators). Nonetheless, they are adaptable, and are often seen in such urban spots as city-adjacent meadows, bogs, pastures, or public parks.

Moor frogs provide a good model for studying local adaptation as they experience a wide range of environments and are relatively limited in their movements. Their restriction in movements implies limited gene flow and facilitates evolution through adaptive genetic differentiation among populations.

=== Historical distribution ===
The earliest fossil record of the moor frog extends back to between the Pliocene and Early Pleistocene found in Dvorníky-Včeláre, Slovakia. Other fossil records of the moor frog from the early Pleistocene were found on land inside the modern range of the moor frog. Fossil records from the middle Pleistocene demonstrate the range extended as far south as south-central France and as far west as the eastern coast of Great Britain. Records from the late Pleistocene show the range extended as far south as Bosnia and Herzegovina and Azerbaijan. In the Holocene, the moor frog also had a wider distribution until the Early Modern period, when widespread land-drainage became technologically and economically viable. Widespread peat-cutting also impacts the species, especially in its range edge.

=== Distribution in Romania ===
The moor frog is found in three regions in Romania. The first is the Transylvanian region which includes the Western Plains (with the largest Romanian population of moor frogs), the Transylvanian Plateau, and the Eastern Carpathians. The second region is the northern part of Romanian Moldavia. The third and smallest region is the Tisa River Basin—north of Maramureș. Most populations of moor frog in Romania are isolated and not contiguous due to the edge effects of human developments. Each population typically has 200–400 adults; however, exceptional populations of 2000 adults have been found as well. Most Romanian populations of moor frog can be found between 108 and 414 metres (354 and 1,358 ft) above sea level; exceptional populations have been found to exist at 740 metres (2,430 ft) above sea level.

In Romania, the moor frog is known to live in humid habitats that border land with human activity, such as flooded agricultural fields, ditches on the side of roads, small canals and streams, and human settlements. The moor frog is sparingly found in habitats with little human activity. Swamps are one of the few habitats with little human activity that host moor frogs.

== Diet ==
An adult moor frog's diet consists of any mobile and terrestrial animals that they can physically ingest. Moor frogs most commonly consume beetles; however, other insects from the orders hemiptera (true bugs), hymenoptera, and diptera (flies) are consumed as well. Moor frogs also consume non-insect invertebrates from the orders gastropoda (snails and slugs), arachnida, and myriapoda (centipedes and millipedes). Beetles make up the majority of the moor frog's diet due to their abundance. Large moor frogs do appear to have a preference for beetles because they are larger than most other insect prey.

Large moor frogs tend to consume large prey and small moor frogs consume small prey. This behavior is assumed to have evolved to reduce competition between moor frogs or to maximize net energy gained from feeding, as large moor frogs consuming both large and small prey would leave little food for smaller moor frogs. Aside from size preferences, individual moor frogs do not appear to prefer more energetically favorable prey over less energetically favorable prey of equal size. The moor frog will ingest any animal that it is able to swallow.

Moor frogs are opportunistic predators that wait for prey to appear before consuming them, as opposed to intentional predators that actively hunt for prey. More mobile prey are more often consumed by the moor frog because of their opportunistic nature.

Plant matter and inedible objects such as pebbles are also found to be consumed by the moor frog. Plant matter is found to be consumed in greater quantities when more prey has been consumed, which suggests that plant matter is consumed accidentally during the capture of prey. The moor frog's shed skin is also consumed; however, it is unknown whether consumption of shed skin is accidental or intentional in nature.

== Mating ==
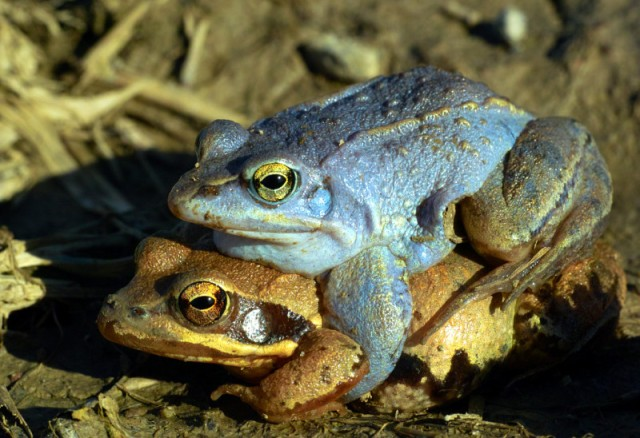
A pair of moor frogs in amplexus

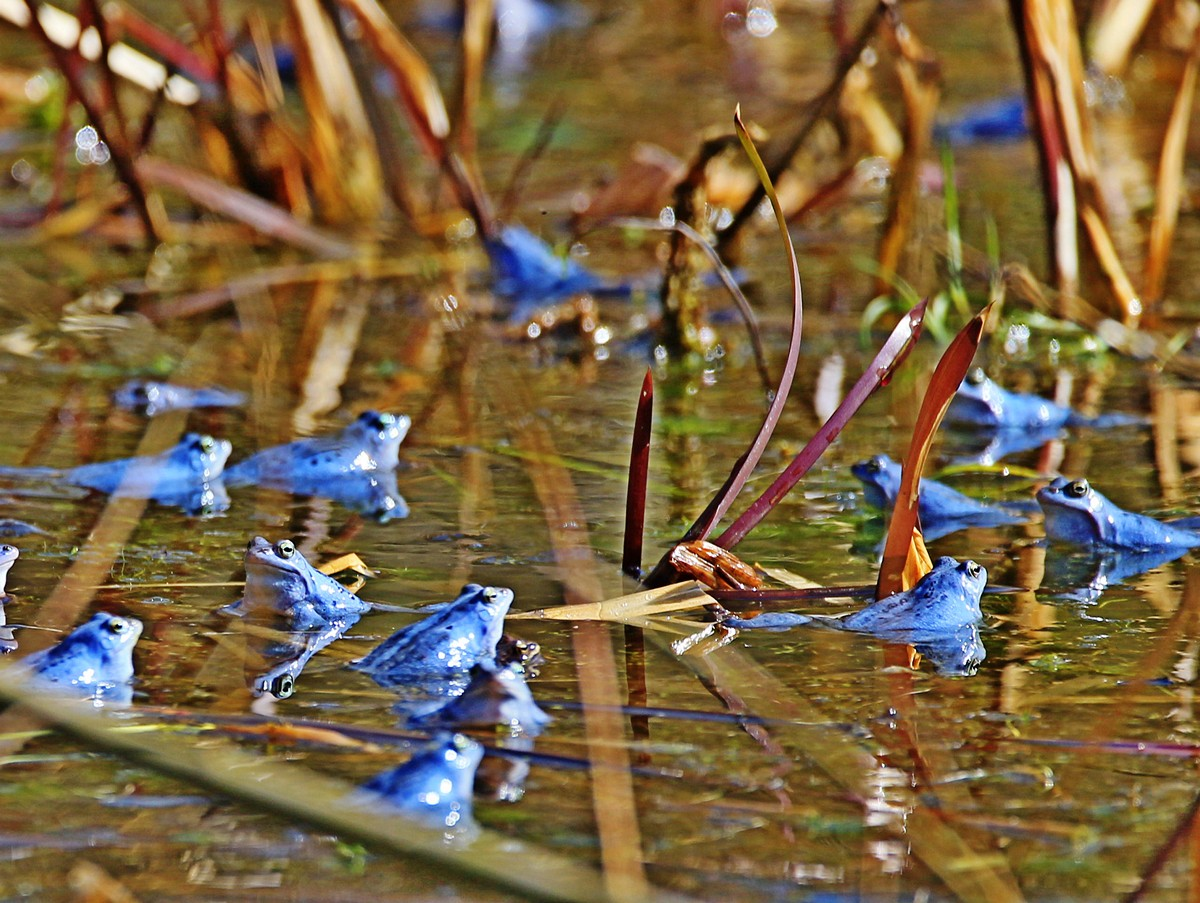
Multiple blue male moor frogs in Stadtwaldsee

Multimale amplexus, in which multiple males mate with a single female, is the predominant method of mating that the moor frog performs. The sperm of male moor frogs compete in the female reproductive tract for fertilization of the female's egg.

Female frogs do not appear to prefer males of a particular size. Instead, they tend to prefer to mate with males that have successfully helped produce offspring with them in the past.

Long thumb length is correlated with poor sperm quality, and short thumb length is correlated with higher sperm quality. Males with higher quality sperm breed progeny with greater chances of survival. Despite this correlation, female individuals do not appear to prefer thumb length or be able to detect variation in thumb length.

=== Blue coloration ===
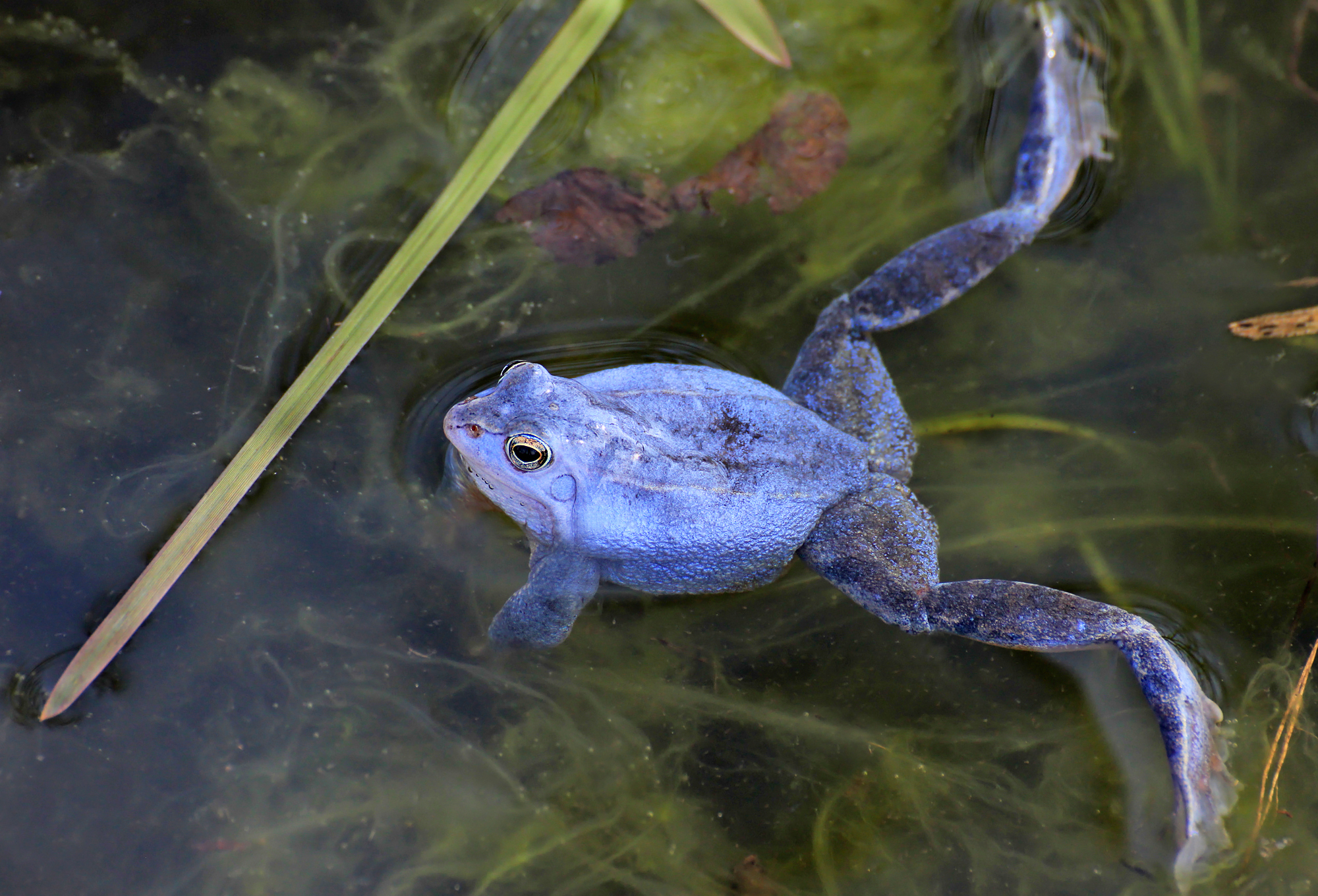
A male moor frog is colored blue for a few days during the height of the mating season.

Male moor frogs turn a conspicuous blue during the mating season, but only for a few days during peak reproductive activity. Females remain brown during this time. While the blue is conspicuous to human vision, the greatest color change in male moor frogs occurs in the ultraviolet region from 350 to 450 nm, invisible to human vision. Males who have mated appear bluer and have been recorded as having higher body temperatures.

Blue reflectance may be a form of intersexual communication. It is hypothesized that males with brighter blue coloration may signal greater sexual and genetic fitness; however, studies have only revealed tadpoles fathered by bright blue individuals had greater chances of survival when pitted against large beetle larvae than when fathered by dull individuals.

== Ecology ==
=== Hibernation ===
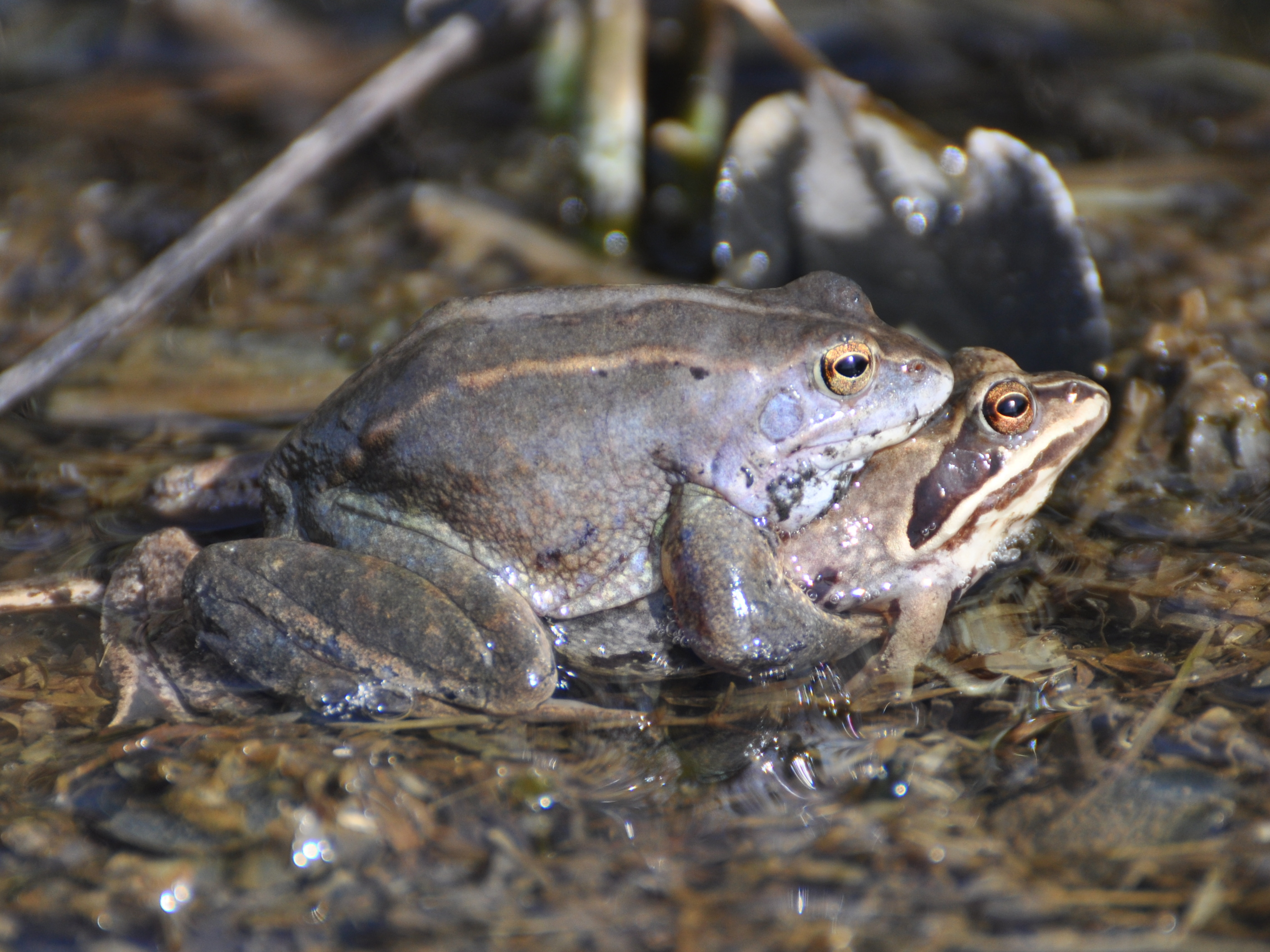
A pair of moor frogs in amplexus near Hamburg, Germany

Moor frogs hibernate sometime between September and June, depending on their latitude. Frogs in southwestern plain habitats will hibernate (around November or December) and wake earlier (February). However, frogs in cold, polar areas will hibernate sooner (in September) and wake later (in June).

=== Breeding ===
The mating season takes place between March and June, right after the end of hibernation. Males form breeding choruses that may sound similar to air escaping from a submerged empty bottle, similar to those of the agile frog Rana dalmatina. Males can also develop bright-blue coloration for a few days during the season.

Spawning happens quickly and is completed in 3 to 28 days. The spawn of each frog is laid in one or two clusters of 500–3000 eggs in warm, shallow waters.

=== Effects of acidification on population ===
==== Environmental plasticity ====
Increased acidity levels in breeding areas may be problematic for moor frog populations, as it reduces survival and growth of the aquatic embryos and larvae. When exposed to acidity, moor frogs have been shown to be able to adapt relatively rapidly (within 16–40 generations). Local adaptation to acidity is also possible in survival during the embryonic stage, during which frogs are most sensitive to severe acidity. Moreover, compared to those from neutral sites, acidic origin populations have higher embryonic and larval acid tolerance (survival and larval period were less negatively affected by low pH), higher larval growth but slower larval development rates, and larger metamorphosing size. Divergence in embryonic acid tolerance and metamorphic size correlates most strongly with breeding pond pH, whereas divergence in larval period and larval growth correlates most strongly with latitude and predator density, respectively.

Moor frogs can adapt to the various effects of acidification through long-term selection causing genetic change or spontaneous behavioral changes mediated by hormonal responses. Stressors that demand immediate solutions, such as a sudden shift in temperature or appearance of a predator, demand that an individual can respond appropriately, such as moving to a more temperate location or evading or fighting off a predator. The extent to which an individual can adapt to respond to a new situation is referred to as an individual's phenotypic plasticity. These plastic adaptations can be quantitatively analyzed through the measurement of hormones that spike when individuals are under stress, such as cortisol. Moor frog tadpoles use and understand a variety of chemicals that signal stressors, and acidification can chemically disrupt a tadpole's ability to receive and send signals, thus making an individual tadpole unable to respond to environmental stressors. Acid-tolerant Moor frogs are larger and more active than Moor frogs that have not acclimatized to acidification. Acid-tolerant moor frogs also exhibit stronger hormonal responses to immediate dangers like the presence of a predator, which, in turn, creates a stronger behavioral response to evade those predators.

Some acid-tolerant Moor frogs have lower levels of sodium, which may be an adaptation to acidification.

==== Maternal effects ====
Frogs from acidic environments may favor different reproductive strategies than those in more benign environments. Compared to neutral-origin females, acid-origin females tend to invest relatively more in fecundity than in egg size, invest more in their offspring than in self-maintenance, and increase their reproductive effort as their residual reproductive value decreases. Consequently, acid origin females increase the clutch size and total reproductive output with age, while neutral origin females only increase egg size but not clutch size or total reproductive output with age.

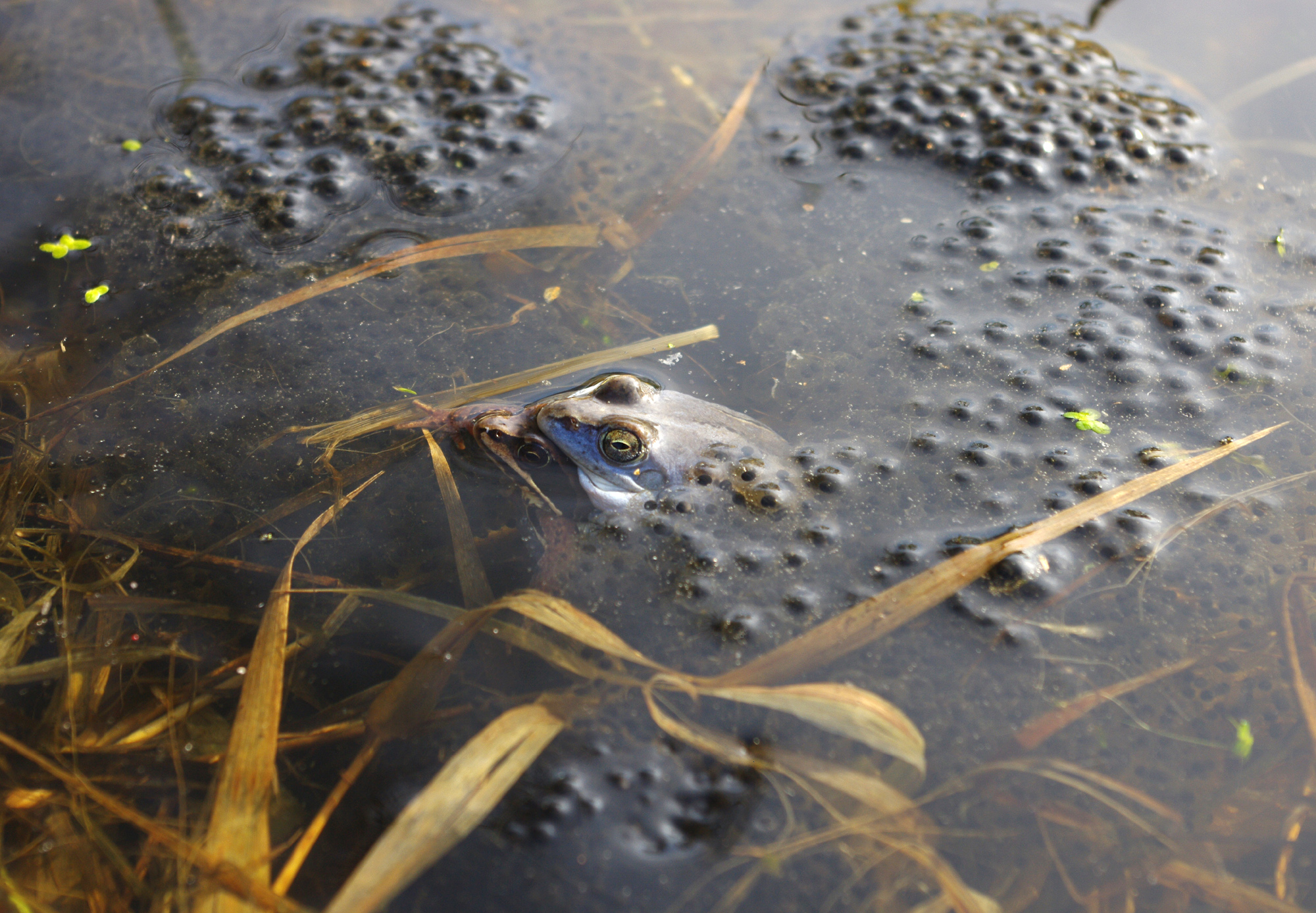
A pair of moor frogs in amplexus amongst a spawn of eggs

Environmental acidification has various reproductive impacts: decreased maternal investment, selection for investment in larger eggs at a cost to fecundity, hindered reproductive output, altered relationship between female phenotype and maternal investment, and strengthened egg-size-fecundity trade-off. High habitat acidity often imposes great costs to survival, which may lead to the culling of Moor frogs. High acidity imposes stress on eggs; when a habitat is acidic enough, embryos often exhibit developmental defects and become inviable. Egg coats are maternally derived structures that surround Moor frog eggs to protect them. Egg coats can buffer the low pH of the Moor frog's acidic habitats; however, drastic decreases in habitat pH caused by human-made pollution affects an egg coat's function. High habitat acidity causes thinning and a loss in the egg coat's ability to attract water. Thinned egg coats are more tacky and opaque. These eggs are more susceptible to drying out, pathogen infection, UV light degradation, and poor gas exchange. The disabling of the egg coat leaves an embryo defenseless and tremendously susceptible to developmental defects. Moor frogs that are more easily killed by acidic waters are less fit and their genes are lost from the gene pool. Acidification is strong enough to cause rapid adaptation due to the high selection pressure it places on the Moor frog. As a result, certain highly acidic habitats have seen the development of Moor frogs that are less sensitive to the stress of highly acidic waters. Eggs of acid-tolerant frogs have coats with a greater negative charge. This suggests glycans give the egg coat its hydrophilic properties. Acid-tolerant eggs also have egg coats that are more acidic which suggests a greater concentration of negatively charged glycans as compared to typical Moor frogs. High acidity is able to reduce an egg coat's attraction to water because high proton concentration in acidic water is able to protonate the coat, thus neutralizing a glycan's charge. This is also why high habitat pH causes egg coat glycans to deprotonate which restores the egg coat's negative charge/attraction to water.

== Physiology ==
=== Cold tolerance ===
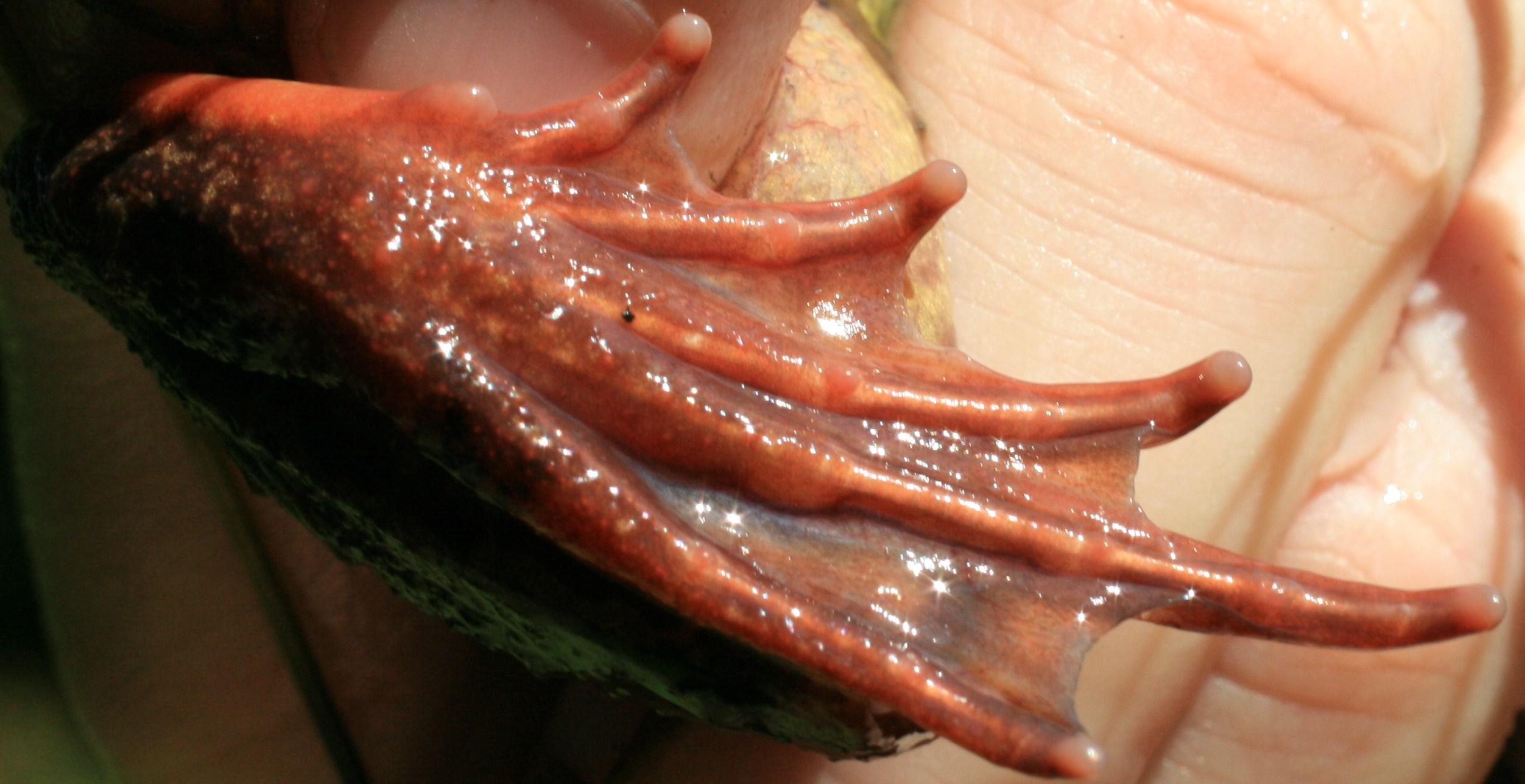
A hind foot of the moor frog

Moor frogs are renowned for their ability to tolerate freezing temperatures because most frog species live in hot and humid tropical environments. Many frogs that do live in cold climates will attempt to overwinter in bodies of water because ambient temperatures are moderated by water. In these cases, temperatures only reach a few degrees below freezing. The moor frog is only known to overwinter on land. They overwinter in pits of leaf litter and between tree stumps. Moor frogs from European Russia and Western Siberia are able to tolerate freezing to temperatures as low as −16 °C (3 °F). Moor frogs from Denmark are only able to survive freezing temperatures as low as −4 °C (25 °F) for 3 to 4 days. The minimum freezing temperatures at which frogs are able to survive with 0% mortality is different between frog populations. Minimum freezing temperatures with some chance of survival appears to decrease from Western Europe to Western Siberia. However, in the aforementioned Siberian and Danish populations mitochondrial DNA testing revealed that they were closely related.

The supercooling point (SCP) is the lowest temperature at which an organism can be cooled to (below freezing) before ice crystals form (cold-tolerant animals often use cryoprotectants that decrease the freezing temperature to prevent the formation of ice). Freeze-tolerant frogs may see up to 65% of their body freeze solid during winter. Moor frogs, like many frogs, are particularly susceptible to freezing solid because of their skin which is thin and porous—permeable to the exchange of gases and liquids. Formation of ice crystals externally can act as nucleation sites for the formation of crystals inside the moor frog. When temperatures reach below the SCP a moor frog's skin darkens, muscles become rigid, eyes dull, and solid ice can be readily felt through touch. At temperatures between 0 and 1 °C (32 and 34 °F) frogs assume normal behavior but still respond to external stimuli i.e. frogs will leap away if disturbed. At temperatures immediately below freezing frogs assume an overwintering posture with their limbs adducted. When touched at below-freezing temperatures, frogs are only capable of slight movements of the limbs and body. Siberian populations exhibit 0% mortality at −8 °C, 25% mortality at −10 °C, and 50% mortality at −12 °C. A few members from a population from Karasuk were able to freeze solid to −16 °C, thaw, and survive. The time a frog spends frozen does not seem to affect mortality rather the absolute minimum temperature they experience has the greatest effect on mortality. Frogs have been recorded to spend around 3 months in this frozen state with the potential to survive thawing.

=== Cryoprotectants ===
Freezing temperatures impose tremendous stress on the moor frog; breathing stops, circulation stops, ice forms in the tissues, and cells are severely dehydrated. To tolerate these tremendous stressors the moor frog and many other ice-tolerant animals greatly subdue metabolic processes, produce antioxidants, and use other biochemical means to make freezing tolerable i.e. cryoprotectants (anti-freeze). Moor frogs are known to use glucose as a cryoprotectant which is formed through gluconeogenesis—a natural process in livers. Because gluconeogenesis is generally restricted to the liver and glycolysis (the breakdown of glucose) continues through wintering, it is presumed there are cryoprotectants other than glucose at play in other parts of the body i.e. the muscles. Glycerol is found in much greater concentrations in the liver and muscles of frozen moor frogs. Mannose, maltose, and maltitol are also known to be in higher concentrations in the liver and muscles of frozen moor frogs; however, the change in concentration is not as drastic as the change in concentration of glycerol between frozen and non-frozen moor frogs. Freezing temperatures directly increase the rate at which glucose is broken down. The manufacture of these products all requires the use of glucose, which is stored in a polymeric form, glycogen, in the muscles. As expected, the production of these cryoprotectants and continued metabolism (even though it is slowed) consumes a great quantity of glycogen that is not replenished as the frog is not feeding during the winter.

Lactate and ethanol are found in higher concentrations in frozen moor frogs. The moor frog is the only known terrestrial vertebrate to produce ethanol as a product of glycolysis. These two molecules are products of anaerobic processes which is to be expected because breathing/aerobic processes drastically slow down to the point of stopping when the moor frog is in a frozen state. Products of the breakdown of DNA are found in higher concentrations in frozen moor frogs suggesting that freezing is a highly stressful process for the frog. Frozen moor frogs also have greater concentrations of antioxidants; which are presumably made in anticipation of the oxidative stress when aerobic respiration resumes after thawing.

=== Metabolism during freezing ===
Moor frogs still exhibit aerobic respiration at temperatures immediately below 0 °C i.e. -0.5 °C to −1 °C. However, the amount of oxygen consumed exponentially decreases with each decrease in degree Celsius. The majority of glucose degradation still occurs through anaerobic processes. Glycogen content in muscles reaches 35% in males, 20% in females, and 25% in juveniles by mass in autumn before wintering. Glycogen in the muscles also decrease much more over winter than in the liver as limbs freeze before the core does. The mass of glycogen in the liver decreased by 10 times in females and up to 30 times in males. In a study, female Moor frogs lost 82% in mass of body fat after wintering and males lost 81%.

== Conservation ==
=== Population threats ===
It is currently classified as Least Concern by the International Union for Conservation of Nature (IUCN). However, the moor frog may soon be impacted by the destruction and pollution of breeding sites and adjacent habitats, mostly through urbanization, recreational use of waterside areas, and intensive agriculture. The species does not appear to be notably susceptible to chytridiomycosis, although the fungus has been detected in frogs in Germany.

The 2009 IUCN Red List status of the moor frog does not properly reflect the current declining nature of the moor frog. There is a general lack of research on the conservation status of the moor frog in many EU member states and in-range countries. However, a European Habitats Directive performed in 2013 revealed that 19 of the 28 member states of the time reported that the conservation status of the moor frog was unfavorable. 11 of the 19 said that their status was in decline as well. It is known that existing populations in Europe are small in number which indicates a significant loss of genetic diversity. This lack of genetic diversity threatens the current stability of populations and long-term survival because of the increased risk of inbreeding.

Twelve helminth and nematode species are known to parasitize the moor frog. Trematode infection can cause the formation of cysts in larvae; particularly at areas undergoing metamorphosis. These cysts can cause the formation of extra limbs, deformation to the vertebral skeleton. Frogs with these deformations are particularly susceptible to predation by the trematode's final and definitive hosts.

=== Conservation status in France ===
The moor frog is considered nearly extinct in France where the western limit of the moor frog range extends. As of 2020, there are only four isolated populations in France. These four were once a contiguous metapopulation. In France, moor frog habitats are limited and of poor quality due to significant human development that encroaches on and destroys moor frog habitats. Edge effects of human developments also fragment and degrade remaining habitats. Mild inbreeding greatly reduces the moor frog fitness due to the small number of individuals in these isolated populations.

=== Restoration to England ===
The moor frogs Holocene range expanded to mid-France near Paris, and southern and eastern England. It likely perished in England because of a combination of widespread wetland drainage and land-use change, caused by humans. The species has been successfully bred in captivity in the UK and a reintroduction has been proposed as part of Celtic Rewilding's rewilding plans.

=== Conservation efforts ===
Acidification, eutrophication, and other forms of water pollution negatively affect the aquatic habitats of moor frogs. Moor frogs normally enjoy acidic environments; however, peat bogs which produce these acidic conditions have poor buffering properties that make them susceptible to drastic decreases of pH even below 4.5. There are various conservation practices being initiated to remediate these pH driven effects. Liming of peat bogs by adding chalk can increase pH. Acidification of freshwater aquatic habitats has the detrimental effect of reduced biodiversity. One study showed in highly acidic waters, pH 4.2, eggs of the moor frog were especially susceptible to fungal infection. Many eggs were infected and those that were had a mortality rate of 50%. Organic sediment is removed from pools before the addition of limestone particles (<3mm) to prevent eutrophication. Before liming of acidic waters, moor frog eggs can expect to be infected with fungi 75–100% of the time. Liming treatment is able to reduce the presence of fungal infection to 0–25% of the time by increasing pH to 5–6. While this method may allow for moor frog reproduction to occur in the short-term, the effect is only temporary and acidification will ultimately reoccur. Protection and addition of riparian zones by preventing grazing and replanting littoral vegetation aids the rewetting process of drained land. Drainage of land for agriculture is especially dangerous to the moor frog because they are prone to desiccation. Conservation efforts undertaken for the moor frog are most effective when executed in small scale phases. These small scale phases are more easily managed and receive more attention.
