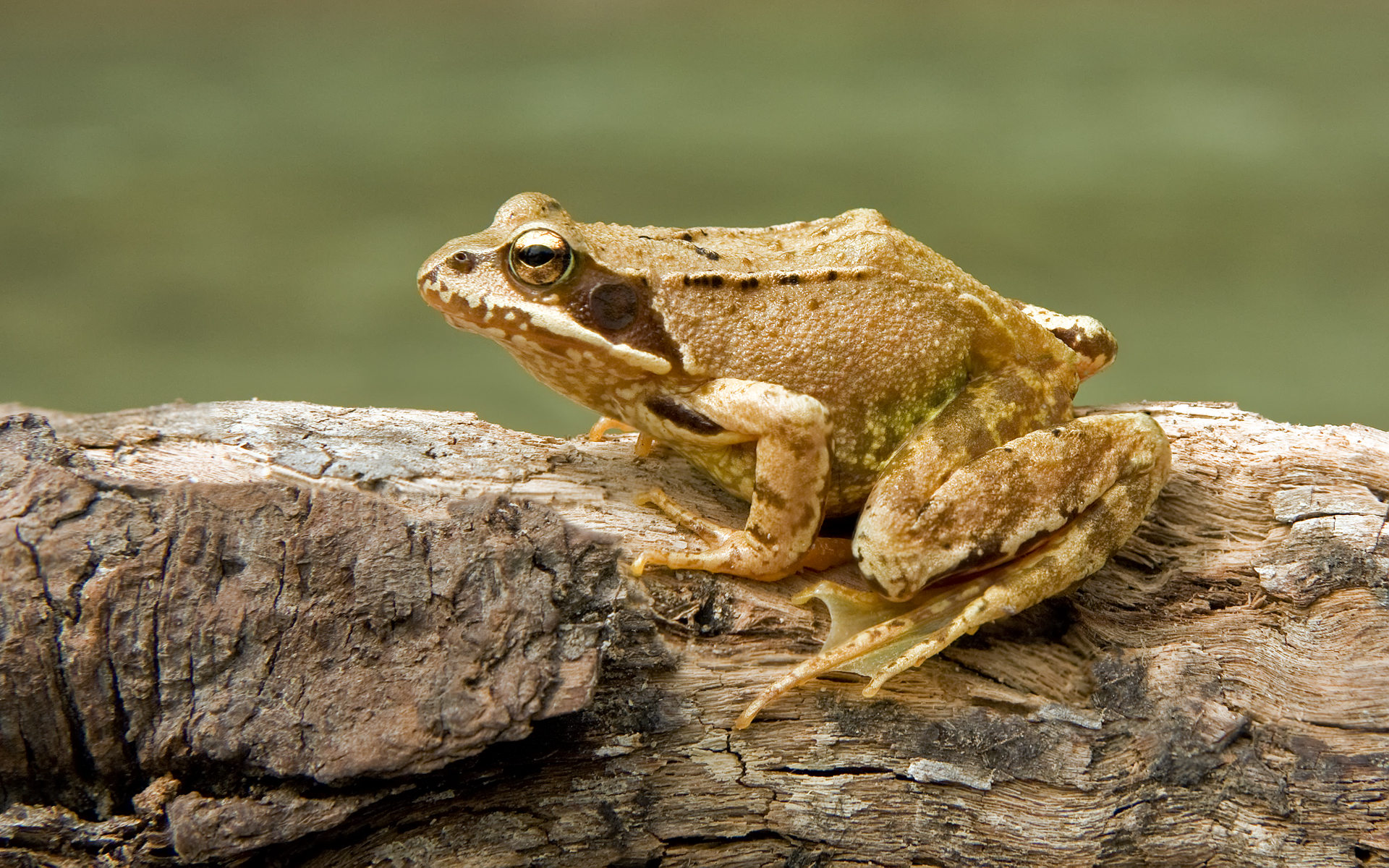

Conservation status
- Least Concern (IUCN 3.1)

Scientific classification
- Kingdom: Animalia
- Phylum: Chordata
- Class: Amphibia
- Order: Anura
- Family: Ranidae
- Genus: Rana
- Species: R. temporaria

Binomial name
- Rana temporaria Linnaeus, 1758

Subspecies
- R. t. temporaria; R. t. honnorati; R. t. parvipalmata
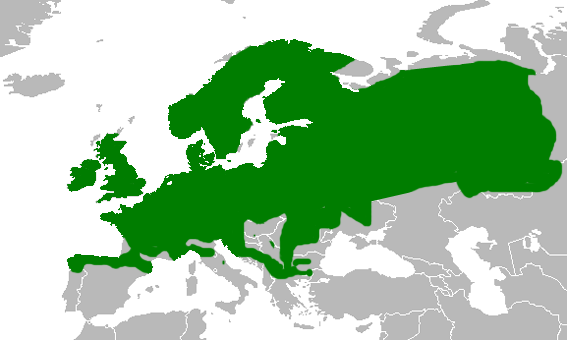
- Distribution of Rana temporaria in Europe

Audio

= Common frog =

Common frog Temporal range: Early Pleistocene–present

Species of amphibian

The common frog or grass frog (Rana temporaria), also known as the European common frog, European common brown frog, European grass frog, European Holarctic true frog, European pond frog, European brown frog, or simply the frog, is a semi-aquatic amphibian of the family Ranidae, found throughout much of Europe as far north as Scandinavia and as far east as the Urals, except for most of the Iberian Peninsula, southern Italy, and the southern Balkans. The farthest west it can be found is Ireland. It is also found in Asia, and eastward to Japan. The nominative, and most common, subspecies Rana temporaria temporaria is a largely terrestrial frog native to Europe. It is distributed throughout northern Europe and can be found from Ireland to as far east as Japan.

Common frogs undergo metamorphosis through three distinct life stages — aquatic larva, terrestrial juvenile, and adult. They have plump bodies with rounded snouts, webbed feet, and long hind legs adapted for swimming and hopping on land. They are often confused with the common toad (Bufo bufo), but can be easily distinguished by their longer legs, hopping movements, and moist skin; toads have shorter legs, crawl and have a dry 'warty' skin. The two species also lay their eggs differently, frogs lay their eggs in clumps, whereas toads lay theirs in long strings.

The common frog is very similar to its close relative the moor frog (Rana arvalis). Where both species occur together, the most reliable way to distinguish them is to look at their metatarsal tubercles, which are small spurs on the hind feet next to the innermost toe. In the common frog, this spur is soft and small, less than a third of the length of the innermost toe, whereas in the moor frog, it is hard and approximately half the length of the innermost toe. The two species also have different calls, and during the breeding season, moor frog males may turn blue, while common frog males at most get a faint blue tint.

There are 3 subspecies of the common frog, R. t. temporaria, R. t. honnorati and R. t. palvipalmata. R. t. temporaria is the most common subspecies of this frog.

== Description ==
The adult common frog has a body length of 6 to 9 centimetres (2.4 to 3.5 in). In addition, its back and flanks vary in colour from olive green to grey-brown, brown, olive brown, grey, yellowish and rufous. However, it can lighten and darken its skin to match its surroundings. Some individuals have more unusual colouration—both black and red individuals have been found in Scotland, and albino frogs have been found with yellow skin and red eyes. During the mating season the male common frog tends to turn greyish-blue (see video below). The average mass is 22.7 g (0.80 oz); the female is usually slightly larger than the male.

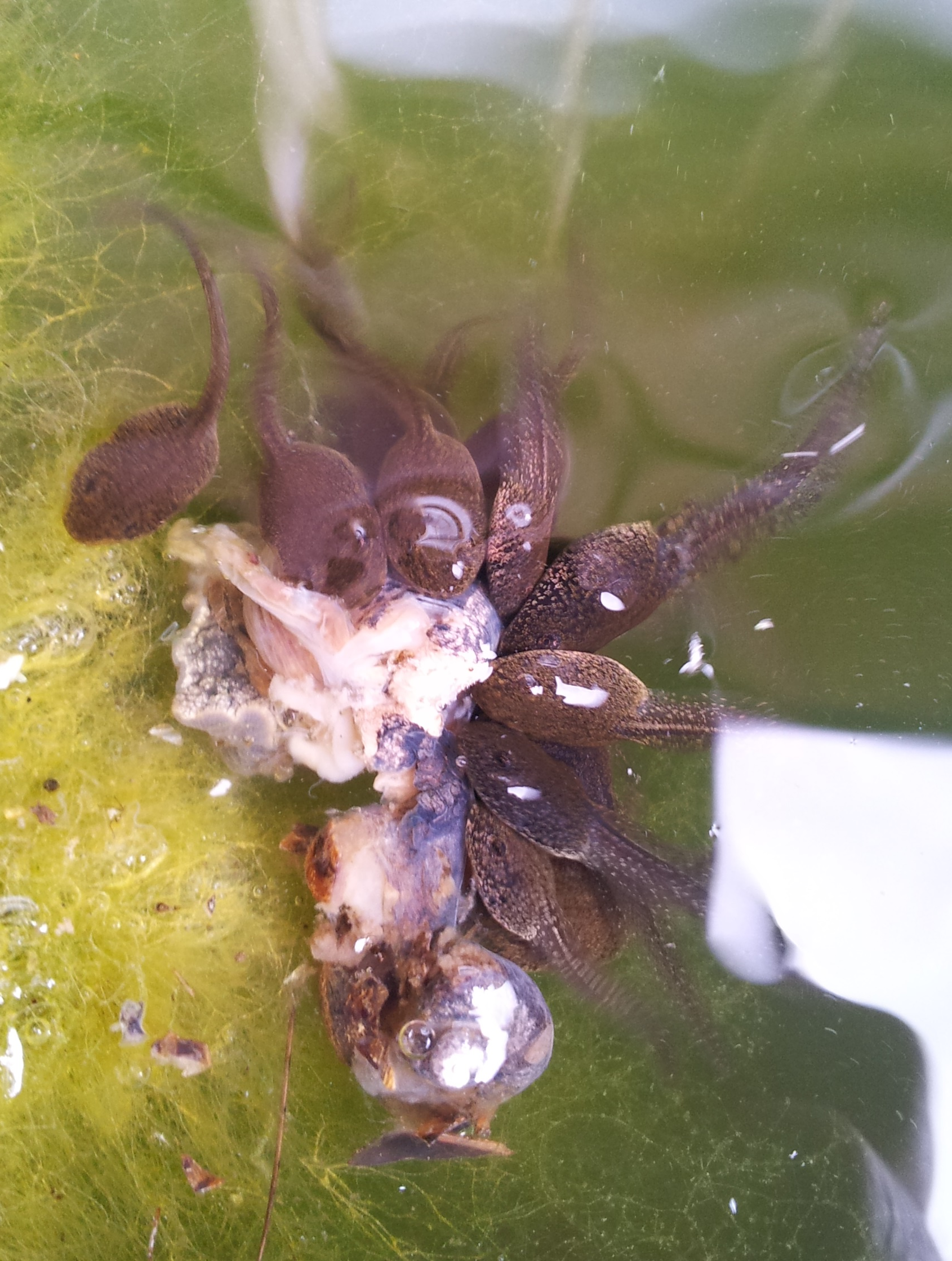
Captive common frog tadpoles eating a crushed garden snail

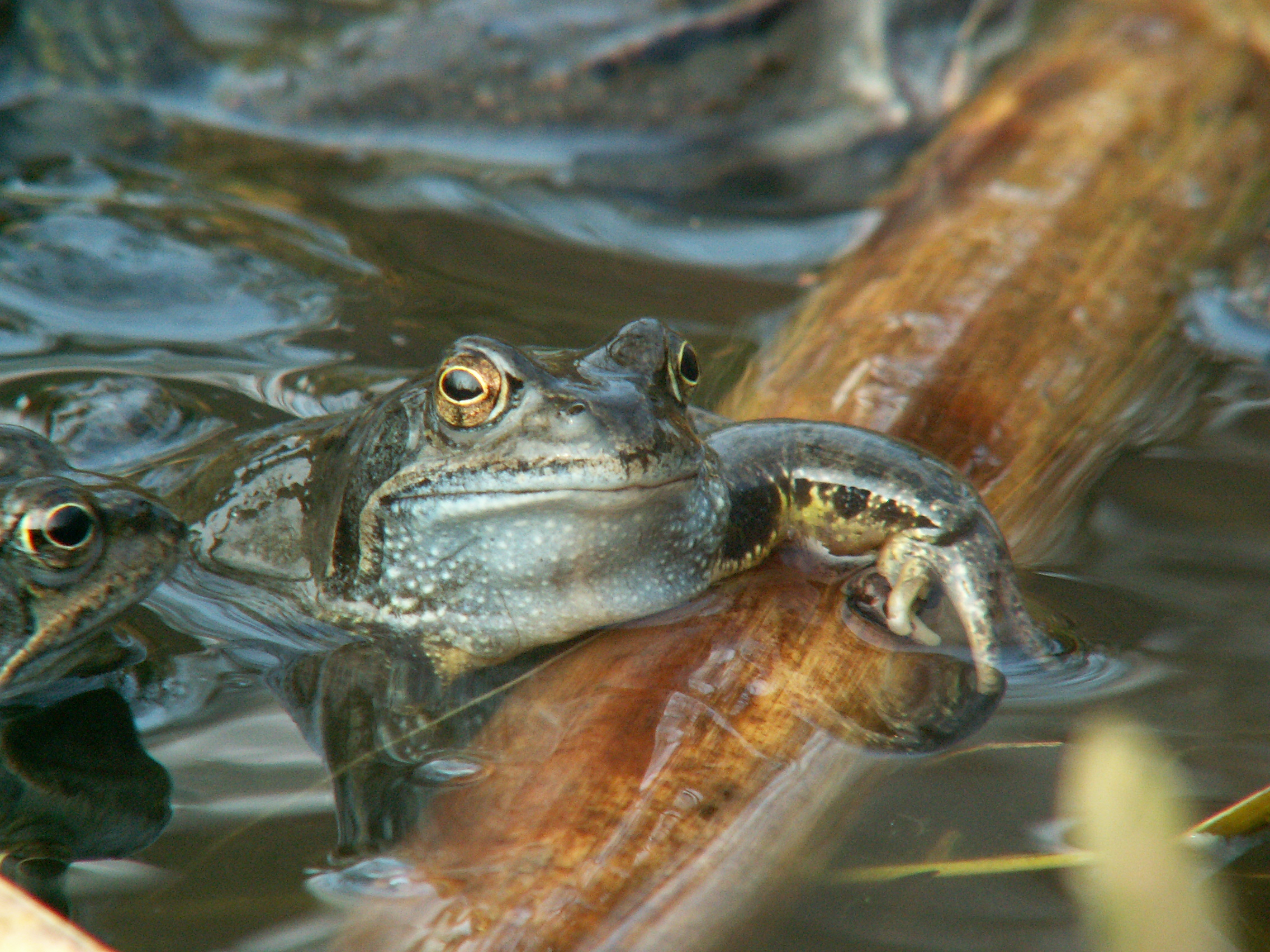
Male during breeding season showing the nuptial pad, white throat and a blue grey hue over the normal black and brown skin

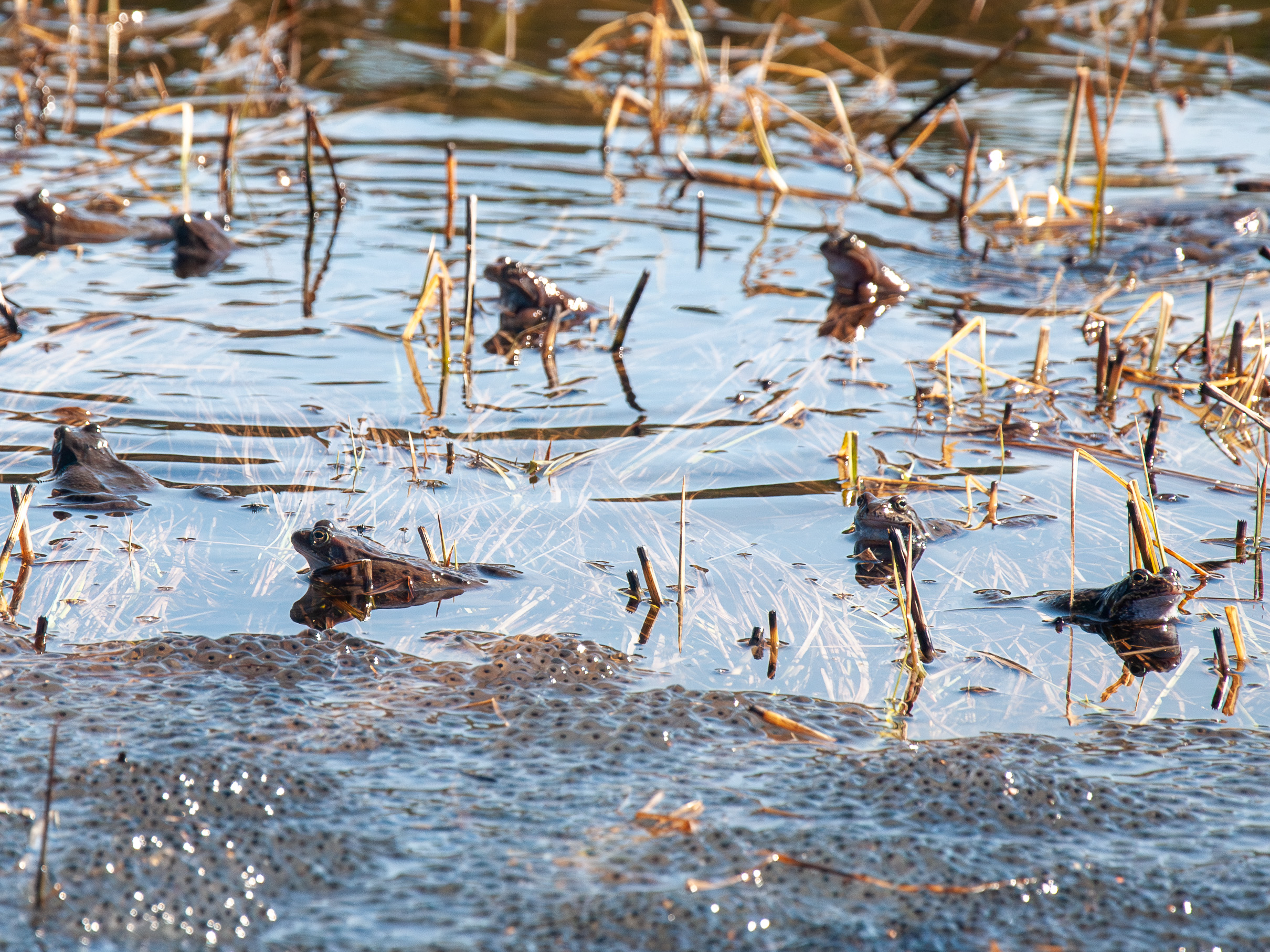
Common frog mass spawning event in the wild

The flanks, limbs and backs are covered with irregular dark blotches and they usually sport a chevron-shaped spot on the back of their neck and a dark spot behind the eye. Unlike other amphibians, common frogs generally lack a mid-dorsal band but, when they have one, it is comparatively faint. In many countries moor frogs have a light dorsal band which easily distinguishes them from common frogs. The underbelly is white or yellow (occasionally more orange in females) and can be speckled with brown or orange. The eyes are brown with transparent horizontal pupils, and they have transparent inner eyelids to protect the eyes while underwater, as well as a 'mask' which covers the eyes and eardrums. Although the common frog has long hind legs compared to the common toad, they are shorter than those of the agile frog with which it shares some of its range. The longer hind legs and fainter colouration of the agile frog are the main features that distinguish the two species.

Males can be distinguished from females by their smaller size and the hard swellings, known as nuptial pads, on the first digits of their forelimbs. These are used to grasp females during mating. During the mating season, the throats of males often turn white, and their overall colour is generally light grey, while females are browner or even red.

These smooth-skinned frogs can grow to an average weight of 22.7 grams and length of seven to ten centimetres (2.8-3.9 in) with colors varying from gray to green, brown, yellow, or red and may be covered in blotches. The underside is white or yellow, often with spots.

== Habitat and distribution ==
Outside the breeding season, common frogs live a solitary life in damp wetland niches near ponds or marshes or among long riparian grass. They are normally active for much of the year, only hibernating in the coldest months. In the most northern extremities of their range they may be trapped under ice for up to nine months of the year, but recent studies have shown that in these conditions they may be relatively active at temperatures close to freezing. In the British Isles, common frogs typically hibernate from late October to January. They will re-emerge as early as February if conditions are favorable, and migrate to bodies of water such as garden ponds to spawn. Where conditions are harsher, such as in the Alps, they emerge as late as early June. Common frogs hibernate in running waters, muddy burrows, or in layers of decaying leaves and mud at the bottom of ponds or lakes primarily with a current. The oxygen uptake through the skin suffices to sustain the needs of the cold and motionless frogs during hibernation.

Common frogs are found throughout much of Europe as far north as northern Scandinavia inside the Arctic Circle and as far east as the Urals, except for most of Iberia, southern Italy, and the southern Balkans. Other areas where the common frog has been introduced include the Isle of Lewis, Shetland, Orkney and the Faroe Islands. It is also found in Asia, and eastward to Japan.

The common frog has long been thought to be an entirely introduced species in Ireland, however, genetic analyses suggest that particular populations in the south west of Ireland are indeed indigenous to the country. The authors propose that the Irish frog population is a mixed group that includes native frogs that survived the last glacial period in ice free refugia, natural post-glacial colonizers and recent artificial introductions from Western Europe.

=== Genetic population structure ===
The common frog is a very widely distributed species, being common all throughout Europe and northwest Asia. The more peripheral subpopulations of common frogs are significantly less in number, as well as less genetically variable. There is a steep genetic decline when approaching the periphery of the common frog's distribution range. Additionally, genetic differentiation of common frog subpopulations tends to decrease in relation to increasing latitude. The colder climates create a strong selective pressure favoring common frog populations able to behaviorally thermoregulate at a high degree.

=== Fossil record ===
The common frog has a fossil record going back to at least the Early Pleistocene, being found at the Süttő 21 site in Hungary dating back to around the time of the Mid-Pleistocene Transition.

== Conservation ==
=== Long-term impact of diseases ===
Of the many diseases that affect common frogs, one of the most deadly is Ranavirus, which has been responsible for causing declines in amphibian populations worldwide. Two of the most important and deadly symptoms caused by ranavirus in common frogs are skin ulcerations and hemorrhaging. Mortality rates associated with the disease are very high, in some cases exceeding 90%. Deaths caused by ranavirus occur at all stages of the common frog's lifecycle and are concentrated mostly during the summer months. Overall, populations of common frog affected by ranavirus experience consistent and substantial declines in population size. Recent metagenomic studies of common frogs from the UK have revealed widespread viral infections with Rana tamanavirus, a positive-sense RNA virus that is closely related to Tamana bat virus, with no pathology or effects on life history traits observed to date.

=== Impact of urbanization ===
Due to the widespread nature of Rana temporaria, common frogs can make their homes in both urban and rural environments. However, many of the populations living in urban areas are subject to the detrimental effects of urbanisation. The construction of roads and buildings – absolute barriers to migration – has prevented gene flow and drift between urban populations of common frogs, resulting in lower levels of genetic diversity in urban populations of common frog compared to their rural counterparts. Urban common frog populations also experience higher levels of mortality and developmental abnormalities, indicating forced inbreeding.

However, the common frog is listed as a species of least concern on the IUCN Red List of Threatened Species.

== Diet ==
=== Juvenile ===
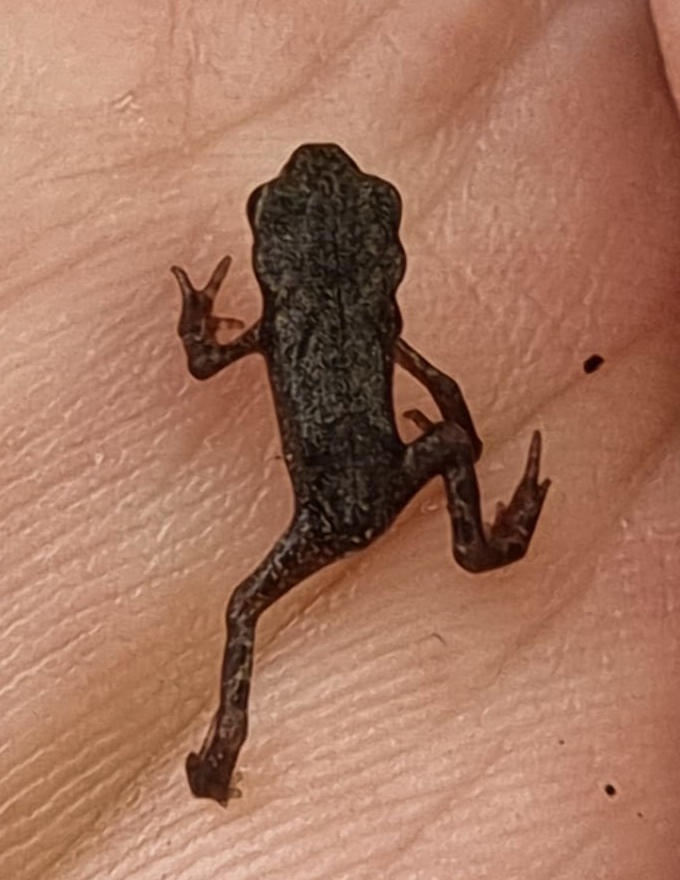
Common frog about one week after metamorphosis, 12 mm body length

During metamorphosis, when the tadpole's front legs have developed, the frog stops eating for a short time. Recently metamorphosed juveniles feed mainly on small arthropods such as Collembola (springtails), Acarina (mites and ticks), and small fly larvae. Rana temporaria tadpoles, however, mostly feed on algae and decomposed plants, but when their hind legs develop, they become carnivorous.

=== Adults ===
The common frog takes its place as an unspecialized and opportunistic feeder wherever it is found. In other words, common frogs will consume whatever prey that is most available and easy to catch. This usually means that the common frog feeds by remaining inactive and waiting for a suitable prey to enter the frog's area of capture. This also means that the common frog's diet changes according to the season when its prey is most abundant. In the summer, the common frog's diet mostly consists of adult crane flies and the larvae of butterflies and moths. To a slightly lesser extent, common frogs will feed on woodlice, arachnids, beetles, slugs, snails, and earthworms. In addition, common frogs will typically feed on bigger prey as they become larger. Therefore, newly developed common frogs are limited to smaller insect prey, whereas larger frogs are able to consume a wide range of insects. Common frogs will hide in damp places, such as in the water, during the day, and at night, they will begin searching for food.

== Reproduction and mating patterns ==
Choir of greyish males and a few brownish females still present in a small pond

During the spring the frog's pituitary gland is stimulated by changes in external factors, such as rainfall, day length and temperature, to produce hormones which, in turn, stimulate the production of sex cells – eggs in the females and sperm in the male. The male's nuptial pad also swells and becomes more heavily pigmented. Common frogs breed in shallow, still, fresh water such as ponds, with spawning commencing sometime between late February and late June, but generally in April over the main part of their range.

=== Competition among males ===
Like its close cousin, the moor frog (R. arvalis), R. Temporaria does not exhibit territoriality, resulting in a lack of physical fighting among males. During the breeding season, male common frogs undergo a period of a few days (less than 10 days) during which they display rapid and frenzied breeding behavior, during which the purpose of the male is to quickly find and mate with as many female frogs as possible. Males with higher mating success rates typically have longer thumbs than single males, which gives them a better grip on females.

=== Mating interactions ===
About three years after birth, the common frog will return to its original birthplace and emit a mating call. Males will be the first to arrive at the pond and wait for females to enter. During this period of pre-female competition, the pond becomes significantly male-dominated, and there is a substantial degree of intrasexual competition taking place. The shallower portion of the pond, which is more conducive to egg-laying, is more predominantly occupied by the larger males. However, once the females arrive, this territoriality quickly dissipates and male-female amplexed pairs are free to move anywhere in the pond. Additionally, once an amplexus is established, it is rare for single males to attempt to displace or "take over" the paired male.

It is also important to note the effect of size on the mating strategies of a male common frog. Smaller frogs are crowded out of the shallow areas of the pond during the pre-spawning period, a problem which they circumvent by searching for females on the land or in areas of the pond where they first arrive. Meanwhile, the larger frogs occupy the spawning site, where they encounter more amplexed pairs and therefore rely on their ability to displace amplexed males to secure a mate. However, the frequency of these takeovers is not consistent.

== Life cycle ==
Clutch sizes of female common frogs range from a few hundred to 5,000 eggs. Many of these eggs form large aggregations that serve to thermoregulate and protect the developing embryo from potential predators. The aggregation of eggs raises the temperature of the embryo relative to the surrounding water, which is important because the rate of tadpole development is faster at higher temperatures. Additionally, the eggs are typically laid in the shallower regions of the pond to prevent hypoxia-induced fatality of the embryos.

It usually takes 2–3 weeks for the eggs to hatch. After that, the frog larvae group together in schools, where they help each other to feed on algae and larger plants, and to avoid predators. By June and July, most tadpoles will have metamorphosized, and the remaining time until winter is used to feed and grow larger. Only the largest frogs will survive the winter, which places a large emphasis on rapid development until then. The development rate of the common frog correlates with temperature. In lower temperature regions, common frogs will hatch earlier and metamorphosize sooner than common frogs living in warmer climate regions. Sexual maturity occurs only after three years, and common frogs will typically live between six and eight years.

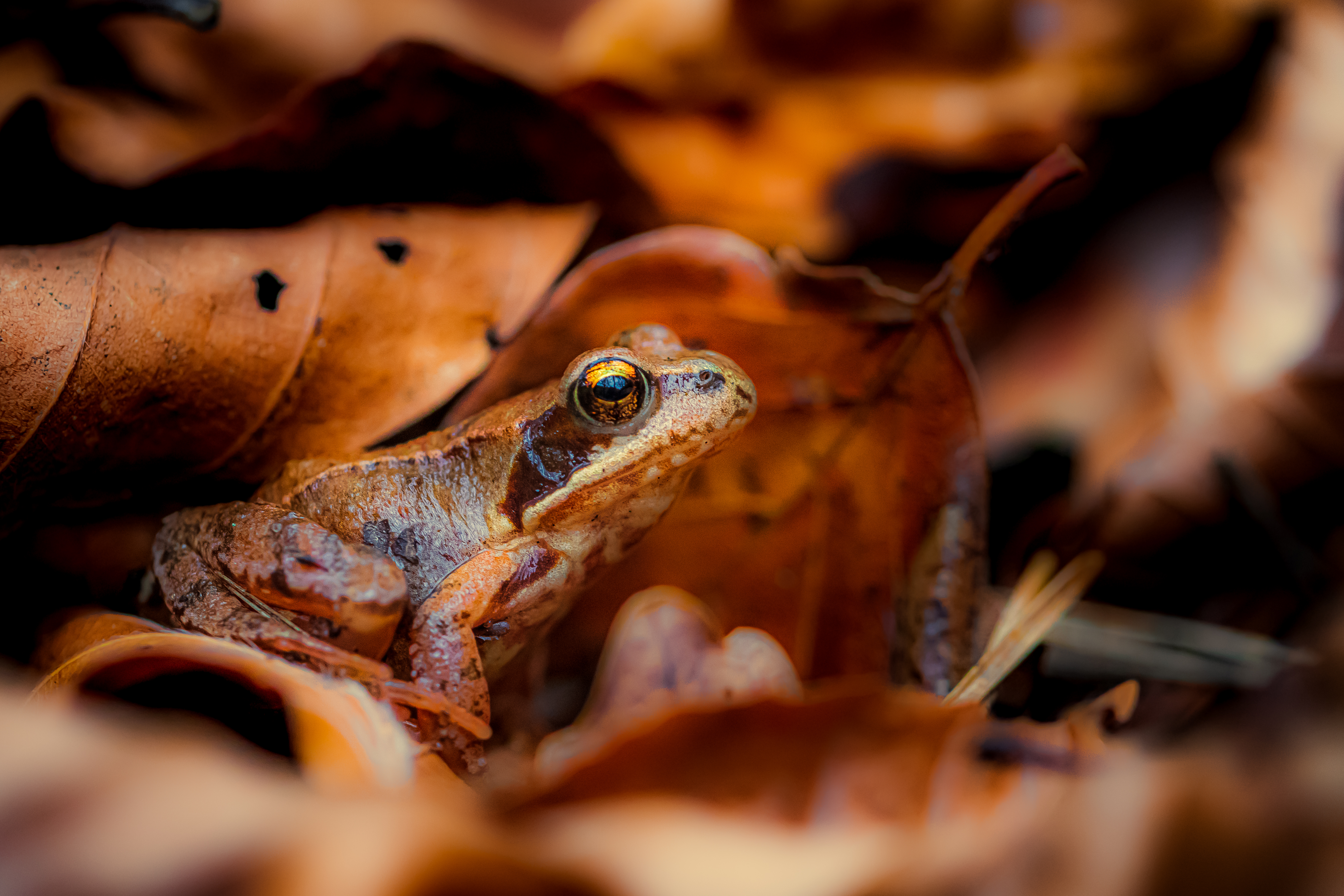
Common frog camouflaged in autumn leaves.

=== Development in the presence of predators ===
The presence of a predator in the early development of the tadpole affects its metamorphic traits. For example, it can lead to a longer larval period and a smaller size and mass at metamorphosis. Once the predator is removed, the growth rate of the tadpole returns to, or even exceeds, baseline. This influence of predator threat is only significant during early tadpole development.

One of the common frog's most pervasive predators is the red-eared slider (Trachemys scripta elegans), which is a very invasive species of turtle.

== Thermoregulation ==
As an ectotherm, the common frog is highly dependent on temperature as this directly affects its metabolism, development, reproduction, muscular strength, and respiration. As such, common frogs at medium and high elevations have developed a unique set of strategies to survive in cold climates. Due to these adaptations, the common frog's ability to thermoregulate has become so effective that the species has become widespread in a variety of environments and climates. The species has been found living as far north as the Arctic Circle in Scandinavia, which is further north than any other amphibian in the region. Contrary to Lithobates sylvaticus (wood frogs), common frogs do not have the ability to freeze protect themselves by increasing their levels of blood glucose to serve as a cryoprotectant. As a result, common frogs must rely on behavioral thermoregulation by seeking out warm microhabitats (such as in the soil or between rocks) during wintertime. In addition, common frogs often hibernate in groups during the winter season in order to maintain body heat.

== Social behavior ==
Similar to other anuran species (Anaxyrus americanus and Rana sylvatica), Rana temporaria are able to naturally discriminate others of its kind. Post-embryonic interaction with conspecifics is not necessary to induce associative behavior for common frogs as an adult. Rather, once common frog tadpoles have reached a certain age, they gain a strong innate associative tendency. Rana temporaria tend to aggregate as the result of environmental pressures, such as temperature or predators.

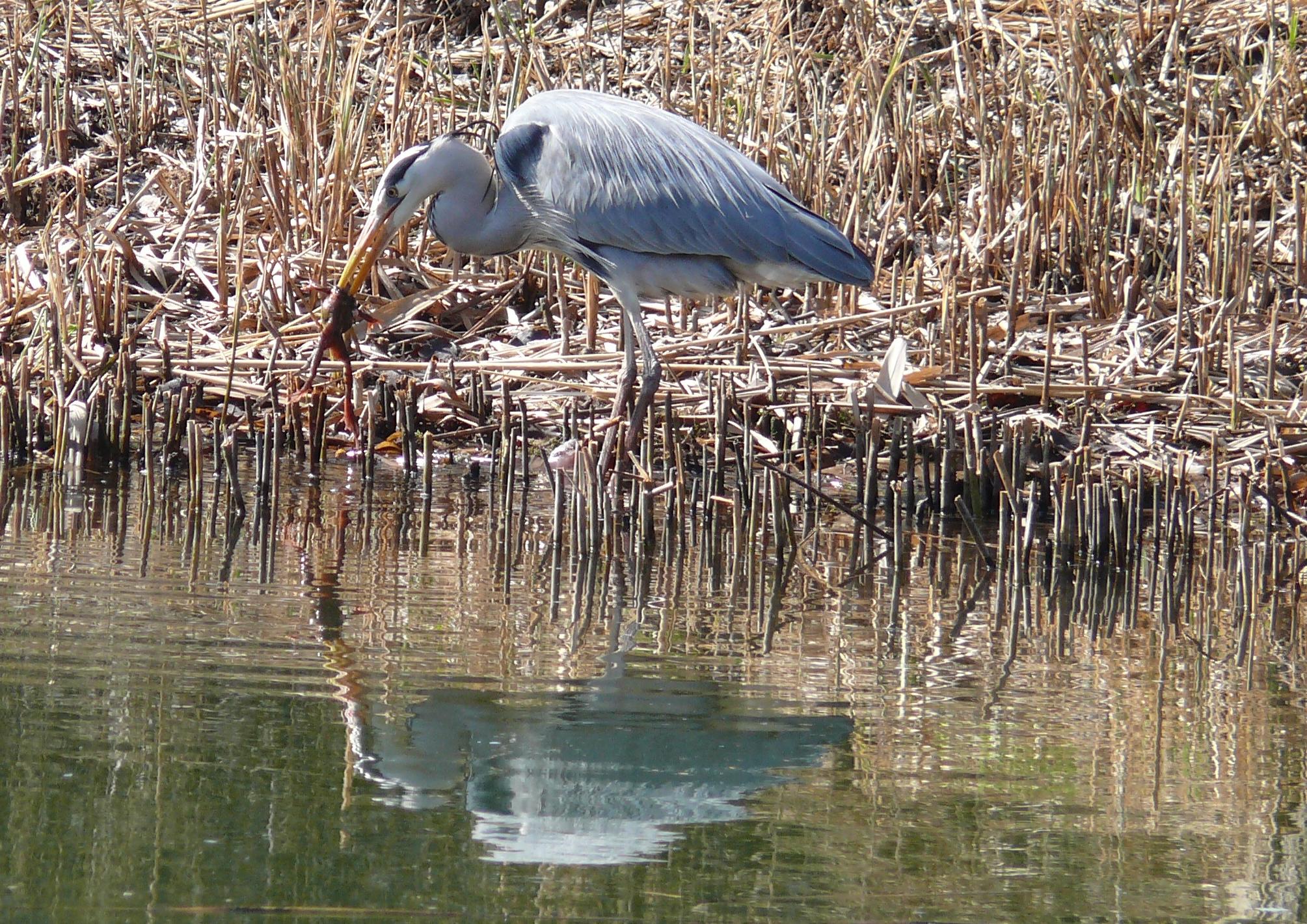
Grey heron feeding on a common frog

== Predators ==
Tadpoles are eaten by fish, diving beetles, dragonfly larvae and birds. Adult frogs have numerous predators including storks, birds of prey, crows, gulls, ducks, terns, herons, pine martens, stoats, weasels, polecats, badgers, otters and snakes. Some frogs are killed, but rarely eaten, by domestic cats, and large numbers are killed on the roads by motor vehicles.

== Interactions with humans and livestock ==
Common frogs have an important place in human ecology by controlling the insect populations. In particular, their consumption of mosquitos and other crop-damaging insects has been especially valuable. In addition, Rana temporaria, due to their ecological pervasiveness and relative abundance, have become a common laboratory specimen.

== Farming ==
R. temporaria are farmed. Miles et al. 2004 provide improved ingredients for manufacturers of pellet food for farmed common frogs.

Due to the spread of diseases such as ranavirus, the UK-based amphibian charity Froglife advised the public to avoid moving frogspawn, tadpoles or frogs from one pond to another, even if they are nearby. It has also been recommended not to place goldfish or exotic frog species in outdoor ponds as this could have a negative effect on the frog population.
