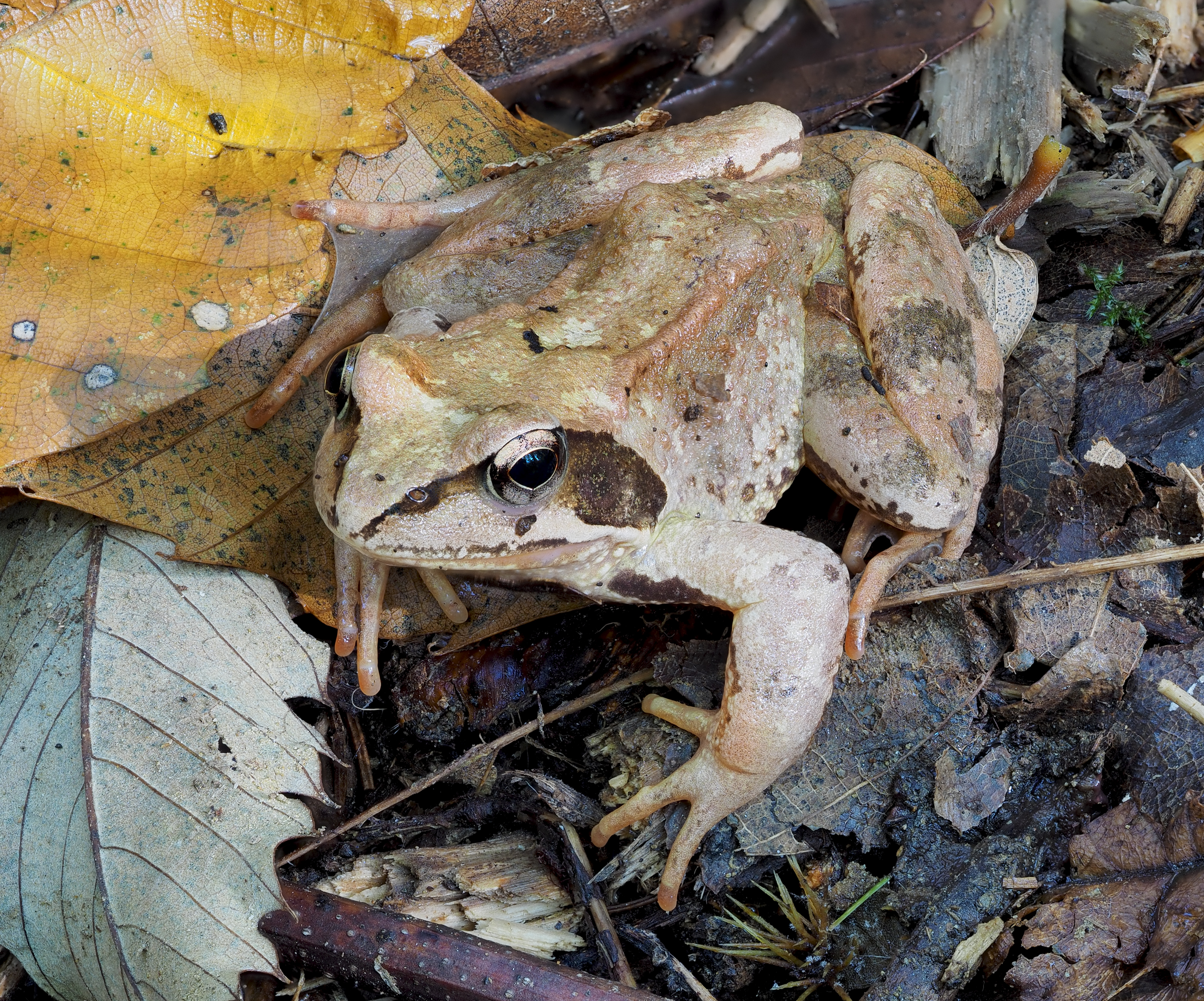

Conservation status
- Least Concern (IUCN 3.1)

Scientific classification
- Kingdom: Animalia
- Phylum: Chordata
- Class: Amphibia
- Order: Anura
- Family: Ranidae
- Genus: Rana
- Species: R. dalmatina

Binomial name
- Rana dalmatina Fitzinger in Bonaparte, 1839
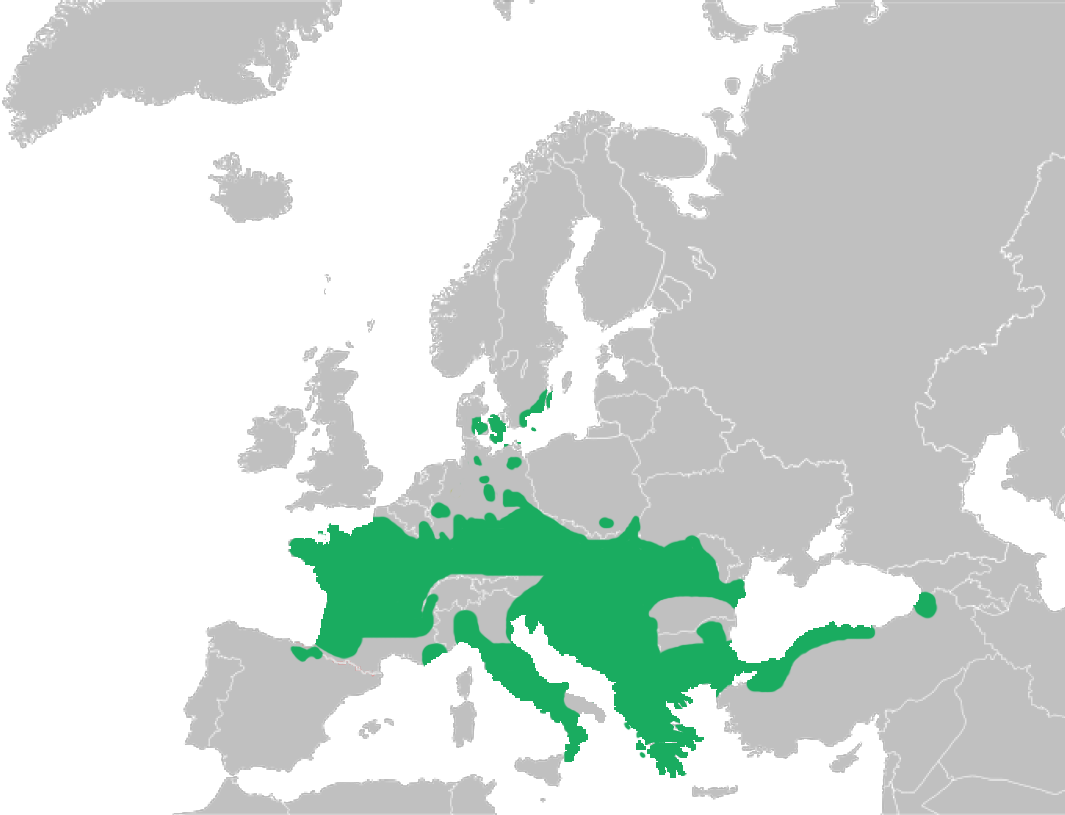
- Distribution (green)

Synonyms
- Rana agilis Thomas, 1855; Rana gracilis Fatio, 1862; Rana temporaria var. agilis Schreiber, 1875; Rana temporaria agilis Bedriaga, 1881; Rana agilis agilis Cope, 1886; Rana (Crotaphitis) agilis Schultze, 1891; Rana (Rana) dalmatina Guibé, 1950; Rana agiloides Brunner, 1951; Rana mülleri Brunner, 1959; Rana (Rana) dalmatina Dubois, 1987; Rana (Laurasiarana) dalmatina Hillis & Wilcox, 2005

= Agile frog =

Species of amphibian

The agile frog (Rana dalmatina) is a European frog in the genus Rana of the true frog family, Ranidae.

== Description ==
This species is fat and has long limbs and a pointy snout. Adult males are rarely larger than 6.5 cm, while females can grow up to 8 cm. Its dorsal surface is light brown, reddish-brown, or light greyish-brown with very little contrast. Triangle-shaped spots reach from the temple to the eardrum, which are dark brown. The underside of the agile frog is white without any spots. During mating season, the males often become dark brown.

The hind legs are unusually long, which allow this species to jump further than other similar frogs - they have been known to jump up to two metres in distance. The pupils are horizontal. The colour of the upper third of the iris (above the pupil) is lighter and gold in colouration. The tympanum is about the size of the diameter of the eye. The gland stripes on the frog's back are not very developed and partially interrupted.

== Reproduction ==
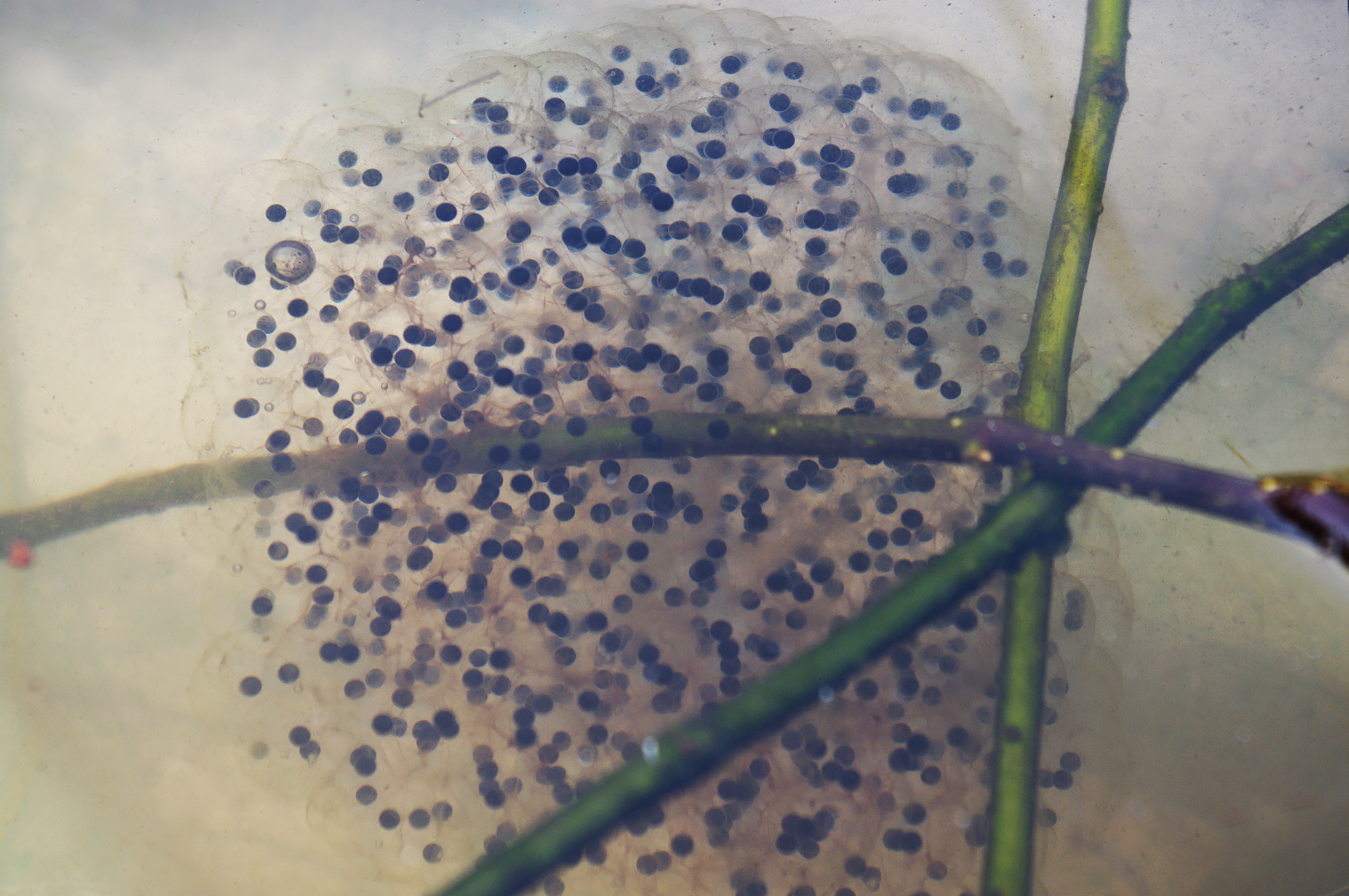
Typically fixed spawn clump under water

The call is a fairly quiet "rog ... rog ... rog", and can last for up to 12 seconds, and almost sounds like a clucking chicken. They often also call under water, so the calls can only be heard from a very short distance by observers. Spawning only lasts a few days, and during this period, the males sometimes gather in large calling groups on the water surface to attract females. In Central Europe, spawning usually occurs in the first 20 days of March, but can also be delayed, depending on the weather. The spawn clumps consist of 450 to 1800 eggs, and are usually attached to tree branches, roots, or plant stems at depths of 5–40 cm (2–16 in). Therefore, they rarely sink to the bottom. Unlike the moor frog (Rana arvalis) and common frog (Rana temporaria), the agile frog does not lay its spawn all in one clump. The diameter of a single egg, not counting the gelatinous shell, is 1.5–2.1 mm (0.06–0.08 in).

== Feeding ==
Adults of agile frog eat arthropods like caterpillars, spiders, millipedes, flies, beetles, cicadas and collembolans. Tadpoles eat plant material.

== Habitat ==
The agile frog prefers light deciduous mixed forests with plentiful water. The open land around a forest is often also populated, as long as it is connected to the forest by shrubs. In dry, warm forests, this species often also lives far away from the water. Of the three Middle European Rana species, this frog likes warmth and dryness the most.

== Distribution ==
The agile frog can be found in France, parts of Germany, Denmark, Sweden, Italy, Spain, Poland, the Czech Republic, Slovakia, Austria, Hungary, on the Balkans, Greece, and by the Black Sea.

== Status in the British Isles ==
The agile frog can also be found in the Channel Islands. While the species has gone extinct from Guernsey, it still survives on Jersey, due to crucial intervention from a range of partners, including Durrell Wildlife Conservation Trust. By the late 1980s, the species was very close to extirpation on the island, having been reduced down to just one site, following long-term habitat loss and then a pesticide spill in 1987. Spawn has been head started since then, at Jersey Zoo with young froglets reintroduced back to remaining habitat on Ouaisne Common, on the south-west of the island.

In addition, the species once lived on mainland Great Britain, at least until during Saxon times, with numerous archaeological remains recovered from a site near Gosberton, Lincolnshire. For this reason, the species is considered a 'lost native' by UK Government advisor, Natural England, in their 2010 "Lost Life Report" and other UK conservation organisations such as Amphibian and Reptile Conservation.

The species is on the Great British Red List and is assessed to be Critically Endangered.

The agile frog's extinction on mainland Britain is theorised to be due to a combination of severe deforestation throughout the Middle Ages to the Industrial Period (known as assarting), and the process of wood-banking; the drainage and enclosure of forests. These processes played out across several centuries throughout Europe and are reasons why the species has non-contiguous, scattered, relictual populations across Poland, Germany, Denmark, and Sweden. On the northern edge of the species range, it requires complex deciduous woodland of an open quality and grazed by cattle, in order for the exacting climatological requirements to be fostered so the species can spawn early and young frogs can mature. It is quite possible that the species clung on until around 1800 CE. Celtic Rewilding are working to reintroduce the species to the rewilding Westacre Estate in Norfolk.
