= John Morton (naturalist) =

English cleric, naturalist and Fellow of the Royal Society

John Morton (1671–1726) was an English cleric, naturalist and Fellow of the Royal Society. He published a Natural History of Northamptonshire.

== Life ==
He was the son of Godly Morton of Scremby, Lincolnshire, born there. He entered Oundle School in August 1686, at the age of 14. He matriculated at Emmanuel College, Cambridge in 1688, graduating B.A. in 1691. He took an ad eundem degree at the University of Oxford in 1694, and proceeded M.A. in 1695.

In 1701 Morton became curate of Great Oxendon, Northamptonshire, and in 1703 he was elected a fellow of the Royal Society. From about 1707 he was rector of Great Oxendon.

Morton built up a scholarly relationship by correspondence with Sir Hans Sloane over the years 1703 to c.1716. In London he associated with the botanist Adam Buddle.

Morton died on 18 July 1726, aged 55, and was buried at Great Oxendon. A monument, with an inscription to his memory, was erected there at the expense of Sir Hans Sloane.

== Works ==
In a letter to Richard Richardson of North Bierley, dated 9 November 1704, Morton wrote that acquaintance with John Ray "initiated me early in the search and study of plants". From Martin Lister's books he developed an interest in fossil shells; and he corresponded with John Woodward and Edward Lhwyd, as well as Sloane.

In the Philosophical Transactions for 1706 appeared "A Letter [...] containing a Relation of river and other Shells digg'd up, together with various Vegetable Bodies, in a bituminous marshy earth, near Mears-Ashby, in Northamptonshire". In this, and in later work, Morton adopted the views of Woodward on Noah's Flood and the vertical distribution of fossils according to density.

In 1712 Morton published The Natural History of Northamptonshire, with some account of the Antiquities. This book deals largely with "figured fossils", of which it contains some plates. Richard Pulteney praised the botanical part; but Peter Whalley in his History of Northamptonshire considered its transcripts from the Domesday survey deficient. "Figured stones" were rocks that appeared to resemble parts of organisms, a traditional and enigmatic class noted by collectors.

== Family ==
Morton married Susanna Courtman, daughter of John Courtman; they had a family of at least five sons and a daughter.
