= Dvorníky-Včeláre =

Municipality of Slovakia

Dvorníky-Včeláre Szádudvarnok-Méhész
- Municipality
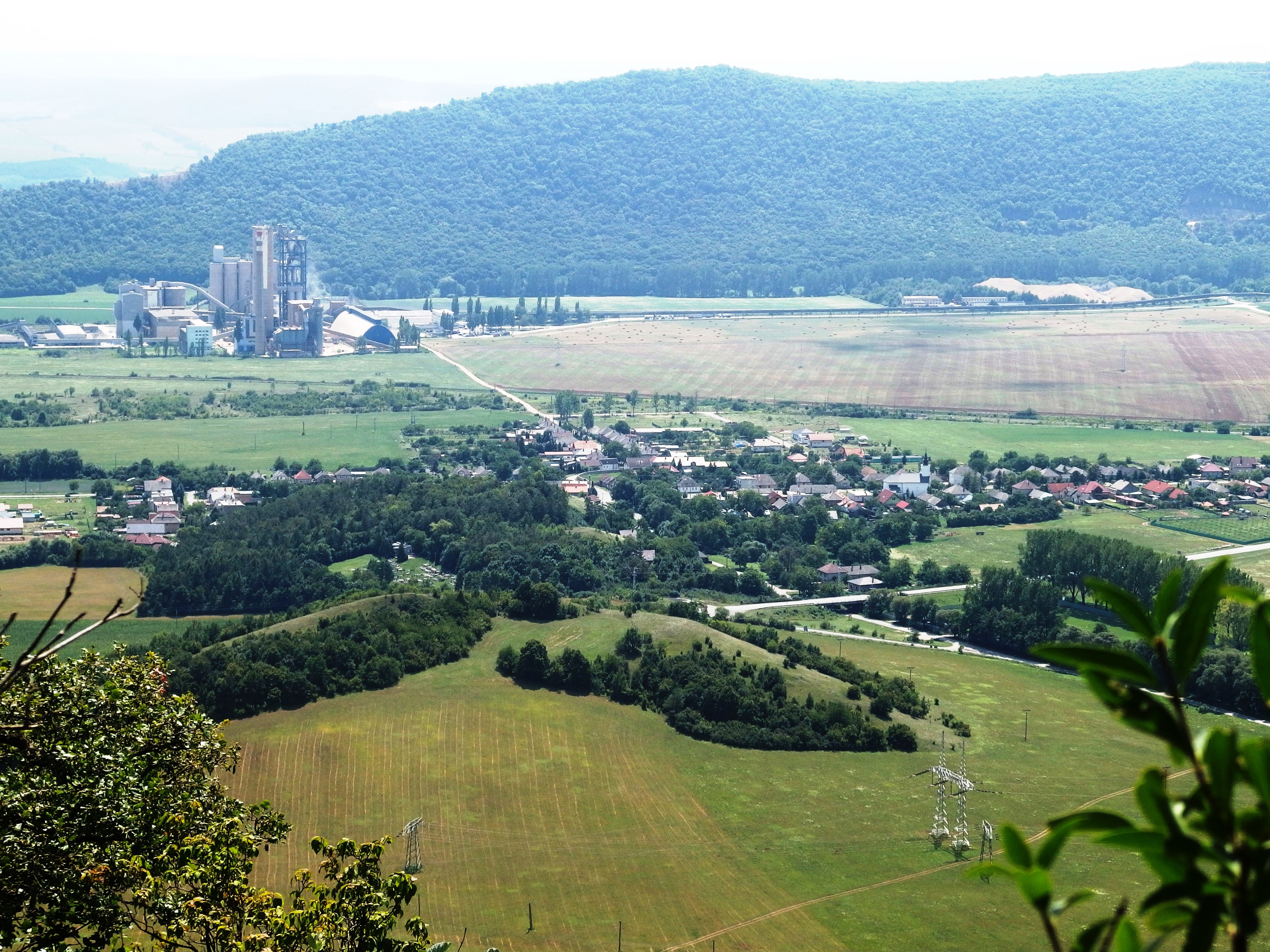

- Flag

- Location of Dvorníky-Včeláre in the Košice Region Location of Dvorníky-Včeláre in Slovakia
- Coordinates: 48.60°N 20.84°E
- Country: Slovakia
- Region: Košice Region
- District: Košice-okolie District
- First mentioned: 1437

Area
  - Total: 13.63 km^{2} (5.26 sq mi)
- Elevation: 204 m (669 ft)

Population (2025)
  - Total: 550
- Time zone: UTC+1 (CET)
  - Summer (DST): UTC+2 (CEST)
- Postal code: 440 2
- Area code: +421 55
- Vehicle registration plate (until 2022): KS
- Website: www.dvornikyvcelare.sk

Dvorníky-Včeláre (Hungarian: Szádudvarnok-Méhész) is a village and municipality in Košice-okolie District in the Kosice Region of eastern Slovakia.

== Geography ==
The municipality lies at an altitude of 204 metres (669 ft) and covers an area of 13.63 km^{2} (5.26 sq mi) (2025).

== Population ==
Population statistic (10 years)
Year	1995	2005	2015	2025
Count	429	430	480	550
Difference		+0.23%	+11.62%	+14.58%

Population statistic
Year	2024	2025
Count	543	550
Difference		+1.28%

It has a population of 550 people (31 December 2025).

=== Ethnicity ===
Census 2021 (1+ %)
Ethnicity	Number	Fraction
Hungarian	338	66.01%
Slovak	220	42.96%
Not found out	14	2.73%
Total	512	

In year 2021 was 512 people by ethnicity 338 as Hungarian, 220 as Slovak, 14 as Not found out, 4 as Romani, 2 as Other, 1 as Czech, 1 as Rusyn, 1 as Romanian and 1 as German.

Note on population: The difference values of population numbers in the table "Population statistic" and in the sections "Ethnicity" & "Religion" is caused by the use of various statistical methods.

=== Religion ===
Census 2021 (1+ %)
Religion	Number	Fraction
Roman Catholic Church	376	73.44%
Calvinist Church	57	11.13%
None	41	8.01%
Not found out	15	2.93%
Greek Catholic Church	8	1.56%
Evangelical Church	8	1.56%
Total	512	

In year 2021 was 512 people by religion 376 from Roman Catholic Church, 57 from Calvinist Church, 41 from None, 15 from Not found out, 8 from Greek Catholic Church, 8 from Evangelical Church, 2 from Jehovah's Witnesses, 2 from Christian Congregations in Slovakia, 1 from Eastern Orthodox Church, 1 from Other and not ascertained christian church and 1 from Buddhism.

== Genealogical resources ==
The records for genealogical research are available at the state archive "Statny Archiv in Kosice, Slovakia"

- Roman Catholic church records (births/marriages/deaths): 1711-1899 (parish B)
- Reformated church records (births/marriages/deaths): 1788-1902 (parish B)

== See also ==
- List of municipalities and towns in Slovakia
