= Blue chip =

Blue chip may refer to:

== Casino ==
- Blue gaming chip or casino token
- Blue Chip Casino, Hotel and Spa, riverboat located in Indiana

== Economy/finance ==
- Blue chip (stock market), a corporation with a national reputation for quality, reliability, and the ability to operate profitably
- Blue Chip Economic Indicators, a monthly publication with consensus forecasts of the US economy
- Blue chip hacking scandal, corruption of private investigators used by British "blue chip" companies
- Blue Chip Stamps, a trading stamps company

== Other ==
- Blue Chip (album), a 1989 album by Acoustic Alchemy
- Blue Chip Conference, a high school athletic conference in Indiana
- Blue Chip Electronics, a defunct American computer company
- Blue Chip series, the 1955-1959 GMC (automobile) versions of Chevrolet Task Force trucks
- Blue chip (sports), collegiate athletes who are targeted by professional sports teams
- Blue Chips, a 1994 film
- Bluechip (software), a voter database once used by the British Conservative Party
- BlueChip Stadium, a former name for ASB Baypark Stadium in Mount Maunganui, New Zealand
- The Blue Chip City, nickname for Cincinnati, Ohio
- Blue Chip (pinball), a pinball produced by Williams in 1976

== See also ==
- Blue Chips 7000, a 2017 album by Action Bronson
  - Blue Chips 2, a 2013 mixtape by Action Bronson
