= Petushki =

Petushki (Russian: Петушки) is the name of several inhabited localities in Russia.

Urban localities

- Petushki, Vladimir Oblast, a town in Petushinsky District of Vladimir Oblast

Rural localities

- Petushki, Ivanovo Oblast, a village in Yuzhsky District of Ivanovo Oblast
- Petushki, Kaluga Oblast, a village in Mosalsky District of Kaluga Oblast
- Petushki, Istrinsky District, Moscow Oblast, a village in Luchinskoye Rural Settlement of Istrinsky District of Moscow Oblast
- Petushki, Pushkinsky District, Moscow Oblast, a village in Yeldiginskoye Rural Settlement of Pushkinsky District of Moscow Oblast
- Petushki, Oryol Oblast, a selo in Petushensky Selsoviet of Novosilsky District of Oryol Oblast
- Petushki, Perm Krai, a village in Permsky District of Perm Krai
- Petushki, Sakha Republic, a selo under the administrative jurisdiction of the Settlement of Chersky, Nizhnekolymsky District, Sakha Republic
- Petushki, Smolensk Oblast, a village in Samuylovskoye Rural Settlement of Gagarinsky District of Smolensk Oblast
