= Krestovy =

Krestovy (Russian: Крестовый; masculine), Krestovaya (Крестовая; feminine), or Krestovoye (Крестовое; neuter) is the name of several rural localities in Russia.

== Modern localities ==
- Krestovoye, a khutor in Belgorodsky District of Belgorod Oblast
- Krestovaya, Novgorod Oblast, a village in Yazhelbitskoye Settlement of Valdaysky District in Novgorod Oblast
- Krestovaya, Sakha Republic, a selo in Pokhodsky Rural Okrug of Nizhnekolymsky District in the Sakha Republic
- Krestovaya, Smolensk Oblast, a village in Rukhanskoye Rural Settlement of Yershichsky District in Smolensk Oblast
- Krestovaya, Vologda Oblast, a village in Baranovsky Selsoviet of Kaduysky District in Vologda Oblast

== Abolished localities ==
- Krestovy (rural locality), a khutor in Sarpinsky Selsoviet under the administrative jurisdiction of Krasnoarmeysky City District under the administrative jurisdiction of the city of oblast significance of Volgograd in Volgograd Oblast; abolished in March 2010

== Alternative names ==
- Krestovaya, alternative name of Krestovka, a village in Okunev Nos selo Administrative Territory of Ust-Tsilemsky District in the Komi Republic; 66°22′N 52°31′E

== See also ==
- Krestovsky (disambiguation)
