= Nizhnekolymsk =

Nizhnekolymsk Нижнеколымск
- Selo
- Interactive map of Nizhnekolymsk
- Location of Nizhnekolymsk Nizhnekolymsk (Sakha Republic)
- Coordinates: 68°32′N 160°56′E
- Country: Russia
- Federal subject: Sakha Republic
- Administrative district: Nizhnekolymsky District
- Rural okrugSelsoviet: Pokhodsky Rural Okrug
- Founded: 1644
- Elevation: 539 m (1,768 ft)

Population (2010 Census)
  - Total: 6
  - Estimate (2021): 4 (−33.3%)

Municipal status
  - Municipal district: Nizhnekolymsky Municipal District
  - Rural settlement: Pokhodsky Rural Settlement
  - Capital of: Pokhodsky Rural Settlement
- Time zone: UTC+11 (MSK+8)
- Postal code: 678831
- OKTMO ID: 98637424131

Nizhnekolymsk (Russian: Нижнеколы́мск) is a rural locality (a selo) in Pokhodsky Rural Okrug of Nizhnekolymsky District in the Sakha Republic, Russia, located within the Arctic Circle near the East Siberian Sea on the left bank of the Kolyma River near its confluence with the Anyuy, 80 kilometers (50 mi) from Chersky, the administrative center of the district, and 35 kilometers (22 mi) from Pokhodsk, the administrative center of the rural okrug. Its population as of the 2010 Census was 6, of whom 4 were male and 2 female, up from 0 recorded during the 2002 Census.

== History ==
It was founded as a fort on the Kolyma River in 1644. The town was the starting point for the polar expedition of Ferdinand von Wrangel and Pyotr Anjou in 1820. On May 20, 1931, Nizhnekolymsk became the administrative center of Nizhnekolymsky District, but in 1942, due to constant flooding, the administrative center was transferred to Nizhniye Kresty. Nizhekolymsk had mostly been abandoned by 1968, although a small number of people continued to reside there.

== Notable people ==
- Alexander Penn (1906–1972), Israeli poet, born in Nizhnekolymsk

== In fiction ==
Red Pawn, a 1932 screen play by Ayn Rand, takes place in the vicinity of Nizhnekolymsk, during the early years of the Soviet Union.

== See also ==
- Srednekolymsk
- Verkhnekolymsk
