= Kolymsky =

Kolymsky (Russian: Колымский; masculine), Kolymskaya (Колымская; feminine), or Kolymskoye (Колымское; neuter) is the name of several rural localities in Russia:

- Kolymskoye, Magadan Oblast, a selo in Srednekansky District of Magadan Oblast
- Kolymskoye, Sakha Republic, a selo in Khalarchinsky Rural Okrug of Nizhnekolymsky District in the Sakha Republic

== See also ==
- Kolymsky Heights
