= Ambarchik =

Ambarchik Амбарчик
- Selo
- Interactive map of Ambarchik
- Location of Ambarchik Ambarchik (Sakha Republic)
- Coordinates: 69°37′34″N 162°18′14″E
- Country: Russia
- Federal subject: Sakha Republic
- Administrative district: Nizhnekolymsky District
- Rural okrugSelsoviet: Pokhodsky Rural Okrug
- Founded: 1740
- Elevation: 1 m (3.3 ft)

Population (2010 Census)
  - Total: 4
  - Estimate (2021): 0 (−100%)

Municipal status
  - Municipal district: Nizhnekolymsky Municipal District
  - Rural settlement: Pokhodsky Rural Settlement
- Time zone: UTC+11 (MSK+8)
- Postal code: 678822
- OKTMO ID: 98637424106

Ambarchik (Russian: Амба́рчик) is a rural locality (a selo) and a port in Pokhodsky Rural Okrug of Nizhnekolymsky District of the Sakha Republic, Russia, located 110 kilometers (68 mi) from Chersky, the administrative center of the district and 50 kilometers (31 mi) from Pokhodsk. It is located on the shores of Ambarchik Bay, part of the East Siberian Sea in the Arctic Ocean. The Kolyma River empties into the bay. Its population as of the 2010 Census was 4, of whom 2 were male and 2 female, up from 0 recorded during the 2002 Census.

== History ==
There had been a lighthouse marking Ambarchik Bay for several centuries and it is now an historic monument. However, there used to be a few barns and other buildings present in the middle of the eighteenth century when Dmitry Laptev stayed in the village when scouting the coastline from the mouth of the Lena River to Cape Bolshoy Baranov.

The importance of the settlement changed in the 1930s when it became a site of a Soviet forced labor camp. As part of Dalstroy the settlement acted as a transit camp for political and criminal exiles before they were moved to various camps along the Kolyma region. The remnants of this system can still be seen in the surrounds of the settlement where the ruins of warehouses, barracks, and cells are to be found along with hundreds of yards of barbed wire surrounding the area. The prisoners awaiting dispersal here built the current port infrastructure, starting in 1932.

As well as being a transit camp for the GULAG system, when construction began on the facilities for processing and transporting exiles, a polar research and meteorological station was also constructed in the village, beginning in 1935. The village would then play a supporting role in the Russian exploration of the Arctic.

Ambarchik came under fire during World War II when it was attacked by German forces as part of Operation Wunderland. The local population only just had time to arm themselves as German troops attempted to disembark from a submarine, the shallow waters surrounding the port preventing enemy vessels approaching too closely.

Formerly the main port on the East Siberian Sea, it was navigable only during August and September. As a result of the shallow waters mentioned above, the usefulness of the settlement as a port was limited and shipping was gradually transferred to Chersky in the lower reaches of the Kolyma to accommodate larger vessels. As a result of this economic transfer, the port and settlement has been all but abandoned.

== See also ==
- SS Dzhurma § Alleged 1933–34 incident
