= Yermolovo =

Yermolovo (Russian: Ермолово) is the name of several rural localities in Russia.

== Modern localities ==
- Yermolovo, Ivanovo Oblast, a village in Yuryevetsky District of Ivanovo Oblast
- Yermolovo, Kaluga Oblast, a village in Sukhinichsky District of Kaluga Oblast
- Yermolovo, Lipetsk Oblast, a village in Gryzlovsky Selsoviet of Dolgorukovsky District in Lipetsk Oblast; 52°29′N 38°9′E
- Yermolovo, Moscow Oblast, a village in Stremilovskoye Rural Settlement of Chekhovsky District in Moscow Oblast; 55°6′N 37°20′E
- Yermolovo, Kunyinsky District, Pskov Oblast, a village in Kunyinsky District of Pskov Oblast
- Yermolovo, Opochetsky District, Pskov Oblast, a village in Opochetsky District of Pskov Oblast
- Yermolovo, Pustoshkinsky District, Pskov Oblast, a village in Pustoshkinsky District of Pskov Oblast
- Yermolovo, Kasimovsky District, Ryazan Oblast, a selo in Yermolovsky Rural Okrug of Kasimovsky District in Ryazan Oblast
- Yermolovo, Skopinsky District, Ryazan Oblast, a selo in Yermolovsky Rural Okrug of Skopinsky District in Ryazan Oblast
- Yermolovo, Sakha Republic, a selo in Pokhodsky Rural Okrug of Nizhnekolymsky District in the Sakha Republic
- Yermolovo, Novlensky Selsoviet, Vologodsky District, Vologda Oblast, a village in Novlensky Selsoviet of Vologodsky District in Vologda Oblast
- Yermolovo, Raboche-Krestyansky Selsoviet, Vologodsky District, Vologda Oblast, a village in Raboche-Krestyansky Selsoviet of Vologodsky District in Vologda Oblast
- Yermolovo, Vysokovsky Selsoviet, Vologodsky District, Vologda Oblast, a village in Vysokovsky Selsoviet of Vologodsky District in Vologda Oblast
- Yermolovo, Tutayevsky District, Yaroslavl Oblast, a village in Rodionovsky Rural Okrug of Tutayevsky District in Yaroslavl Oblast
- Yermolovo, Uglichsky District, Yaroslavl Oblast, a village in Slobodskoy Rural Okrug of Uglichsky District in Yaroslavl Oblast
- Yermolovo, Yaroslavsky District, Yaroslavl Oblast, a village in Pestretsovsky Rural Okrug of Yaroslavsky District in Yaroslavl Oblast

== Alternative names ==
- Yermolovo, alternative name of Yermolino, a selo under the administrative jurisdiction of the Town of Vidnoye in Leninsky District of Moscow Oblast; 55°32′N 37°43′E
