= Lake Bolshoye Morskoye =

Lake in Yakutia, Russia

Bolshoye Morskoye
- Большое Морское озеро (Майнычин Анкаватын)
- Bolshoye Morskoye lake in 2020

- Location in the Sakha Republic, Russian Far East
- Location: Kolyma Lowland
- Coordinates: 70°04′N 158°44′E
- Primary outflows: Ankavaam
- Catchment area: 382 square kilometres (147 mi^{2})
- Basin countries: Russia
- Max. length: 17.5 km (10.9 mi)
- Max. width: 15 km (9.3 mi)
- Surface area: 205 square kilometres (79 mi^{2})
- Frozen: September to June
- Islands: None

Bolshoye Morskoye or Mainychin Ankavatyn (Russian: Большое Морское озеро; Chukot: Майнычин-Анкаватын, Maynıçın-Ankavatın) is a freshwater lake in the Sakha Republic (Yakutia), Russia.

Lying in the tundra of northeastern Yakutia, it is the fourth largest lake in the republic. The nearest inhabited place is Pokhodsk, Lower Kolyma District, located about 130 km (81 mi) to the southeast in a straight line. A 38,200 ha (94,000 acres) sector of the lake and its surroundings is a protected area.

== Geography ==
Bolshoye Morskoye, meaning "Big Sea", lies way north of the Arctic Circle, in the northern part of the Kolyma Lowland. The lake has a roughly oval shape and is located in a vast, flat area of lakes bound by the East Siberian Sea shores to the north and to the east. It belongs to the basin of the Bolshaya Chukochya river, which flows close to the lake to the south. The main outflowing river is the 67 km (42 mi) long Ankavaam (Morskaya), a left tributary of the Bolshaya Chukochya. The depth of Bolshoye Morskoye has not been measured. The lake is fed by snow and rain, with a predominance of snow. It begins to freeze in late September and stays under ice until early June. In cold years it may not thaw completely during the summer season.

Lake Ilirgytkin, another of the large lakes of the region, lies 40 km (25 mi) to the north of the northern shore of Bolshoye Morskoye, and smaller lake Maloye Morskoye is located close to the south, separated from its large neighbor by a 3 km (1.9 mi) wide land strip.

== Flora and fauna ==
The Bolshoye Morskoye lake lies in an area of permafrost and wetlands. Its shores are low, slightly indented, and covered with moss, lichen and low herbaceous vegetation. Reindeer are found in the area. The lake is rich in fish. Among the migratory bird species found in the lake in summer, the tundra swan, brent goose, black-billed capercaillie, peregrine falcon, loon and snow goose deserve mention.

== See also ==
- List of lakes of Russia
