= Dve Viski =

Rural locality in Sakha Republic, Russia

Dve Viski Две виски
- Selo
- Interactive map of Dve Viski
- Location of Dve Viski Dve Viski (Sakha Republic)
- Coordinates: 68°23′19″N 160°53′28″E
- Country: Russia
- Federal subject: Sakha Republic
- Administrative district: Nizhnekolymsky District
- Rural okrugSelsoviet: Pokhodsky Rural Okrug
- Elevation: 7 m (23 ft)

Population (2010 Census)
  - Total: 0
  - Estimate (2021): 0 )

Municipal status
  - Municipal district: Nizhnekolymsky Municipal District
  - Rural settlement: Pokhodsky Rural Settlement
- Time zone: UTC+11 (MSK+8)
- Postal code: 678822
- OKTMO ID: 98637424111

Dve Viski (Russian: Две виски) is a rural locality (a selo) in Pokhodsky Rural Okrug of Nizhnekolymsky District in the Sakha Republic, Russia, located 105 kilometers (65 mi) from Chersky, the administrative center of the district and 60 kilometers (37 mi) from Pokhodsk. Its population as of the 2010 Census was 0, the same as recorded during the 2002 Census. The name Viski means channel in Yakut, and has nothing to do with Whisky (Виски in Russian).
