= Andryushkino =

Andryushkino Андрюшкино Андрюшкино (Sakha)
- Selo
- Interactive map of Andryushkino
- Location of Andryushkino Andryushkino (Sakha Republic)
- Coordinates: 69°11′00″N 154°28′00″E
- Country: Russia
- Federal subject: Sakha Republic
- Administrative district: Nizhnekolymsky District
- Rural okrugSelsoviet: Rural National Yukagir Settlement of "Olerinsky Suktul"
- Founded: 1940

Population (2010 Census)
  - Total: 741
  - Estimate (2021): 741 (0%)

Administrative status
  - Capital of: Rural National Yukagir Settlement of "Olerinsky Suktul"

Municipal status
  - Municipal district: Nizhnekolymsky Municipal District
  - Rural settlement: Rural National Yukagir Settlement of "Olerinsky Suktul"
  - Capital of: Rural National Yukagir Settlement of "Olerinsky Suktul"
- Time zone: UTC+11 (MSK+8)
- Postal code: 678837
- OKTMO ID: 98637411101

Andryushkino (Russian: Андрюшкино; Yakut: Андрюшкино) is a rural locality (a selo), the only inhabited settlement and the administrative center of Rural National Yukagir Settlement of "Olerinsky Suktul" of Nizhnekolymsky District in the Sakha Republic, Russia, located 450 kilometers (280 mi) from Chersky, the administrative center of the district. Its population as of the 2010 Census was 741, of whom 369 were male and 372 female, down from 845 recorded during the 2002 Census.

== Geography ==
Andryushkino is located on the right bank of the Alazeya, 70 kilometers (43 mi) to the SSE of the eastern end of the Suor Uyata range and 60 kilometers (37 mi) to the SSW of Kisilyakh-Tas mountain.

Andryushkino is considered an inaccessible place, for it has no regular communication with the outside world. In winter it can be reached by winter road, but in summer only via the river or by helicopter. The nearest settlement is Chersky, located 450 kilometers (280 mi) away to the southeast, also in the Lower Kolyma District.
