= Suor Uyata =

Mountain range in the Sakha Republic, Far Eastern Federal District, Russia

- Суор-Уята / Суор Уйата
- Location within Sakha Republic

Highest point
- Peak: Salyr-Tas
- Elevation: 512 m (1,680 ft)

Dimensions
- Length: 60 km (37 mi) WNW/ESE
- Width: 12 km (7.5 mi) ENE/WSW

Geography
- Country: Russia
- Federal subject: Sakha Republic
- Range coordinates: 70°0′N 152°45′E
- Parent range: East Siberian System

Geology
- Rock age: Devonian
- Rock type(s): Granite, sandstone

Climbing
- Easiest route: From Andryushkino

The Suor Uyata (Russian: Суор-Уята; Yakut: Суор Уйата) is a mountain ridge in the Sakha Republic, Far Eastern Federal District, Russia. The village of Andryushkino, a small inhabited locality of the Lower Kolyma District, is located 70 kilometers (43 mi) to the SSE.

Kigilyakhs, rock formations that are an important element of the culture of the Yakuts, are found in the Suor Uyata ridge. 40 kilometers (25 mi) to the ESE of the eastern end of the range, on the right bank of the Alazeya River, rises the 327 metres (1,073 ft) high Kisilyakh-Tas, another important Kigilyakh site.

== History ==
The Suor Uyata was first mapped in the summer of 1870 by geographer and ethnologist Gerhard von Maydell (1835–1894) during his pioneering research of East Siberia.

== Geography ==
The Suor Uyata rises in the northwestern area of the Kolyma Lowland, only 20 kilometers (12 mi) to the east of the eastern end of the Ulakhan-Sis Range. It is a smaller range than the latter, of which it can be considered an eastern prolongation.

The main ridge stretches in a roughly WNW/ESE direction for about 60 kilometers (37 mi). Its highest summit is the 512 metres (1,680 ft) high Salyr-Tas. To the north rises the Ulakhan-Tas (Улахан-Тас), a ridge that stretches roughly northwards for about 40 kilometers (25 mi), whose tallest peak is 576 metres (1,890 ft) high.

The Suor Uyata is surrounded on all sides by marshy areas with slow-flowing rivers and a multitude of lakes. The sources of several rivers are on the range, including the Bolshaya Khomus-Yuryakh, Malaya Khomus-Yuryakh, Kumuruk-Yuryakh, Soldat and Byya (Быя), as well as some source area tributaries of the Sundrun River on the western side.

== Flora and fauna ==
The area of the Suor Uyata is marked by permafrost. The climate is subarctic and severe and the range is covered in mountain tundra.

The area of the Suor Uyata is part of the migration corridor of the Sundrun reindeer population, which includes the adjoining Ulakhan-Tas, the Kondakov Plateau to the NW, and the forest-tundra of the Rossokha River basin. The Suor Uyata / Ulakhan Tas mountain zone is a protected area, a regional nature reserve.

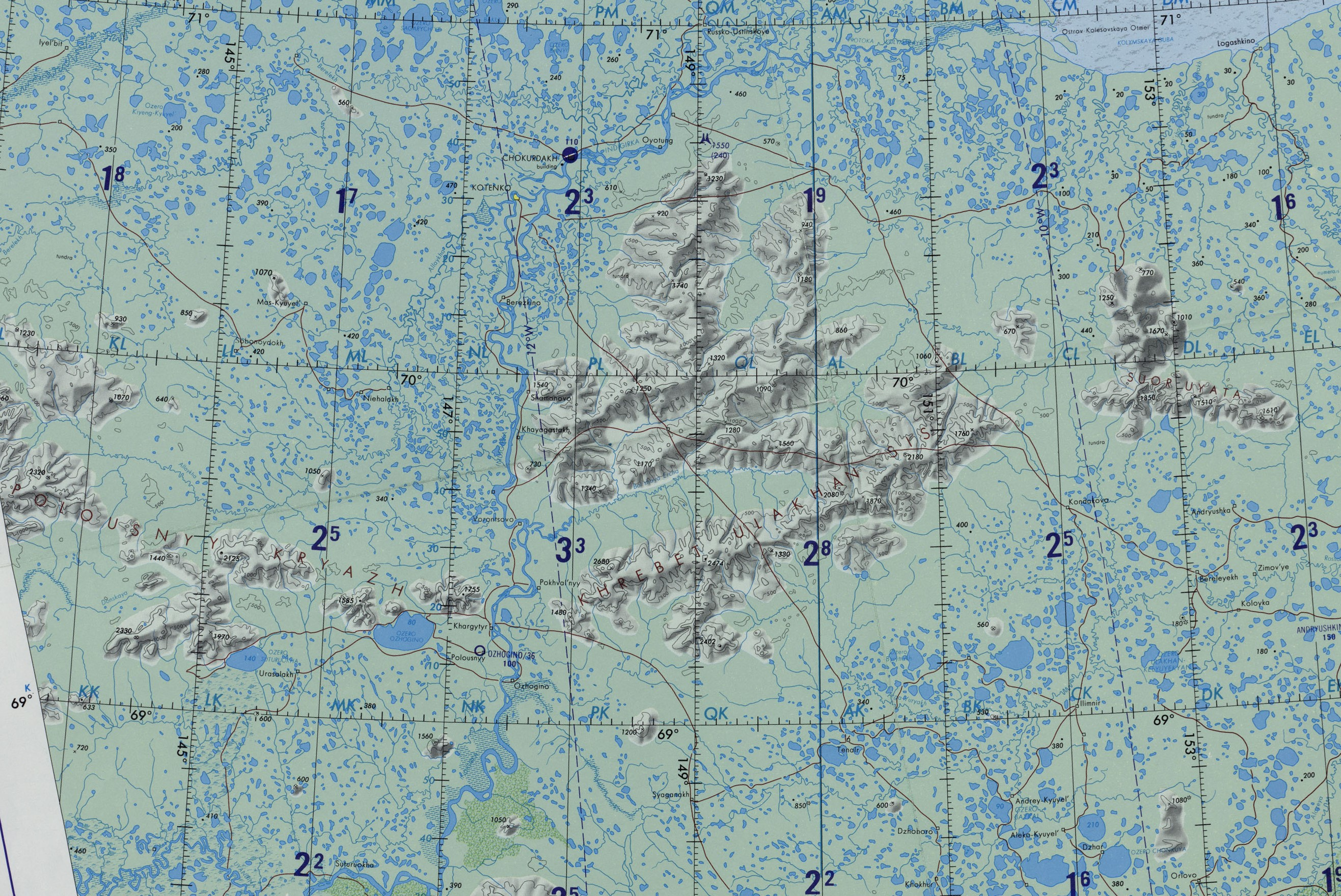
Ulakhan-Sis map section with the Suor Uyata on the right.
