= Mikhalkino =

Mikhalkino Михалкино
- Selo
- Interactive map of Mikhalkino
- Location of Mikhalkino Mikhalkino (Sakha Republic)
- Coordinates: 69°26′07″N 161°33′03″E
- Country: Russia
- Federal subject: Sakha Republic
- Administrative district: Nizhnekolymsky District
- Rural okrugSelsoviet: Pokhodsky Rural Okrug

Population (2010 Census)
  - Total: 0
  - Estimate (2021): 0 )

Municipal status
  - Municipal district: Nizhnekolymsky Municipal District
  - Rural settlement: Pokhodsky Rural Settlement
- Time zone: UTC+11 (MSK+8)
- Postal code: 678822
- OKTMO ID: 98637424126

Mikhalkino (Russian: Михалкино) was a rural locality (a selo) in Pokhodsky Rural Okrug of Nizhnekolymsky District in the Sakha Republic, Russia, located 80 kilometers (50 mi) from Chersky, the administrative center of the district and 44 kilometers (27 mi) from Pokhodsk. Its population as of the 2010 Census was 0, the same as recorded during the 2002 Census.
