= Nikolay Kurilov =

Russian artist, writer, and ethnographer

Nikolai Nikolaevich Kurilov (Northern Yukaghir: Микалай Курилэу, Russian: Николай Николаевич Курилов; born June 11, 1949) is a Yukaghir Russian artist, writer, and ethnographer. He also wrote under the name Okat Bei (Окат Бэй). Brother of the writer Uluro Ado (Gavril Kurilov) and the artist and writer Semyon Kurilov.

He was born in Andryushkino, Nizhnekolymsky district, Yakut ASSR. He studied in the Krasnoyarsk art college. After his studies, returned to his home region and worked as a teacher of engineering drawing and esthetics, and as a designer in Chersky, and as a photo reporter in the newspaper Kolymskaya pravda.

Since 1976, he participated in the regional and national exhibitions, wrote poetry and prose, and lectured at seminars for beginner writers. A member of the Artists's Union of the USSR, and of the Union of Soviet Writers since 1988.

Since 1994 he was staff researcher of the Institute for Humanities Research and Indigenous Studies of the North or the Russian Academy of Sciences. In 1994, he traveled in the United States populated by Indigenous peoples, and studied their art. Since 1997 , worked as an editor and an announcer of the Gevan radio station, which broadcasts in the languages of indigenous peoples of Northern Russia.

He writes in Yukaghir, Sakha and Russian in different genres, including stories about the life of Northern peoples, children's literature, poetry, textbooks, and science fiction. Together with his brother Gavril he wrote the first Yukaghir children alphabet book.

Married to the artist Ulyana Prokopyevna.

== Awards ==
- 1981: "Best debut", presented by the Yakut regional committee of the Komsomol

== Bibliography ==
- Тимофеева, Влада Владиславовна. Николай Курилов = Микалай Курилэу / З.И. Иванова-Унарова. — Якутск: Бичик, 2012. — 156 с. — ISBN 978-5-7696-3722-3.
- Звездолёт над тундрой, Ольга Рычкова, Литературная Россия, 08.09.2006.
- Курилов Николай Николаевич на сайте Якутского государственного литературного музея
