= Church of the Twelve Apostles =

The Patriarchal Chambers and the Church of the Twelve Apostles
- Патриаршие палаты и церковь Двенадцати апостолов
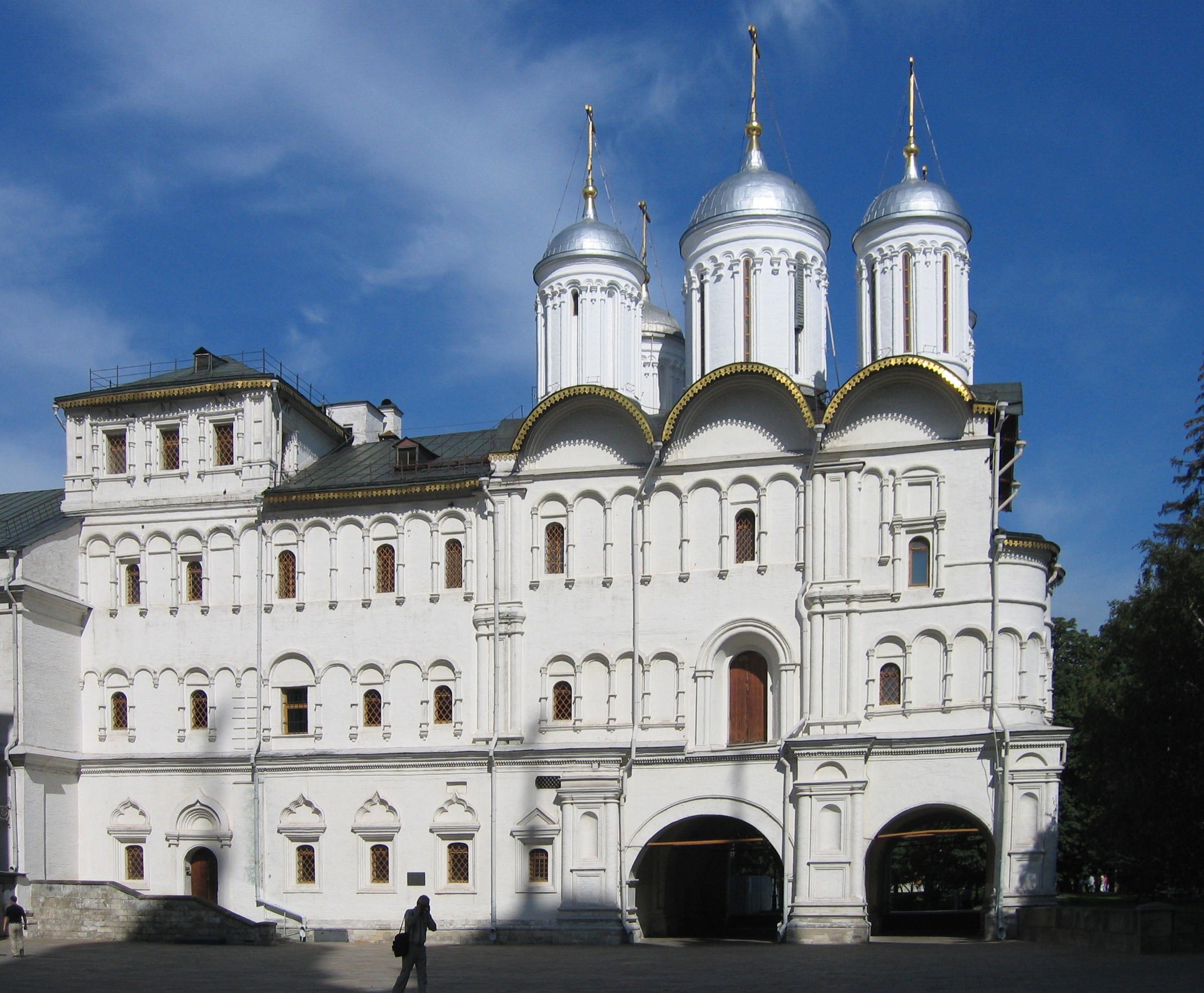
- The Patriarchal Chambers and the Church of the Twelve Apostles
- 55°45′05″N 37°37′03″E
- Location: Moscow
- Country: Russia
- Denomination: Russian Orthodox
- Website: http://www.kreml.ru/ru/main/museums/patriarchal/

History
- Founder: Patriarch Nikon of Moscow
- Consecrated: 1656

Architecture
- Architectural type: Russian
- Style: Russian

The Patriarchal Chambers and the Church of the Twelve Apostles (Russian: церковь Двенадцати Апостолов, romanized: tserkov' Dvenadtsati Apostolov) is a minor cathedral of the Moscow Kremlin, commissioned by Patriarch Nikon as part of his stately residence in 1653 and dedicated to Philip the Apostle three years later. Today, it is used by Moscow Kremlin Museums.

The church is almost as prominent as neighbouring grand cathedrals of the 15th century, due to its placement upon a high podium, pierced by two large arches allowing passage from the Cathedral Square to the patriarch's courtyard. The exterior walls are decorated with two belts of columned arches which reference both the neighbouring cathedrals of the Cathedral Square and the great churches of the 12th-century Vladimir-Suzdal school which had been their inspiration. The rigorous outline of five helmeted domes, in keeping with Nikon's conservative architectural tastes, serves to accentuate the church's Byzantine pedigree.

== History ==
=== Early history ===
The premises of the Muscovite metropolitan had existed in the Kremlin since the 14th century, Patriarch Nikon, who aspired to rival the Tsar in authority and magnificence, had them replaced with a much more ambitious residence, centered on a spacious chamber in the form of the cross, once used as a banqueting hall but now serving as a museum of applied arts. starting with the first Metropolitan Peter, who settled in Moscow (beginning of the 14th century). Over the course of their long history, the buildings of the metropolitan and then the patriarchal court have undergone many changes.

The first stone chamber on the estate was built in 1450, under Jonah of Moscow, at the same time the Church of the Deposition of the Robe was erected, which became the house church of the Moscow metropolitans. After the Moscow fire in 1473, the courtyard burned out, and in 1484-1485 (already under Gerontius of Moscow) the church and chambers were rebuilt. However, after the fire of 1493, the compound was again rebuilt. In the years 1566–1568, on the east side, the church of the Solovetsky miracle workers was added to the mansions, the base of which was used as a main passage to the courtyard of the estate. With the establishment in 1589 of the Moscow Patriarchate, the metropolitan court became patriarchal. In 1597, the complex was renovated by Patriarch Job of Moscow, the chambers were thoroughly rebuilt, while preserving the composition of housing traditional for Russia (two dwellings on the sides of the canopy). At the same time, another church was erected from the northern part of the courtyard the Three Saints of Moscow: Peter, Alexy and Jonah. It was connected to the chambers by a passage with a passage in the underbelly section. Thus, the structure of the courtyard included three house churches.

In 1652–1656, the old buildings, including the church of the Solovetsky Miracle Workers, were demolished, and new three-story chambers and a house church were built in their place, which were consecrated in 1656 in the name of the Apostle Philip and Metropolitan Philip. The roofs and crosses of the temple were covered with copper sheets and gilded (gilded onion chapters were preserved until the middle of the 19th century). The Cross Chamber was rebuilt; and the area reached 280 meters.

The Chambers were not inferior in size and luxury to the royal Terem Palace. The richest patriarchal sacristy was located there . With its impressive area, it did not have a central support (the room was blocked by a closed arch on formwork), which was an innovation in architecture. Soon, during the trial of Nikon, the Patriarchal Chambers were cited as an example of his pride.

The chambers were rebuilt after Nikon. By 1673, one of the arches under the church of the Apostle Philip was laid, and in 1680–1681 (under Patriarch Joachim) it was rebuilt and consecrated in honor of the Twelve Apostles. Here, the patriarchs performed services, except for Holy Holidays, when services were held in the Assumption Cathedral. In 1691 (under Patriarch Adrian) a new floor was built over the chambers, from which the so-called Petrovsky Tent which has survived.

=== Synodal era ===
After the abolition of the patriarchate in 1721, the Moscow Synodal Office was located in the chambers. Under the leadership of architect Ivan Zarudny, the Church of the Twelve Apostles was divided into two floors, and the Patriarchal library was placed on the upper deck.

In 1722–1724, the windows of the Cross Chamber were redesigned. In 1748, it was examined by architect Dmitry Ukhtomsky, who saw the old shapes of cracks in the walls and arches. At his suggestion, they were picked up and filled with rubble and alabaster. At the same time, a new picturesque stove was made.

In the 1760s, the Church of the Three Saints collapsed, then in the early 1780s, new cracks from the upper tents were discovered in the vaults of the Mirovarnaya Chamber. In 1782, the tents were dismantled, and roof cracks and other damage were repaired by Ivan Yakovlev.

In 1790, it was planned to dismantle and rebuild the old vault above the Mirovarnaya Chamber, both outer walls along the lower floor and voids for stairs in the corners of the lower floor. The work was completed by 1794. At the same time, the size of the chamber and the number of windows were preserved. It is believed that the vault also retained its shape.

=== Recent history ===
After the Russian Revolution in 1917, in which the building was nationalized the following year, restoration work was carried out, and in 1929 the 17th century iconostasis from the destroyed Cathedral of the Ascension Monastery were relocated to the church. During the restoration, two passages located under the church were opened. Currently The first permanent exhibition opened in 1967, the modern exhibition has been operating since May 1987.

== Features ==
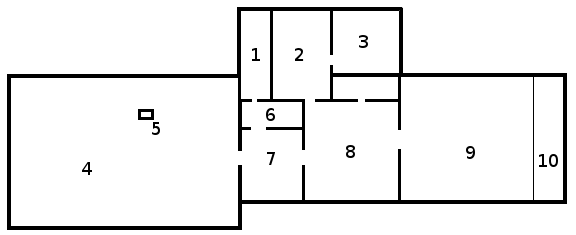
Simplified diagram of the second floor: 1 – Staircase, entrance; 2 – Order Chambers (living room); 3 – Order Chambers (cabinet); 4 – Cross (Mirovennaya) chamber; 5 – Oven for the preparation of the world; 6 – Small canopy; 7 – Ceremonial canopy; 8 – refectory; 9 - Church of the Cathedral of the Twelve Apostles; 10 - Iconostasis

Currently, the Patriarchal Chambers are a two-three-story building (in one place the remainder of the fourth floor is preserved – the Peter's tent), with a front facade facing south, on the Cathedral Square. The structure of the building includes the five-domed church of the Twelve Apostles with double-glazed windows. Under the church are two travel arches. A gallery on pillars is attached to the northern facade.

On the ground floor of the building there were household services and patriarchal orders, on the second floor there were chambers: the main entrance to the Krestovaya, the Canteen, the clerks, the main entrance hall, the refectory, and the church of the Twelve Apostles. On the third floor were the private chambers of the patriarch and the house church of the Apostle Philip.

The architectural decoration of the building includes pilasters at the passage arches, keel-shaped pediments of the windows of the first floor, and the arcature belt of the second and third floors. The second floor is separated from the first by a strongly protruding cornice, which is typical for the architecture of the 17th century. The white stone portal of the church on the second floor to the once bypass gallery around the building. Decorations of the building often repeat the details of the design of neighboring buildings of Cathedral Square.

On the east side are the apse of the church.

The northern facade has more modestly decorated. The arched gallery is decorated with patterned tiles.

== Interior ==
The chambers currently house a museum of Russian applied arts and everyday life of the XVII century. In addition to the exhibits included in the museum's exposition, the chambers and church retain elements of the original decorations. Fragments of XVIIth century wall paintings have been preserved in the church. A 19th-century marble cooker, made by order of Catherine II, is in its place in the Cross Chamber.

== Museum exposition ==
The museum shows artworks, religious and household items – personal belongings of patriarchs and members of the Royal Family, embroidery, books, icons, tableware, jewellery and clocks. The items are made by both Russian and foreign masters.

== Gallery ==
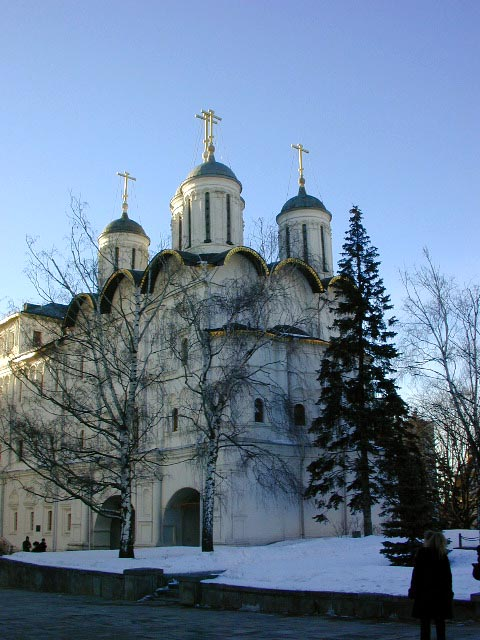

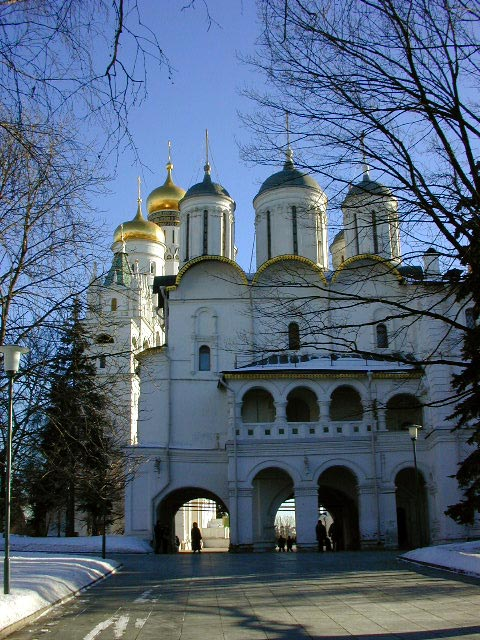

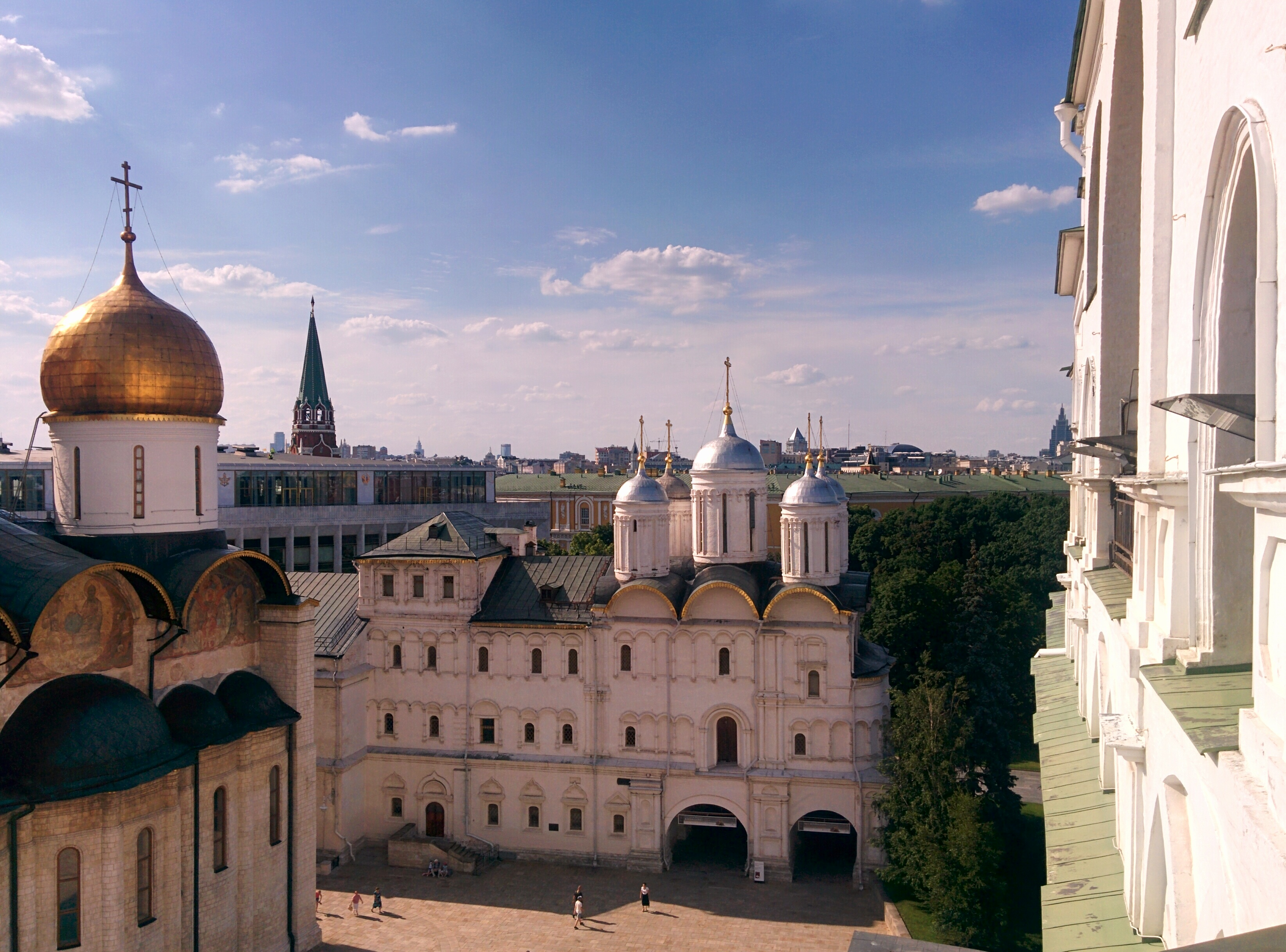

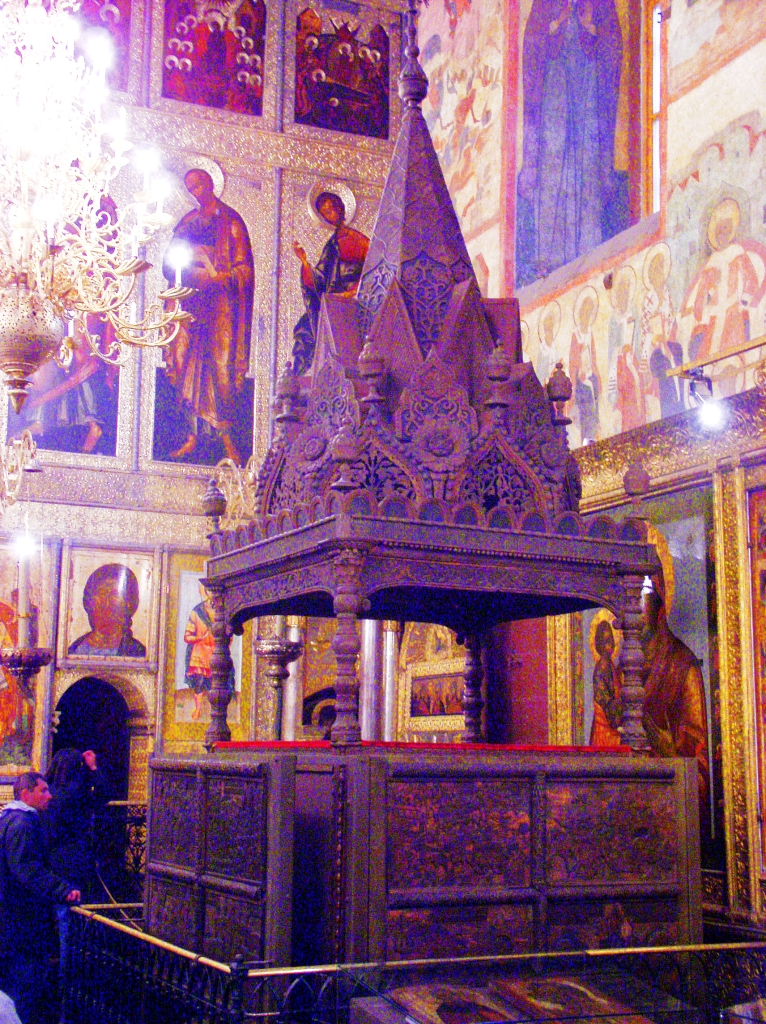

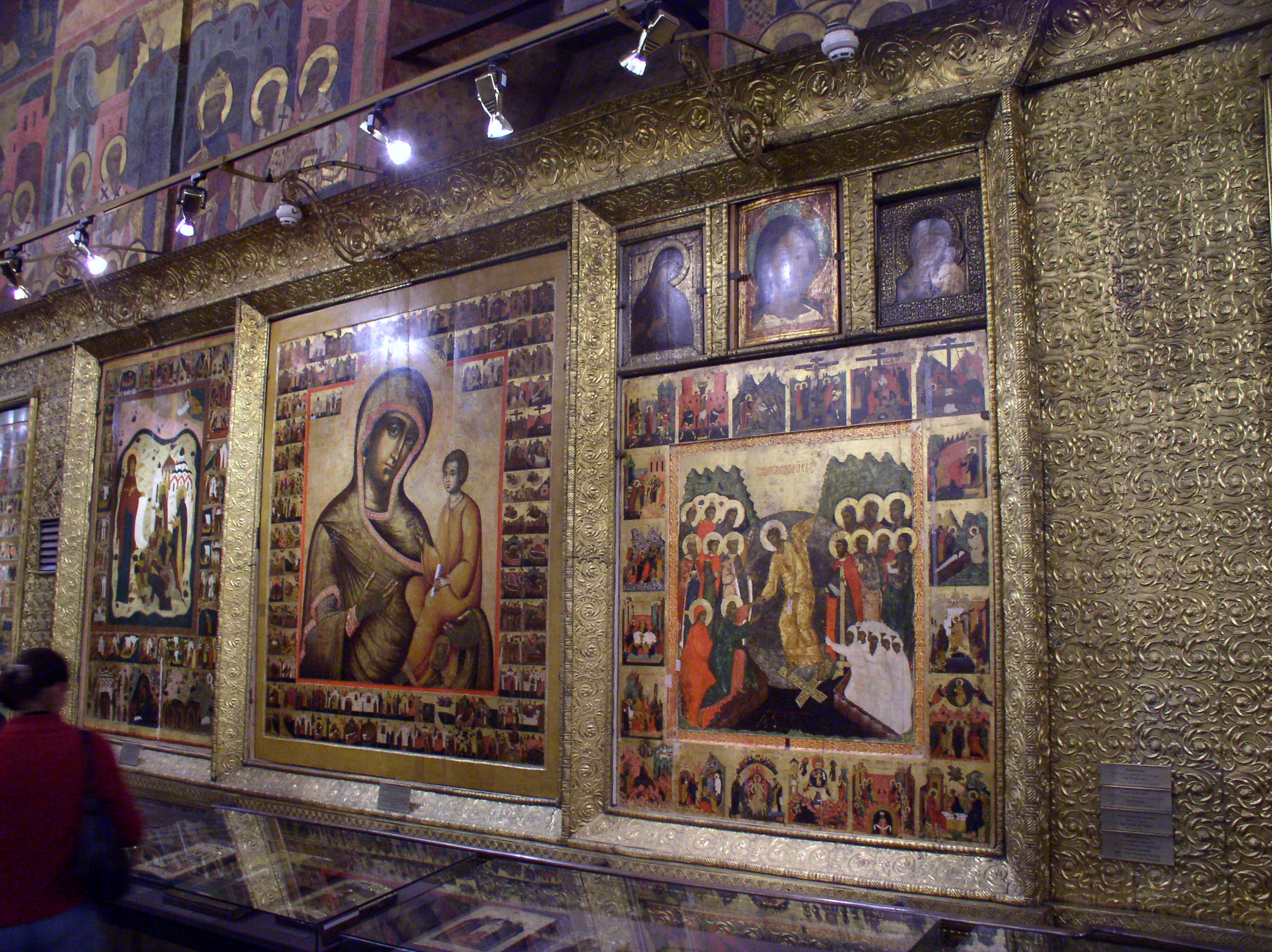
