= Krestovaya, Sakha Republic =

Krestovaya Крестовая
- Selo
- Interactive map of Krestovaya
- Location of Krestovaya Krestovaya (Sakha Republic)
- Coordinates: 70°54′50″N 158°32′59″E
- Country: Russia
- Federal subject: Sakha Republic
- Administrative district: Nizhnekolymsky District
- Rural okrugSelsoviet: Pokhodsky Rural Okrug
- Elevation: 5 m (16 ft)

Population (2010 Census)
  - Total: 0
  - Estimate (2021): 0 )

Municipal status
  - Municipal district: Nizhnekolymsky Municipal District
  - Rural settlement: Pokhodsky Rural Settlement
- Time zone: UTC+11 (MSK+8)
- Postal code: 678822
- OKTMO ID: 98637424121

Krestovaya (Russian: Крестовая) is a rural locality (a selo) in Pokhodsky Rural Okrug of Nizhnekolymsky District in the Sakha Republic, Russia, located 225 kilometers (140 mi) from Chersky, the administrative center of the district and 180 kilometers (110 mi) from Pokhodsk. Its population as of the 2010 Census was 0, the same as recorded during the 2002 Census.
