= Logashkino =

Former settlement in Sakha Republic, Russia

Coordinates: 70°51′N 153°55′E

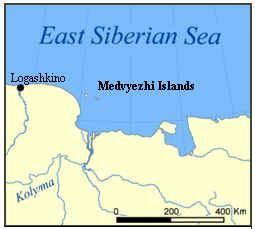
Logashkino on the map

Logashkino (Russian: Лога́шкино) was a settlement in Nizhnekolymsky Ulus of the Sakha Republic, Russia, which was abolished in 1998. It was a trading post on the shores of the Kolyma Bay, East Siberian Sea, located in the Logashkino harbor. Elevation: 8.8 metres (29 ft).

The settlement was located just east of the mouth of the Alazeya River in an area of tundra, swamps, and lakes.

== See also ==
- Valkumey – Another Siberian ghost town
