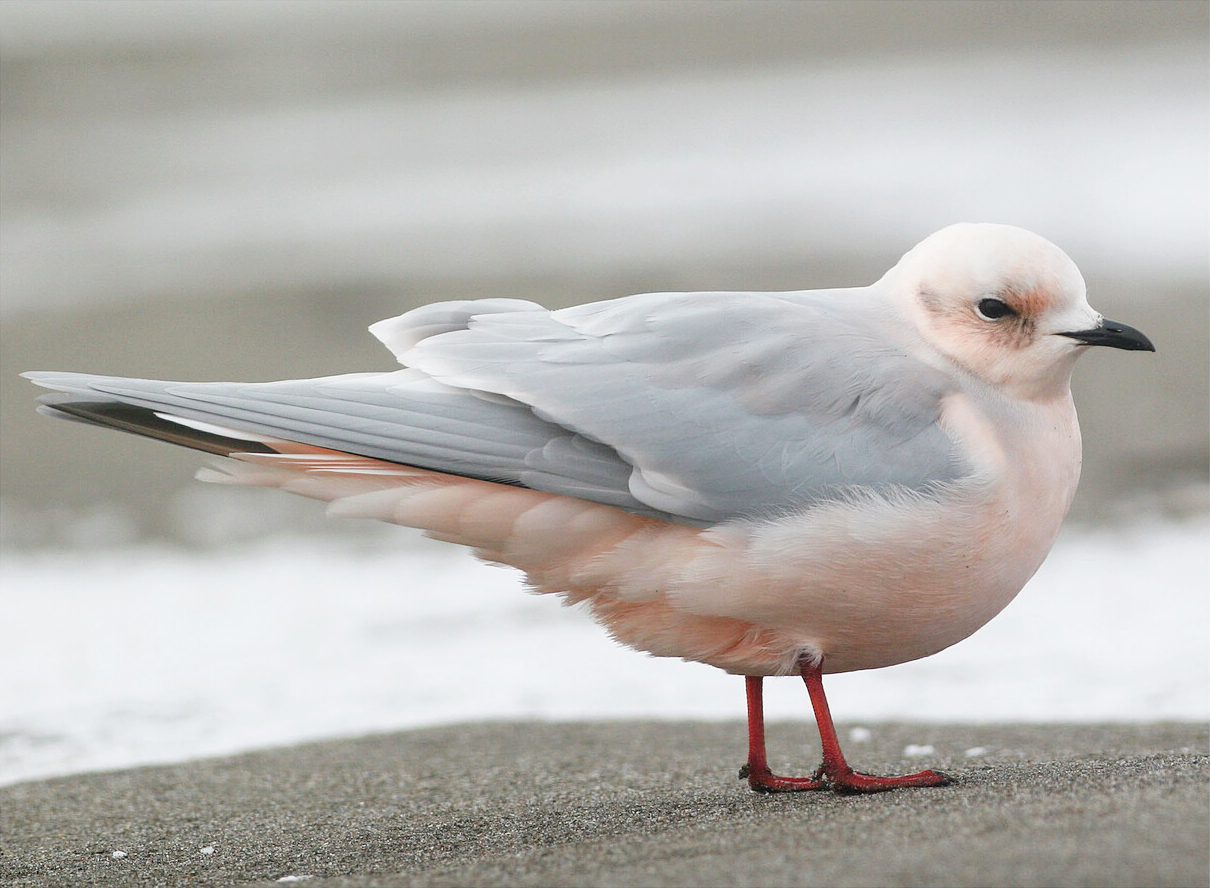
- Adult in winter plumage, Shiretoko, Japan

Conservation status
- Least Concern (IUCN 3.1)

Scientific classification
- Kingdom: Animalia
- Phylum: Chordata
- Class: Aves
- Order: Charadriiformes
- Family: Laridae
- Genus: Rhodostethia; MacGillivray, 1842
- Species: R. rosea

Binomial name
- Rhodostethia rosea (MacGillivray, 1824); Melville Peninsula, Canada

Synonyms
- Hydrocoloeus roseus

= Ross's gull =

Species of bird

Ross's gull (Rhodostethia rosea) is a small gull, the only species in its genus, although it has been suggested the genus should be merged with the closely related Hydrocoloeus, which otherwise only includes the little gull.

This bird is named after the British explorer James Clark Ross. Its breeding grounds were first discovered in 1905 by Sergei Aleksandrovich Buturlin near the village of Pokhodsk in northeastern Yakutia, while visiting the area as a judge. The genus name Rhodostethia is from Ancient Greek rhodon, "rose", and stethos, "breast". The specific rosea is Latin for "rose-coloured".

== Description ==
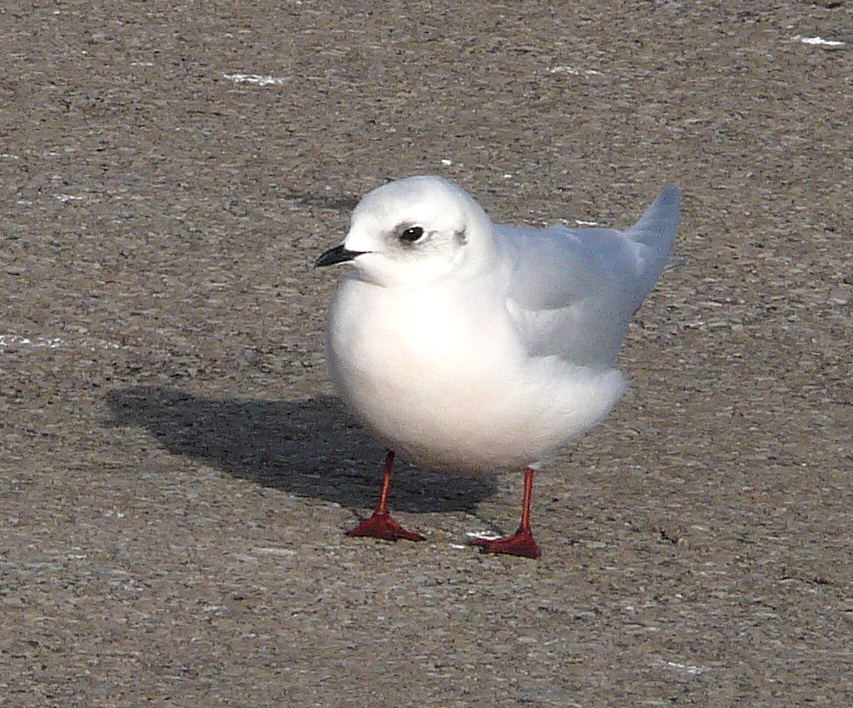
An adult in non-breeding plumage.

This small bird is similar in size and some plumage characteristics to the little gull. It is slightly larger and longer winged than the little gull, and has more pointed wings and a wedge-shaped tail. Its legs are red. Summer adults are pale grey above and white below, with a pink flush to the body feathering, and a neat black neck ring. In winter, the neck collar is lost, and a small dark crescent develops behind the eye; the pink colour, which is diet-related, is lost in some but not all individuals.

Young birds resemble winter adults, but have a dark "W" pattern on the wings in flight, like young little gulls, and lack the pink tones. The juveniles take two years to attain full adult plumage.

Ross's gull measurements:

- Length: 29–31 cm (11–12 in)
- Weight: 140–250 g (4.9–8.8 oz)
- Wingspan: 90–100 cm (35–39 in)

== Distribution and habitat ==
Ross's gull breeds in the high Arctic of northernmost North America, and northeast Siberia. It migrates only short distances south in autumn, most of the population wintering in northern latitudes at the edge of the pack ice in the northern Bering Sea and in the Sea of Okhotsk, although some birds reach more temperate areas, such as north west Europe; in February 2016 singles were sighted in Cornwall and Ireland according to the BTOs 'BirdTrack', in December 2021 two were seen in Belgium, one in Nieuwpoort and one in Zeebrugge. In North America, a Ross's gull has been spotted as far south as Salton Sea in California, although sightings this far south are extremely rare. The summer breeding grounds are tundra with sedges, grass tussocks, dwarf willows, bushes, lichens and pools.

== Biology ==
The Ross's gull breeds in small colonies on tundras and swampy Arctic estuaries, often nesting with other seabirds such as Arctic terns. It lays two to three eggs in a nest on the ground lined with seaweed, grass or moss, often on an island in a little lake. The eggs are olive green with small reddish-brown spots. Incubation takes about three weeks and the chicks fledge in another three weeks. Not all pairs successfully rear their young as predators and bad weather often take their toll.

This bird will eat any suitable small prey such as small fish and crustaceans, and during the winter often feeds on mudflats like a wader. During the breeding season it is largely insectivorous, feeding on beetles and flies.
