= Yermolovo, Sakha Republic =

Yermolovo Ермолово
- Selo
- Interactive map of Yermolovo
- Location of Yermolovo Yermolovo (Sakha Republic)
- Coordinates: 68°28′15″N 160°27′53″E
- Country: Russia
- Federal subject: Sakha Republic
- Administrative district: Nizhnekolymsky District
- Rural okrugSelsoviet: Pokhodsky Rural Okrug

Population (2010 Census)
  - Total: 0
  - Estimate (2021): 0 )

Municipal status
  - Municipal district: Nizhnekolymsky Municipal District
  - Rural settlement: Pokhodsky Rural Settlement
- Time zone: UTC+11 (MSK+8)
- Postal code: 678822
- OKTMO ID: 98637424116

Yermolovo (Russian: Ермолово) is a rural locality (a selo) in Pokhodsky Rural Okrug of Nizhnekolymsky District in the Sakha Republic, Russia, located 95 kilometers (59 mi) from Chersky, the administrative center of the district and 50 kilometers (31 mi) from Pokhodsk. Its population as of the 2010 Census was 0, the same as recorded during the 2002 Census.
