= Tysjöarna Nature Reserve =

Nature reserve in Jämtland, Sweden

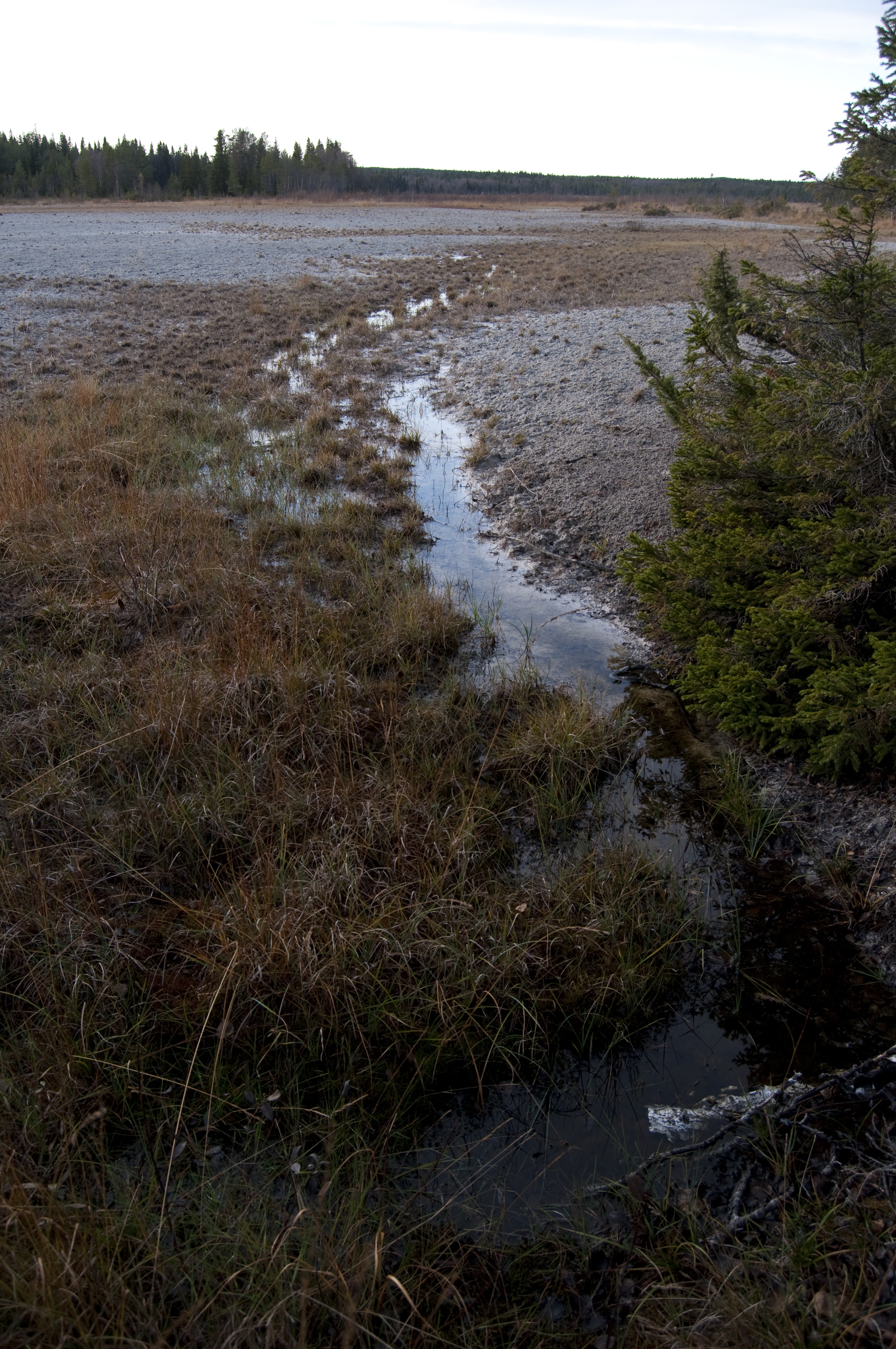

- Location within Jämtland Location within Sweden
- Location: Sweden
- Nearest city: Östersund
- Coordinates: 63°14′N 14°37′E
- Area: 4.5 km^{2} (1,100 acres)
- Established: 2013

Ramsar Wetland
- Official name: Tysjöarna
- Designated: 14 November 2001
- Reference no.: 1132

Tysjöarna Nature Reserve (Swedish: Tysjöarnas naturreservat) is a nature reserve in Jämtland County in Sweden. It is part of the EU-wide Natura 2000-network, and has been designated as a Ramsar site since 2001.

The nature reserve is an important resting area for migrating birds. Three towers for birdwatching have been built in the area. Species that are known to be found in Tysjöarna Nature Reserve include whooper swan, common crane, tufted duck, common goldeneye, little gull, northern lapwing and common redshank.
