= Buor-Yuryakh (disambiguation) =

Buor-Yuryakh may refer to Sakha rivers:

- Buor-Yuryakh, a right tributary of the Alazeya
- Buor-Yuryakh (Alazeya Plateau), a left tributary of the Alazeya
- Buor-Yuryakh (Chondon), a tributary of the Chondon
- Buor-Yuryakh, a tributary of the Khastakh
- Buor-Yuryakh (Kuydusun), a tributary of the Kuydusun
- Buor-Yuryakh (Selennyakh), a tributary of the Selennyakh
- Buor-Yuryakh (Uyandina), a tributary of the Uyandina
