= Kurilov =

Kurilov (masculine) or Kurilova (feminine) is a Slavic last name. Notable people with this last name include:

- Nikolay Kurilov (born 1949), Yukaghir Russian artist, writer, and ethnographer
- Oleksiy Kurilov (born 1988), Ukrainian association football player
- Stanislav Kurilov (1936–1998), Soviet, Canadian, and Israeli oceanographer
- Vasiliy Kurilov (1947–2019), Soviet Belarusian association football player and coach
