= Kolymskoye, Sakha Republic =

Kolymskoye Колымское Колымскай (Sakha)
- Selo
- Interactive map of Kolymskoye
- Location of Kolymskoye Kolymskoye (Sakha Republic)
- Coordinates: 68°44′N 158°42′E
- Country: Russia
- Federal subject: Sakha Republic
- Administrative district: Nizhnekolymsky District
- Rural okrugSelsoviet: Khalarchinsky Rural Okrug
- Founded: 1941

Population (2010 Census)
  - Total: 811
  - Estimate (2021): 765 (−5.7%)

Administrative status
  - Capital of: Khalarchinsky Rural Okrug

Municipal status
  - Municipal district: Nizhnekolymsky Municipal District
  - Rural settlement: Khalarchinsky Rural Settlement
  - Capital of: Khalarchinsky Rural Settlement
- Time zone: UTC+11 (MSK+8)
- Postal code: 678835
- OKTMO ID: 98637437101

Kolymskoye (Russian: Колымское; Yakut: Колымскай; Chukchi: Экуԓумэн) is a rural locality (a selo), the only inhabited locality, and the administrative center of Khalarchinsky Rural Okrug of Nizhnekolymsky District in the Sakha Republic, Russia, located 110 kilometers (68 mi) from Chersky, the administrative center of the district. Its population as of the 2010 Census was 811, down from 835 recorded during the 2002 Census.
