= Kisilyakh-Tas =

Mountain in Yakutia, Russia

- Кисилях-Тас
- Location within Sakha Republic

Highest point
- Elevation: 327 m (1,073 ft)
- Coordinates: 69.7021615°N 154.9916571°E

Dimensions
- Area: 20 km^{2} (7.7 mi^{2})

Geography
- Country: Russia
- Federal subject: Sakha Republic
- Parent range: East Siberian System

Geology
- Rock type: Granite-porphyry

Climbing
- Easiest route: From Andryushkino

Kisilyakh-Tas (Russian: гора Кисилях-Тас) is a mountain in Yakutia, Far Eastern Federal District, Russia. Administratively it belongs to the Lower Kolyma District.

This mountain is one of the renowned places of Yakutia where kigilyakhs are found. The largest of them are between 10 meters (33 ft) and 30 meters (98 ft) in height. Kigilyakhs are rock formations that are held in high esteem by Yakuts. Kisilyakh means "Mountain having a man" or "Mountain married" in the Yakut language.

== Geography ==
Mount Kisilyakh-Tas is a small, isolated mountain massif of the Kolyma Lowland, located 40 kilometers (25 mi) east of the Suor Uyata range. It rises above the tundra on the right bank of the Alazeya, roughly 160 kilometres (99 mi) south of the river's mouth in the shores of the East Siberian Sea.

Kisilyakh-Tas is located in a flat area, where there are only two other mountains nearby, a higher one to the SW and a smaller one to the west, both on the other side of the river. The three mountains are roughly at the same distance from each other.

Andryushkino, the only inhabited place nearby, is located 60 kilometers (37 mi) to the SSW of Kisilyakh-Tas mountain, up the Alazeya. The mountain is difficult to reach in the summer, but could be reached in April on a snowmobile if the weather is fine.

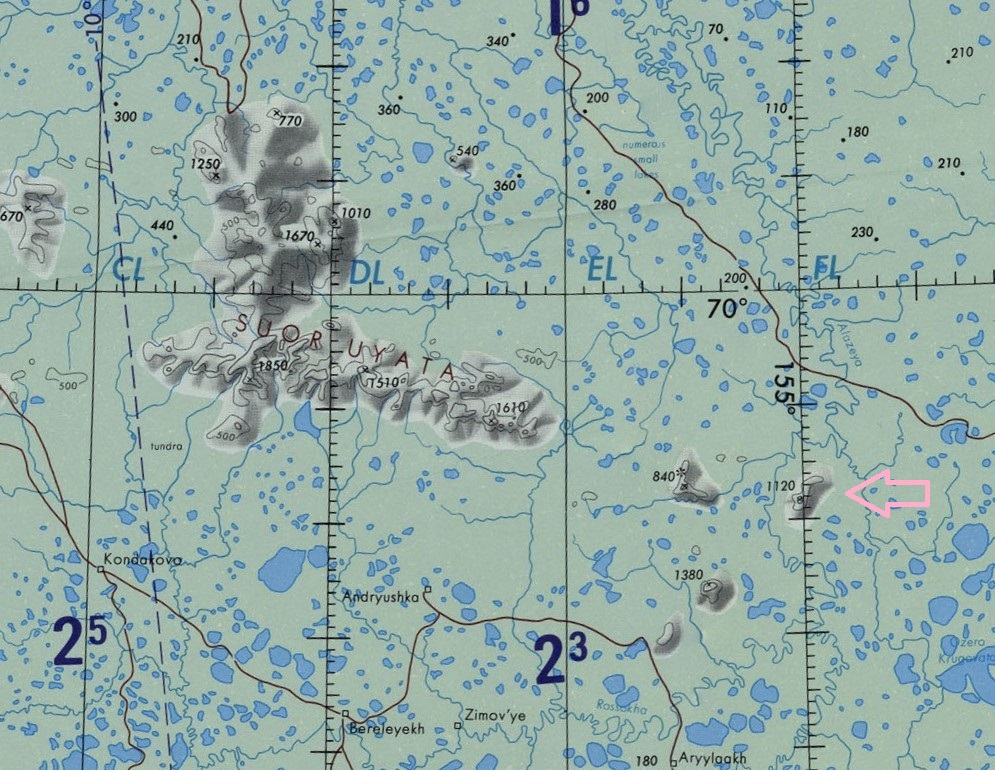
Map section of Suor Uyata Range and Mount Kisilyakh-Tas (arrow)

== See also ==
- Kigilyakh
- List of mountains in Russia
