= Buor-Yuryakh =

River in Yakutia, Russia

Buor-Yuryakh Буор-Юрях / Буор-Үрэх
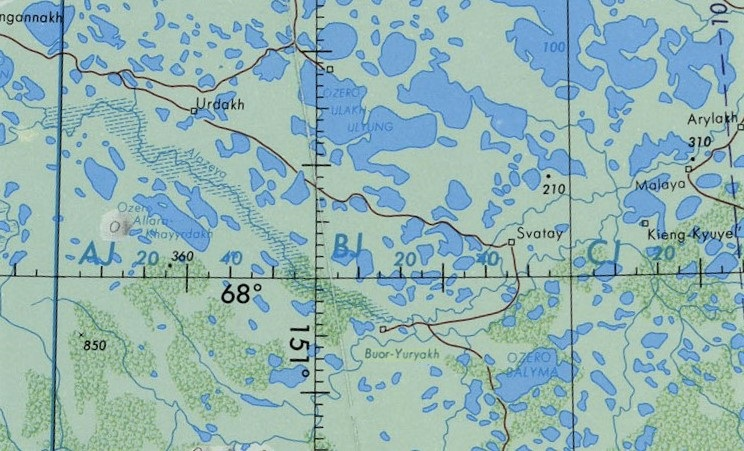
- Buor-Yuryakh course ONC map section

- Mouth location in Yakutia, Russia

Location
- Country: Russia

Physical characteristics
- Source
  - location: Kolyma Lowland
  - coordinates: 67°57′29″N 149°54′24″E
- Mouth: Alazeya
  - coordinates: 68°07′44″N 152°12′26″E
- Length: 244 km (152 mi)
- Basin size: 5,170 km^{2} (2,000 sq mi)

Basin features
- Progression: Alazeya → Laptev Sea

The Buor-Yuryakh (Russian: Буор-Юрях; Yakut: Буор-Үрэх, Buor-Ürex) is a river in the Sakha Republic (Yakutia), Russia. It is the second largest tributary of the Alazeya. The river has a length of 244 kilometres (152 mi) and a drainage basin area of 5,170 square kilometres (2,000 mi^{2}).

The Buor-Yuryakh flows north of the Arctic Circle, across desolate territories of the Srednekolymsky District. The name of the river comes from the Yakut "Буор Үрэх" "Buor" = earth, clay / "Yurekh" = river.

== Course ==
The Buor-Yuryakh is a right tributary of the Alazeya. It has its sources in the Kolyma Lowland, off the southern foothills of the Alazeya Plateau. The river flows across a floodplain among numerous lakes forming meanders all along its course. It heads first in a roughly southeastward direction. South of the area of lake Ilka it bends and turns east. Then it turns northeastwards to the east of the lake, bending again eastwards after a stretch, leaving lake Balyma to the south. Finally the Buor-Yuryakh bends northwards to the west of lake Nikolskoye and joins the Alazeya 1,012 km (629 mi) from its mouth.

=== Tributaries ===
The main tributary of the Buor-Yuryakh is the 102 km (63 mi) long Rassokha that joins its right bank 6.2 km (3.9 mi) before the confluence with the Alazeya. There are more than 2,100 lakes in the river basin. The Buor-Yuryakh is frozen between the first half of October and early June.

== See also ==
- List of rivers of Russia
