= Ambarchik Bay =

Shallow bay in the eastern Kolyma Gulf in the East Siberian Sea

- бухта Амбарчик (Russian)
- Map showing the location of the bay

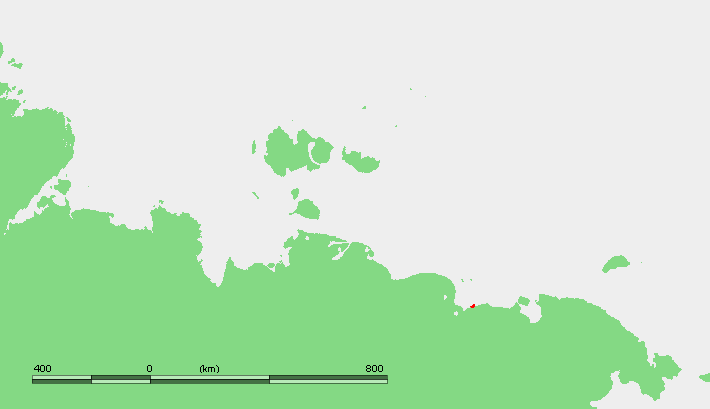
- Location: Far North
- Coordinates: 69°39′N 162°18′E
- Ocean/sea sources: East Siberian Sea
- Basin countries: Russia
- Settlements: Ambarchik

Ambarchik Bay (Russian: бухта Амбарчик) is a shallow bay in the eastern Kolyma Gulf in the East Siberian Sea. The location is within the Sakha Autonomous Republic, Russia, located approximately 1,700 kilometers (1,100 mi) (by air) north-east of Yakutsk. The port and polar station of Ambarchik (a transit station during the Gulag), is located on the coastline of the bay.

In 1932 Dalstroi organised the Kolyma maritime division at the mouth of the river. In November that year prisoners from Sevvostlag began to build the wharves of a seaport in Ambarchik Bay. From 1932 to 1954 a transit camp was located there.

In 1993 a plaque in commemoration of the prisoners was erected there.

== Climate ==
Climate data for Ambarchik Bay (extremes 1933-present)
Month	Jan	Feb	Mar	Apr	May	Jun	Jul	Aug	Sep	Oct	Nov	Dec	Year
Record high °C (°F)	8.6 (47.5)	2.2 (36.0)	3.2 (37.8)	6.2 (43.2)	24.3 (75.7)	30.7 (87.3)	32.8 (91.0)	31.8 (89.2)	21.7 (71.1)	13.9 (57.0)	4.3 (39.7)	6.5 (43.7)	32.8 (91.0)
Mean daily maximum °C (°F)	−25.9 (−14.6)	−26.2 (−15.2)	−19.8 (−3.6)	−11.4 (11.5)	−0.1 (31.8)	9.6 (49.3)	12.5 (54.5)	10.3 (50.5)	4.7 (40.5)	−5.5 (22.1)	−15.3 (4.5)	−23.5 (−10.3)	−7.5 (18.4)
Daily mean °C (°F)	−29.3 (−20.7)	−29.3 (−20.7)	−23.4 (−10.1)	−15.4 (4.3)	−3.7 (25.3)	5.1 (41.2)	7.8 (46.0)	6.6 (43.9)	2.0 (35.6)	−8.1 (17.4)	−18.5 (−1.3)	−26.8 (−16.2)	−11.1 (12.1)
Mean daily minimum °C (°F)	−32.4 (−26.3)	−32.3 (−26.1)	−27.0 (−16.6)	−19.4 (−2.9)	−7.0 (19.4)	1.5 (34.7)	4.0 (39.2)	3.3 (37.9)	−0.5 (31.1)	−10.9 (12.4)	−21.8 (−7.2)	−29.9 (−21.8)	−14.4 (6.2)
Record low °C (°F)	−49.5 (−57.1)	−49.2 (−56.6)	−46.1 (−51.0)	−38.5 (−37.3)	−30.0 (−22.0)	−17.0 (1.4)	−3.8 (25.2)	−6.4 (20.5)	−15.4 (4.3)	−30.3 (−22.5)	−41.7 (−43.1)	−45.9 (−50.6)	−49.5 (−57.1)
Average precipitation mm (inches)	5.1 (0.20)	3.9 (0.15)	4.3 (0.17)	3.2 (0.13)	5.6 (0.22)	11.5 (0.45)	21.9 (0.86)	19.6 (0.77)	18.6 (0.73)	14.6 (0.57)	10.2 (0.40)	6.0 (0.24)	124.5 (4.89)
Source: pogoda.ru.net
