= Bolshaya Chukochya =

Bolshaya Chukochya Большая Чукочья / Рэвум-Рэву
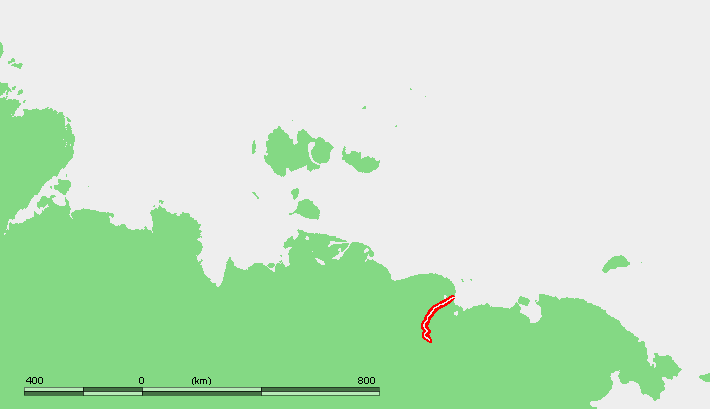
- Location of the Bolshaya Chukochya in Far-East Siberia

- Mouth location in Yakutia, Russia

Location
- Country: Russia

Physical characteristics
- Source
  - location: Usun-Kyuel
  - coordinates: 68°02′56″N 155°41′33″E
  - elevation: 44 m (144 ft)
- Mouth: East Siberian Sea
  - coordinates: 70.0911°N 159.9269°E
  - elevation: 0 m (0 ft)
- Length: 758 km (471 mi)
- Basin size: 19,800 km^{2} (7,600 sq mi)

The Bolshaya Chukochya or Chukochya (Russian: Большая Чукочья; Chukot: Рэвум-Рэву, Revum-Revu) is a river in the Sakha Republic (Yakutia) of the Russian Federation. It is 758 kilometres (471 mi) long, and has a drainage basin of 19,800 square kilometres (7,600 sq mi).

== Course ==
It has its sources in Lake Usun-Kyuel and crosses the tundra roughly northeastwards. In its lower course it flows south of Lake Bolshoye Morskoye. Finally it flows into the Kolyma Gulf of the East Siberian Sea west of the mouths of the Kolyma. Owing to its extreme northerly location the Bolshaya Chukochya freezes up in early October and remains icebound until June.

The Bolshaya Chukochya basin is located between the basins of the Alazeya and the Kolyma. There are study sites near the Bolshaya Chukochya in order to investigate the mineral transformations in the soils affected by permafrost.

=== Tributaries ===
The main tributaries of the Bolshaya Chukochya are the 229 km (142 mi) long Olyor (Олёр) and the 121 km (75 mi) long Semen-Yuryakh (Семен-Юрях) on the left, as well as the 106 km (66 mi) long Savva-Yuryakh (Савва-Юрях) on the right. There are more than 11,500 lakes in the Bolshaya Chukochya basin, totaling an area of 3,600 km^{2} (1,400 sq mi).

== Ecology ==
The Kolyma Lowland, the area where the Bolshaya Chukochya flows, has many lakes and marshes. A great variety of birds, such as Siberian cranes, waders and sandpipers, make their habitat in this riverine area. The Cherskii's char (Salvelinus czerskii), is a char species found in the river basin.

Fossil insects, early Pleistocene equids and mammoths have been found in the basin of the Bolshaya Chukochya.

== See also ==
- List of rivers of Russia
