= Krestovsky =

Krestovsky may refer to:

- Krestovsky, extinct stratovolcano, at Ushkovsky massif, Kamchatka, Russia
- Krestovskky Bridge, Moscow, Russia
- Krestovsky Island
- Krestovsky Lesouchastok
- Krestovsky Ostrov (Saint Petersburg Metro)
- Krestovsky Stadium

== Surname ==
- Yaroslav Krestovsky
- Vsevolod Krestovsky
