= Petushki, Perm Krai =

Petushki Петушки
- Village
- Location within Perm Krai Location within Russia
- Coordinates: 57°43′N 55°42′E
- Country: Russia
- Region: Perm Krai
- District: Permsky District
- Time zone: UTC+5:00

Petushki (Russian: Петушки) is a rural locality (a village) in Yugo-Kamskoye Rural Settlement, Permsky District, Perm Krai, Russia. The population was 6 as of 2010. There are 2 streets.

== Geography ==
Petushki is located 49 km southwest of Perm (the district's administrative centre) by road. Verkh-Yug is the nearest rural locality.
