= Petushki, Ivanovo Oblast =

Petushki Петушки
- Village
- Location within Ivanovo Oblast Location within Russia
- Coordinates: 56°42′N 42°01′E
- Country: Russia
- Region: Ivanovo Oblast
- District: Yuzhsky District
- Time zone: UTC+3:00

Petushki (Russian: Петушки) is a rural locality (a village) in Yuzhsky District, Ivanovo Oblast, Russia. Population: 24 (2010 census);

== Geography ==
This rural locality is located 13 kilometres (8.1 mi) from Yuzha (the district's administrative centre), 73 kilometres (45 mi) from Ivanovo (capital of Ivanovo Oblast) and 289 kilometres (180 mi) from Moscow. Gruzdevo is the nearest rural locality.
