= Kolymskoye, Magadan Oblast =

Kolymskoye Колымское
- Selo
- Location within Magadan Oblast Location within Russia
- Coordinates: 62°53′30″N 152°24′42″E
- Country: Russia
- Region: Magadan Oblast
- District: Srednekansky District
- Time zone: UTC+11:00

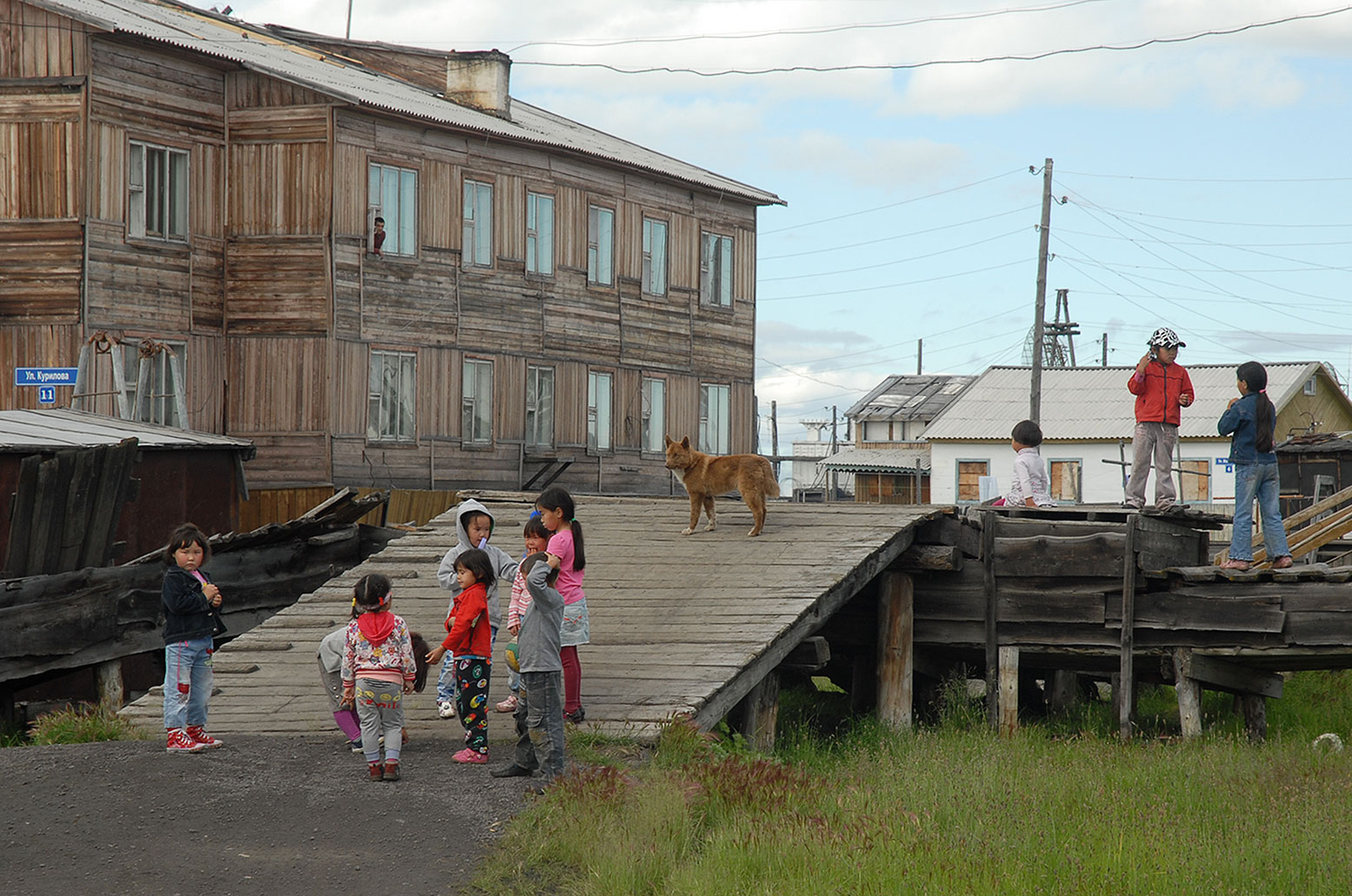
Kolymskoïe, Oblast de Magadan

Kolymskoye (Russian: Колымское) was a rural locality (a selo) in the Srednekansky District of Magadan Oblast, Russia. In 2005, the Magadan regional government decided to close the village and began a program to resettle its population. The settlement was officially declared closed in 2014, however, as of the 2021 Census, it recorded a population of four people.
