= Petushki, Sakha Republic =

Petushki Петушки Петушки (Sakha)
- Selo
- Interactive map of Petushki
- Location of Petushki Petushki (Sakha Republic)
- Coordinates: 69°00′N 161°33′E
- Country: Russia
- Federal subject: Sakha Republic
- Administrative district: Nizhnekolymsky District
- SettlementSelsoviet: Settlement of Chersky

Population (2010 Census)
  - Total: 0
  - Estimate (1989): 183 )
- Postal code: 678820

Petushki (Russian: Петушки; Yakut: Петушки, romanized: Petuşki) is a rural locality (a selo) under the administrative jurisdiction of the Settlement of Chersky in Nizhnekolymsky District of the Sakha Republic, Russia, located 35 kilometers (22 mi) from Chersky. Its population as of the 2010 Census was 0. Its population was estimated at 136 in 2005, down from 149 recorded in the 2002 Census.

It was slated for liquidation in 2005 but has not been officially abolished as of 2009.
