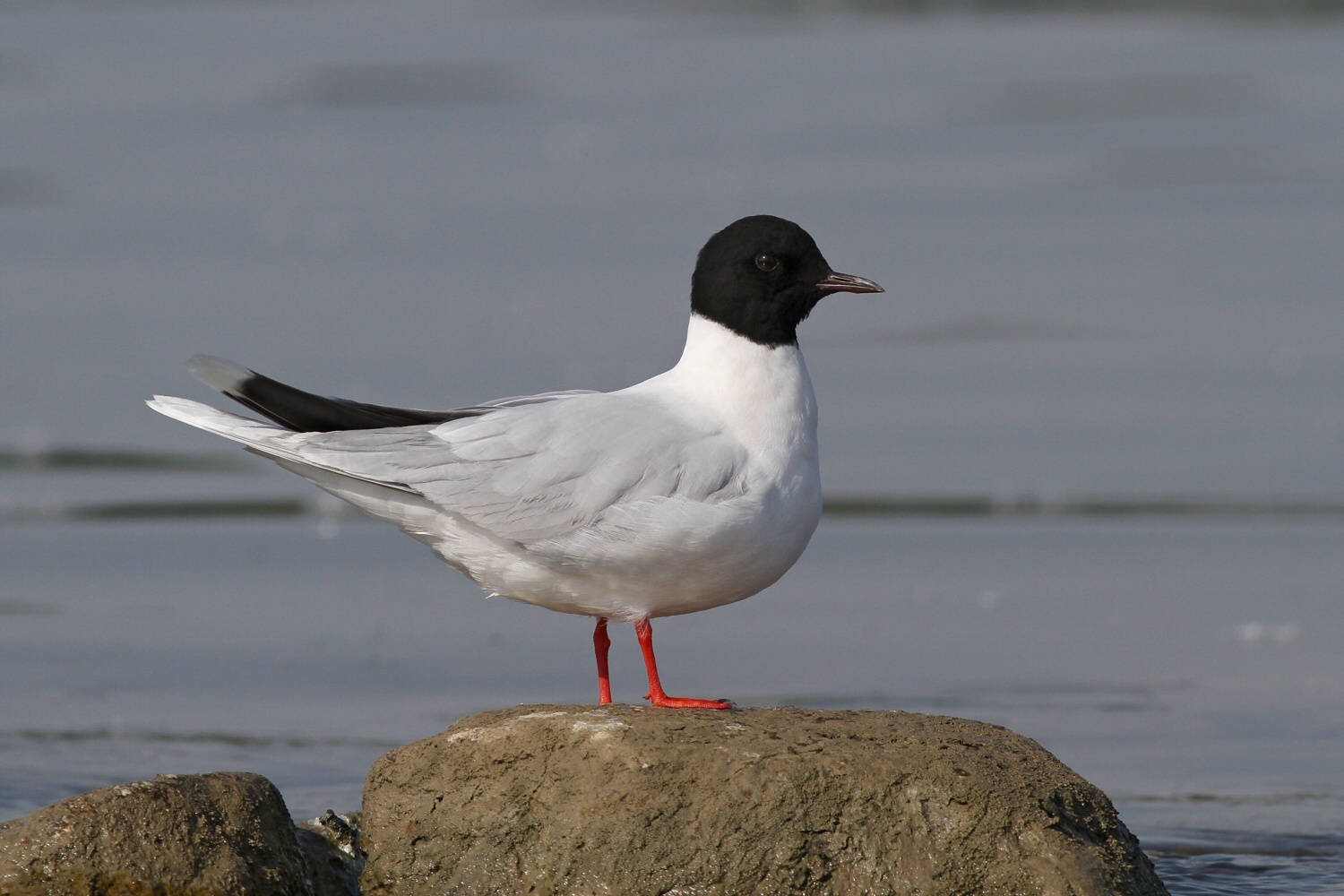
- Adult in summer plumage, Slovakia

Conservation status
- Least Concern (IUCN 3.1)

Scientific classification
- Kingdom: Animalia
- Phylum: Chordata
- Class: Aves
- Order: Charadriiformes
- Family: Laridae
- Genus: Hydrocoloeus; Kaup, 1829
- Species: H. minutus

Binomial name
- Hydrocoloeus minutus (Pallas, 1776) rivers of Siberia
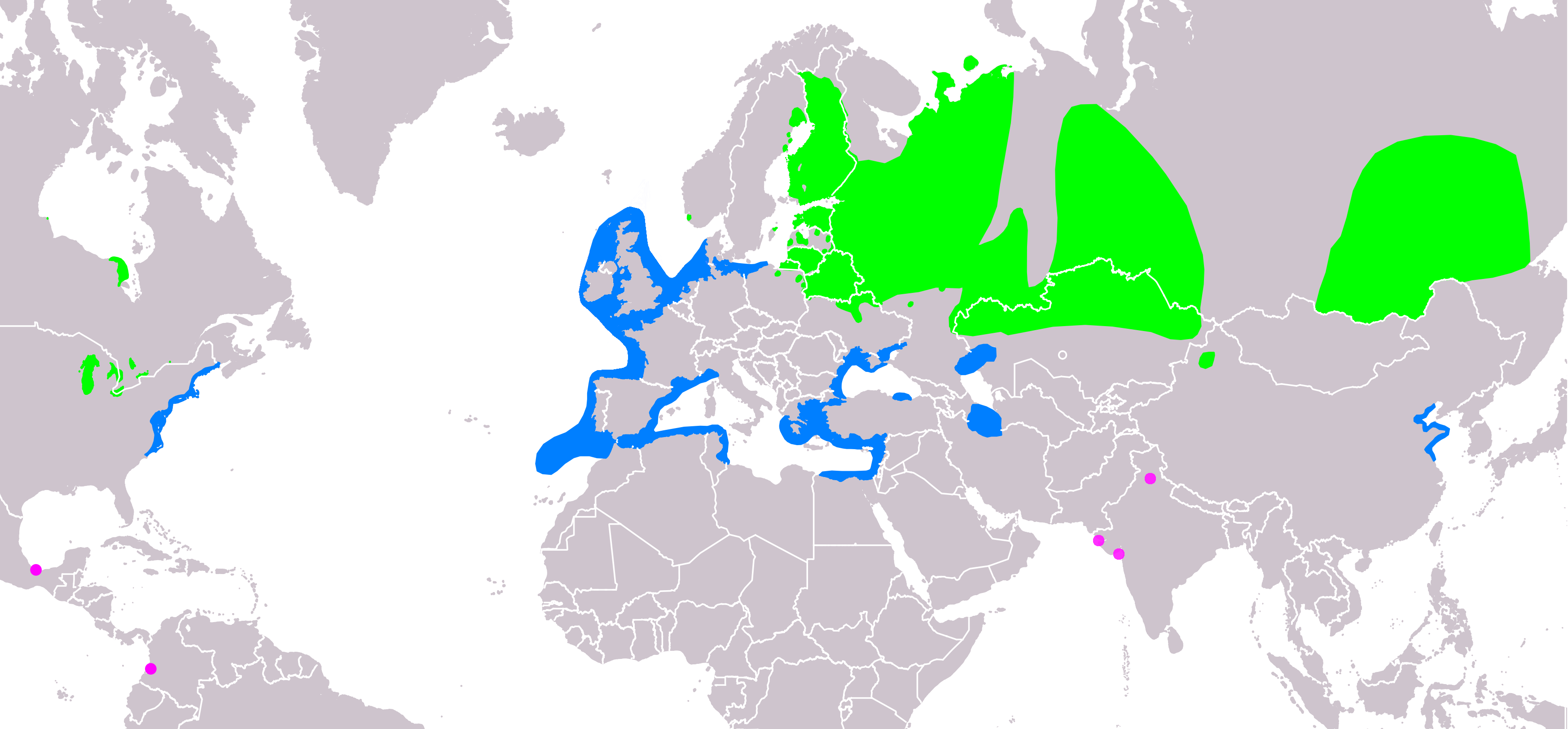
- Range of H. minutus Breeding Non-breeding Selected vagrant records

Synonyms
- Larus minutus Pallas, 1776; Larus atricilloides Falck, 1786

= Little gull =

Species of bird

The little gull (Hydrocoloeus minutus) is a species of gull belonging to the family Laridae which is mainly found in the Palearctic with some small colonies in North America. It breeds on freshwater lakes and marshes, and spends winters at sea. It is the smallest species of gull in the world, and the only species in the monospecific genus Hydrocoloeus.

== Taxonomy ==
The little gull was first formally described as Larus minutus in 1776 by the German ornithologist Peter Simon Pallas with its type locality given as Berezovo, Tobolsk in Siberia. In 1829, Johann Jakob Kaup proposed the genus Hydrocoloeus for this species, and George Robert Gray later formally designated Larus minutus as the type species of the genus. Kaup had also included Larus plumbiceps Meyer, 1822 in his genus Hydrocoloeus; this is a synonym of Chroicocephalus cirrocephalus (grey-headed gull). Hydrocoloeus minutus is the binomial accepted for this species and it is classified in the family Laridae, the gulls and terns, in the order Charadriiformes.

Within the Laridae, its closest relative is Ross's gull Rhodostethia rosea; some authors have even included Ross's gull in Hydrocoloeus rather than giving it its own genus, but this has not been accepted by any of the major ornithological authorities.

=== Etymology ===
The genus name Hydrocoloeus means "water jackdaw", from Ancient Greek hydro, water, and koloios, a jackdaw; Kaup, in naming the genus, compared the little gull to other gulls as he then went on to compare his new genus Coloeus for jackdaws to crows; Kaup had a personal theory of equivalence between members of different groups of birds based on their relative sizes. The specific minutus is Latin for "small".

== Description ==
The little gull has a body length of 24 to 28 cm (9.4 to 11.0 in) and a wing span of 62 to 69 cm (24 to 27 in), making it the smallest gull species in the world. The adults in breeding plumage have a black hood, dark red bill, bright red legs, and sometimes a rosy flush to the underside. In non-breeding plumage the adults have a black cap and spot on the ear, white underparts, a black bill and the red on the legs is duller. In all plumages the adults have a pale grey back and upperwings with white primaries contrasting with very dark grey underwing. The juveniles have large areas of blackish colour on the back and head and in flight they have a dark "w" pattern on the upperwings with white underwings. By their first winter the head and body are similar to those of an adult but the upperwing pattern is retained. By their second year they have become very similar to the adults but have some black primary feathers.

== Distribution ==
The little gull has a wide Palearctic distribution breeding from northern Scandinavia and the eastern Baltic Sea to eastern Siberia. They also breed in North America around the Great Lakes. It is a migratory species which winters along the coasts of Europe as far south as the Mediterranean, Black and Caspian Seas. They are uncommon in the western Pacific. In North America they winter along the Atlantic coasts in small numbers, as far south as the Carolinas. In the early 21st Century non-breeding birds have summered in western Europe in increasing numbers and in 2016 they successfully nested for the first time in Great Britain at the RSPB reserve at Loch of Strathbeg reserve in Aberdeenshire; they returned for a few days in May 2017, but did not breed again.

== Habitat ==
The little gull nests in areas of dense vegetation where there are emergent or plants with floating leaves in shallow freshwater bodies, slow-moving rivers, marshes and bogs, occasionally using costal lagoons or other brackish water habitats. When it is migrating this species is coastal but may be found inland in some conditions. They also winter on the coast where there are sand and mud substrates and at river mouths and even out to sea. They may be attracted to sewage outfalls.

== Biology ==
The little gull is a migratory species with separate breeding and wintering ranges. They typically arrive at their breeding areas from late-April up to late May and start to move away from the breeding areas from the middle of July. Laying eggs begins in mid-June and they commonly nest among other species of gull and tern to form mixed colonies, although some pairs will nest singly away from colonies. Away from the breeding areas this is a sociable species and feeds and loafs in flocks. These flocks can be very large and may number of thousands of birds if bad weather forces them into sheltered waters. The nests are situated on the ground or on the water, floating on leaves and fixed to emergent vegetation and are spaced at distances of 1 to 1.5 m (3 ft 3 in to 4 ft 11 in) from each other in colonies.

Breeding birds are insectivores and feed on a variety of insects caught on the wing close to the water and in winter the diet is dominated by small fish and marine invertebrates.

== Gallery ==
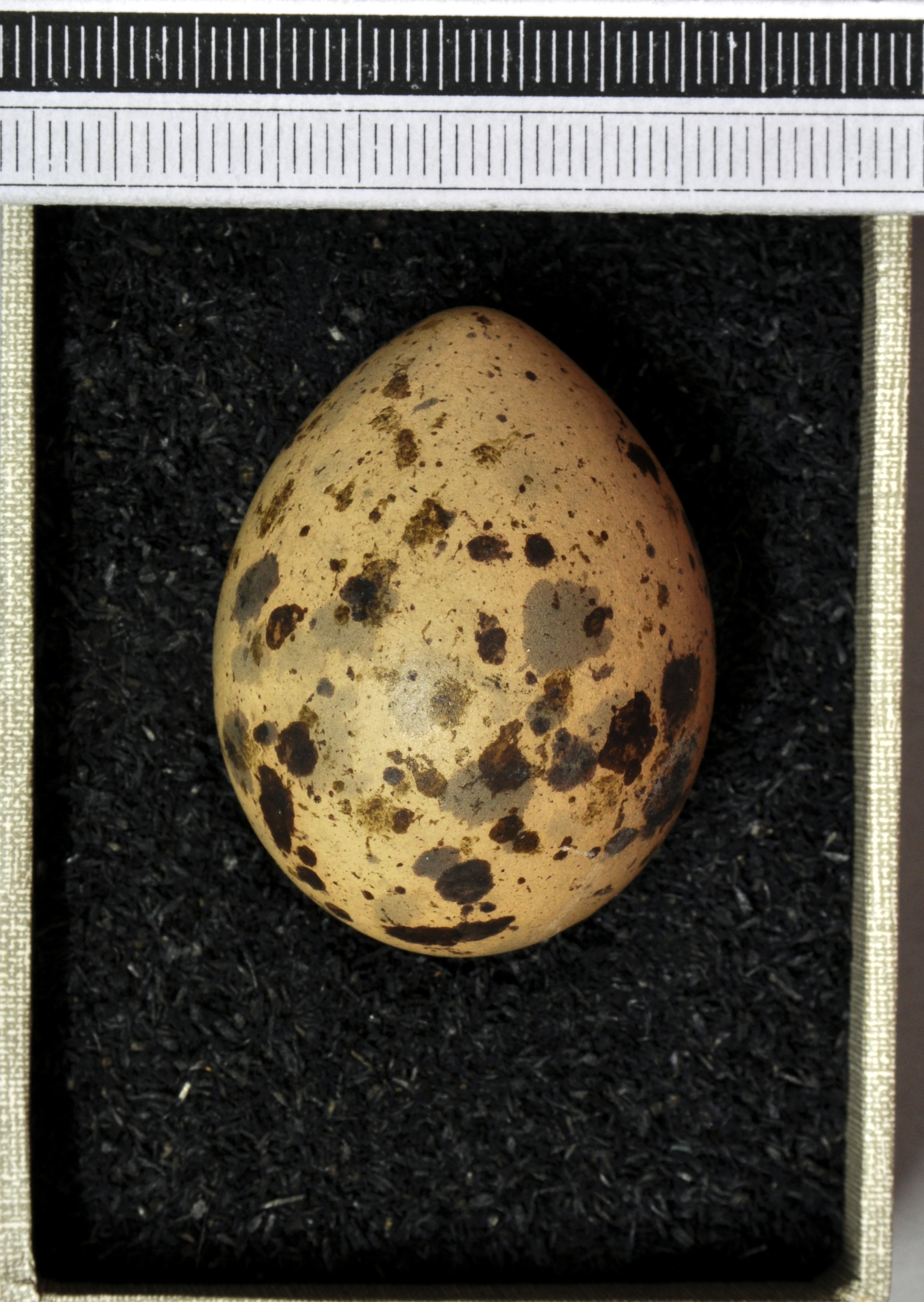
Egg, Collection Museum Wiesbaden

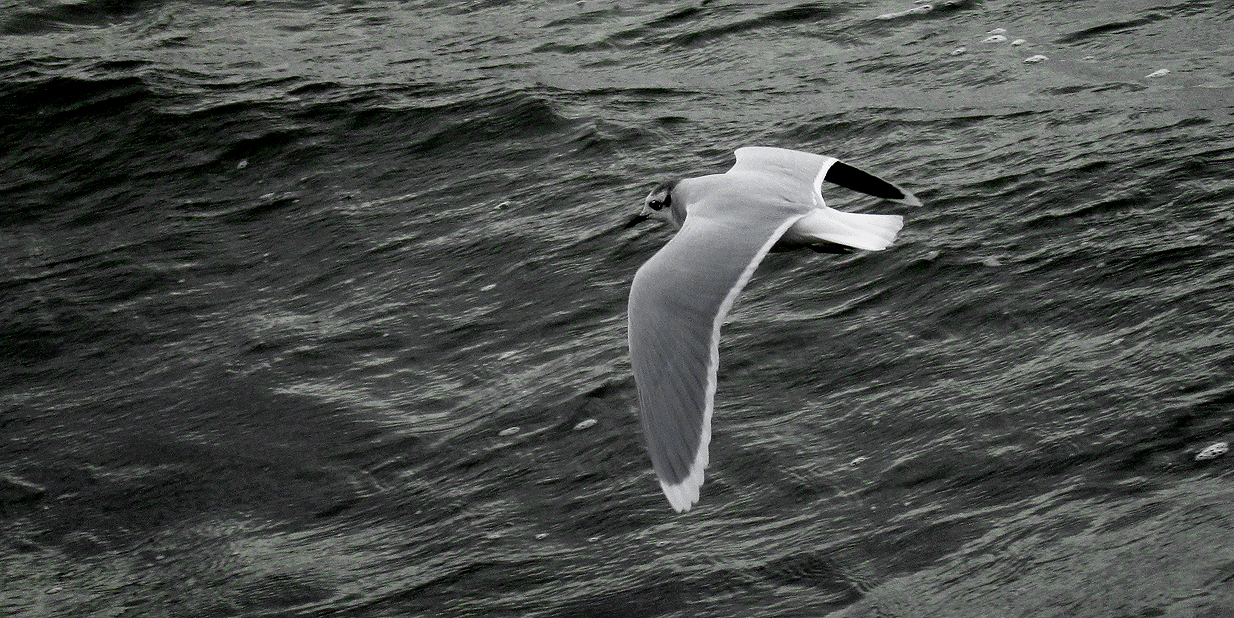
Adult in winter plumage

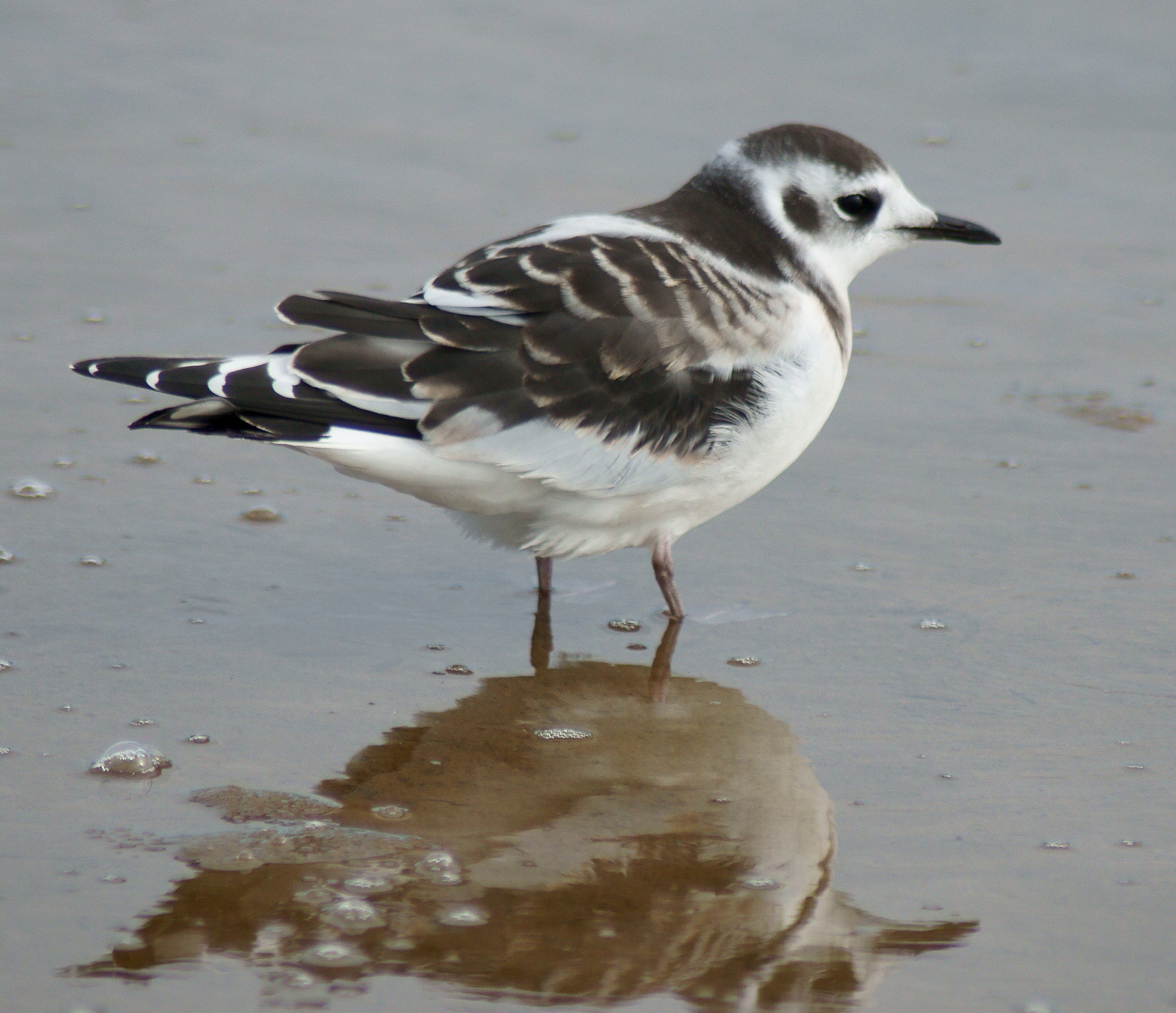
Juvenile; Yyteri, Pori, Suomi - Finland

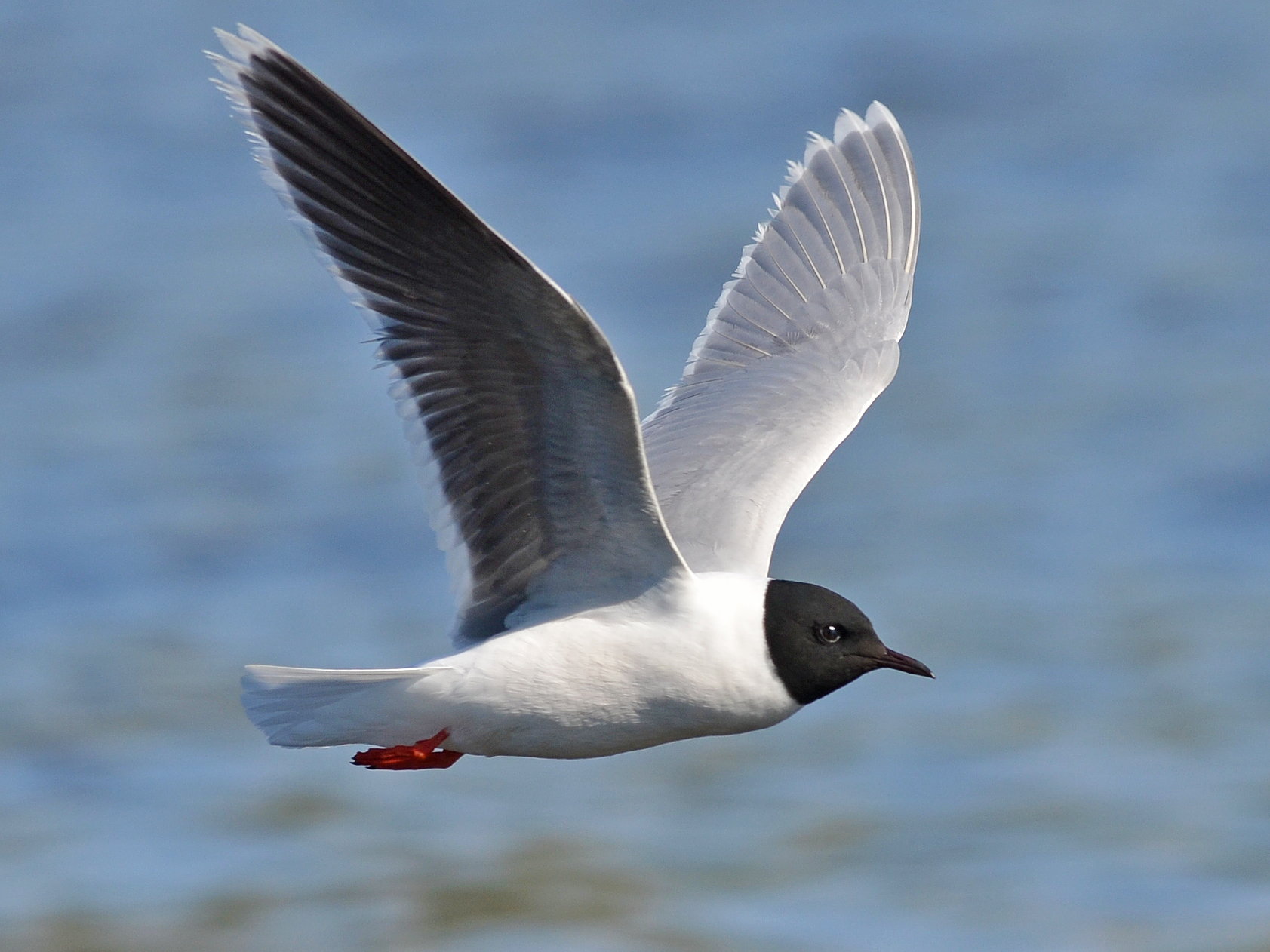
Adult Breeding plumage

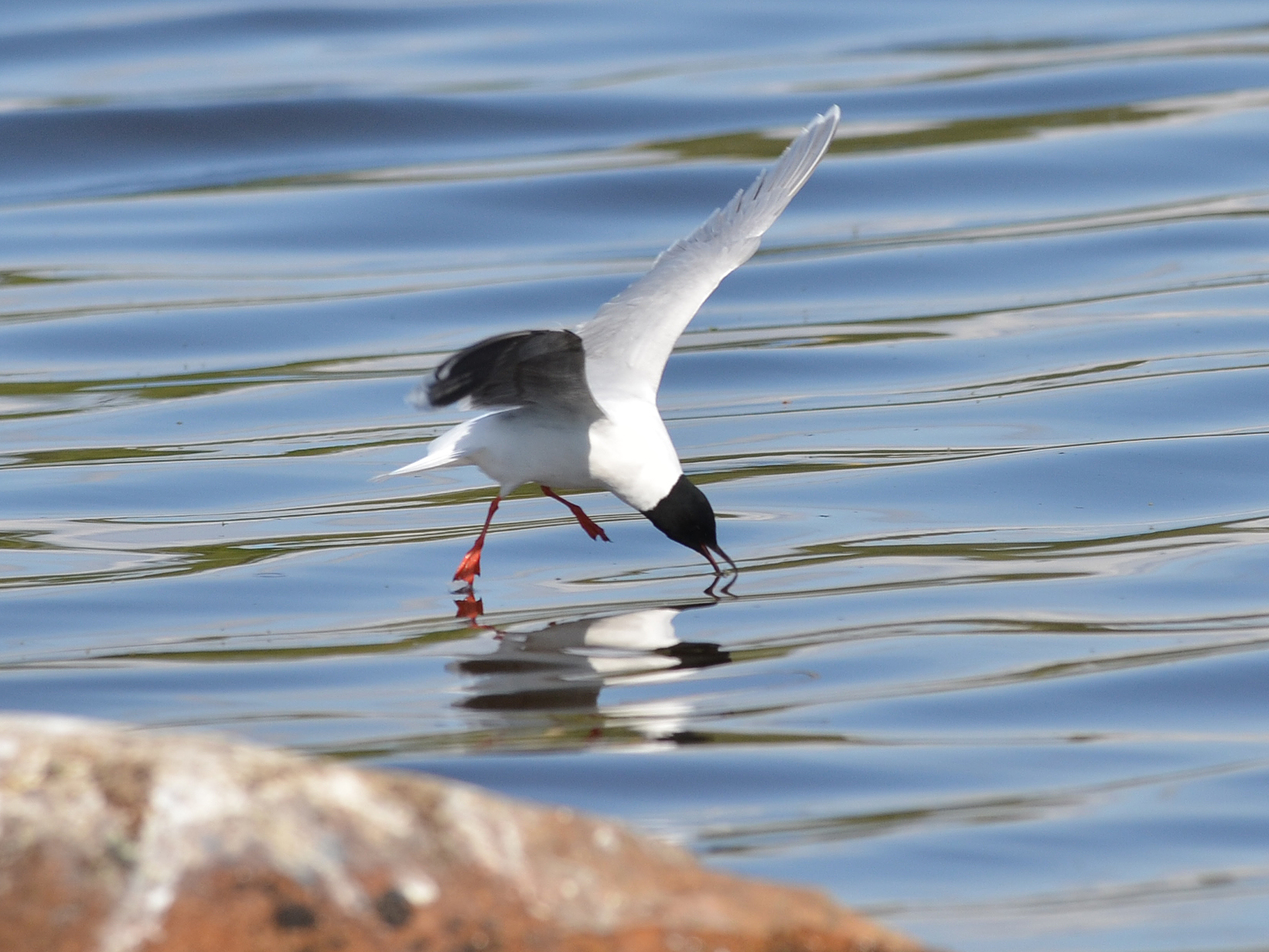
Picking food from the water surface
