= Pokhodsk =

Pokhodsk Походск Походскай (Sakha)
- Selo
- Interactive map of Pokhodsk
- Location of Pokhodsk Pokhodsk (Sakha Republic)
- Coordinates: 69°04′N 160°58′E
- Country: Russia
- Federal subject: Sakha Republic
- Administrative district: Nizhnekolymsky District
- Rural okrugSelsoviet: Pokhodsky Rural Okrug
- Founded: 1644

Population (2010 Census)
  - Total: 245
  - Estimate (2021): 197 (−19.6%)

Administrative status
  - Capital of: Pokhodsky Rural Okrug

Municipal status
  - Municipal district: Nizhnekolymsky Municipal District
  - Rural settlement: Pokhodsky Rural Settlement
  - Capital of: Pokhodsky Rural Settlement
- Time zone: UTC+11 (MSK+8)
- Postal code: 678822
- OKTMO ID: 98637424101

Pokhodsk (Russian: Походск; Yakut: Походскай) is a rural locality (a selo) and the administrative center of Pokhodsky Rural Okrug of Nizhnekolymsky District in the Sakha Republic, Russia, located 255 kilometers (158 mi) from Chersky, the administrative center of the district. Its population as of the 2010 Census was 245, of whom 128 were male and 117 female, down from 271 recorded during the 2002 Census.
