= Kolyma Lowland =

Vast region of marshes and lakes in northeastern Siberia

Kolyma Lowland Колымская низменность
- Plain
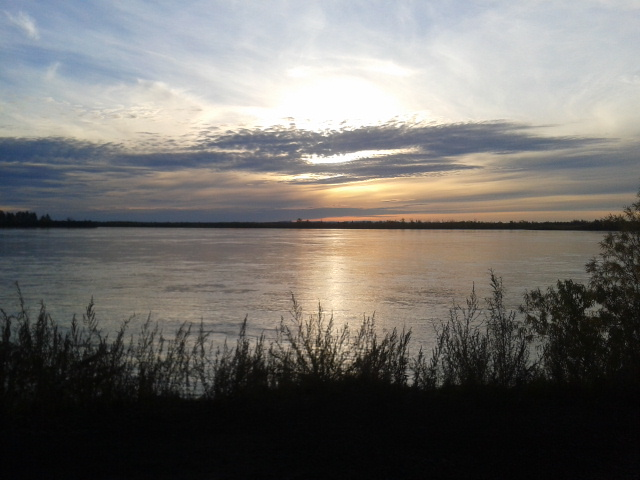
- View of the Kolyma River

- Location in Sakha, Russian Far East
- Coordinates: 69°0′N 154°0′E
- Location: Sakha Republic, Russia
- Part of: Yana-Kolyma Lowland

Area
  - Total: 170,000 km^{2} (66,000 sq mi)
- Elevation: 100 meters (330 ft)

The Kolyma Lowland (Russian: Колымская низменность) is a lowland plain in the northeastern parts of Sakha Republic in the basin of the Alazeya, Bolshaya Chukoch'ya and lower reaches of the Kolyma rivers. The lowland is formed by fluvio-lacustrine loam soil about 120 m thick. The climate is subarctic.

== Geography ==
The Kolyma Lowland stretches for 750 kilometers (470 mi) along the Kolyma River from the East Siberian Sea to the Chersky Range, between the Alazeya and Yukagir plateaus. Besides the Kolyma, other rivers in the lowland include the Alazeya, its tributary Rossokha, and the Chukochya. The average elevation of the Kolyma lowland is 100 meters (330 ft) with occasional heights, such as the 512 meters (1,680 ft) high Suor Uyata.

The Kolyma Lowland is part of the wider Yana-Kolyma system of lowlands, which include the Aby to the south of the Polousny Range and the Yana-Indigirka on the northern and western sides.

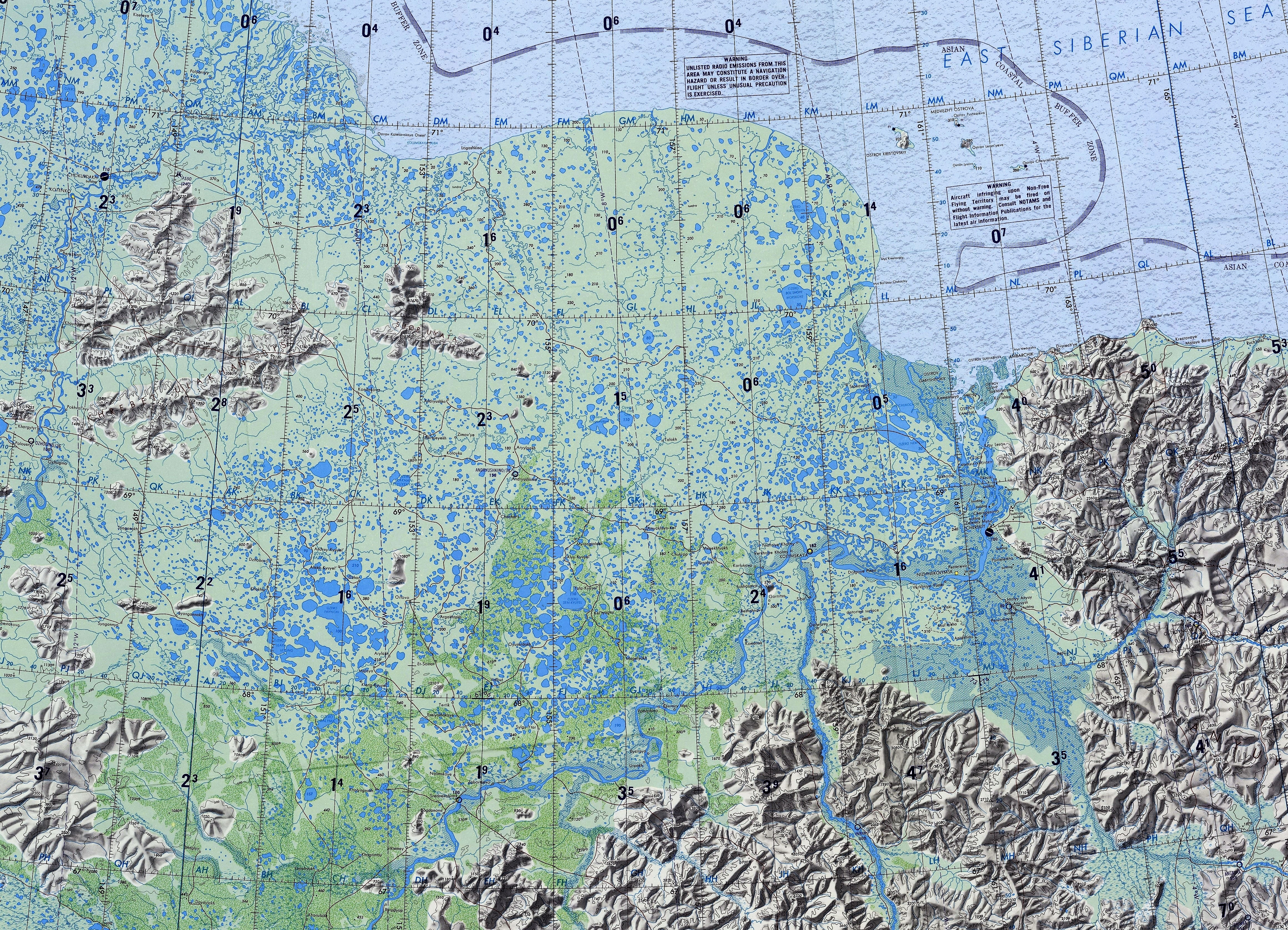
Kolyma Lowland map section

== See also ==
- Northeast Siberian coastal tundra
- Pleistocene park
