= Alazeya =

Alazeya Алазея / Алаһыай
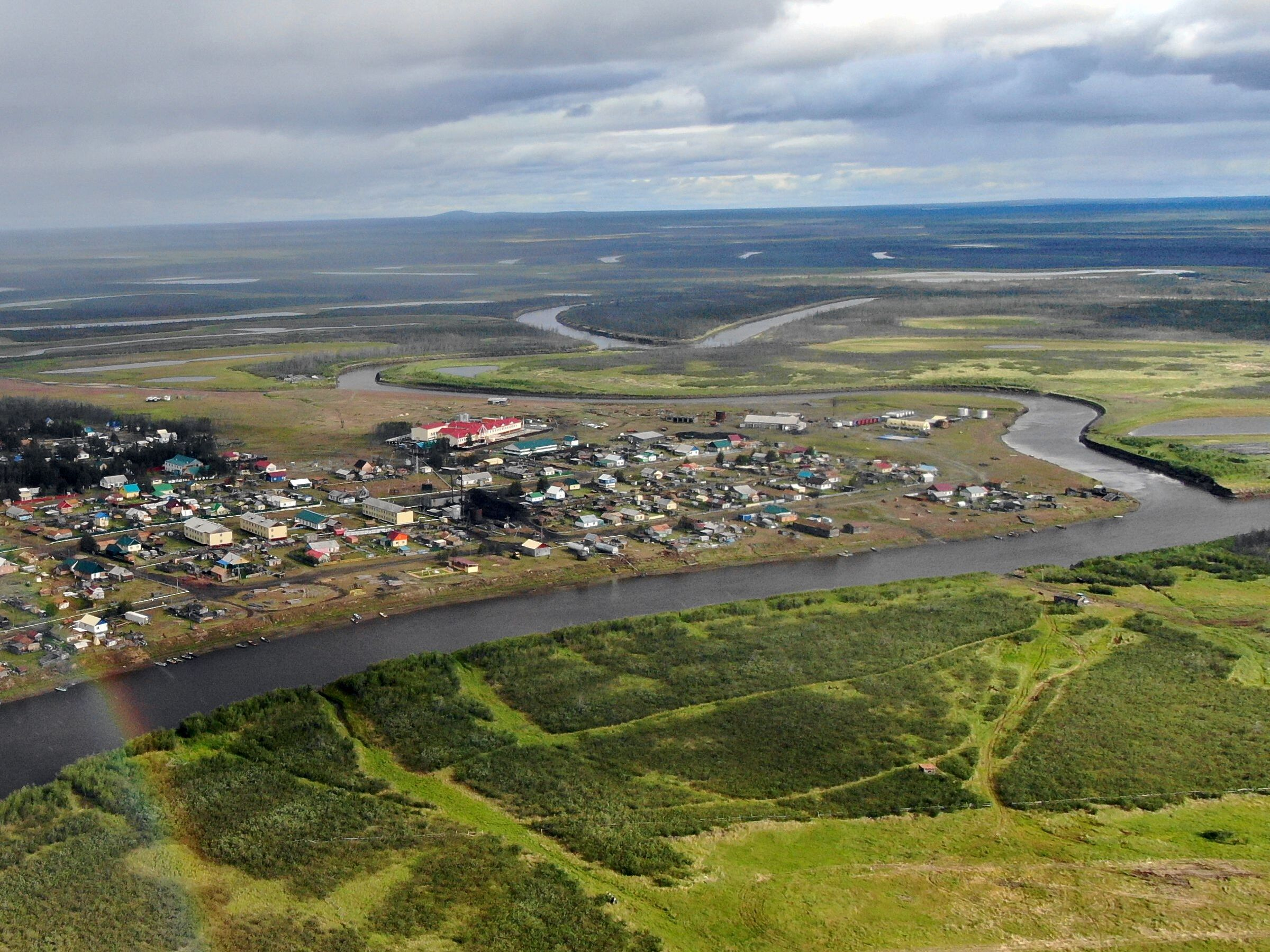
- Aerial photograph of Alazeya.

- Mouth location in Yakutia, Russia

Location
- Country: Russia
- Location: Yakutia

Physical characteristics
- Source: Confluence of the Nelkan and Kadylchan rivers
  - location: Alazeya Plateau
  - coordinates: 67°44′38″N 147°49′59″E
  - elevation: 116 m (381 ft)
- Mouth
  - location: East Siberian Sea
  - coordinates: 70°51′42″N 153°40′46″E
  - elevation: 0 m (0 ft)
- Length: 1,590 km (990 mi) (total)
- Basin size: 64,700 km^{2} (25,000 sq mi)
- Discharge
  - average: 320 m^{3}/s (11,000 cu ft/s)

The Alazeya (Russian: Алазея; Yakut: Алаһыай, romanized: Alahıay) is a river in the northeastern part of Yakutia, Russia which flows into the Arctic between the basins of the larger Indigirka to the west and the Kolyma to the east.

Mount Kisilyakh-Tas is a notable kigilyakh site on the right bank of the Alazeya River at 69°42′N 155°0′E.

== Geography ==
The river is 1,590 kilometres (990 mi) long. The area of its basin is 64,700 square kilometres (25,000 mi^{2}). The Alazeya is formed at the confluence of the Nelkan and Kadylchan rivers in the slopes of the Alazeya Plateau. It crosses roughly northwards through the tundra meandering among the flat, marshy areas of the Kolyma Lowland, part of the greater East Siberian Lowland. Finally the Alazeya drains into the Kolyma Bay of the East Siberian Sea, close to Logashkino. The river freezes in late September through early October and stays icebound until late May through early June. There are more than 24,000 lakes in its basin.

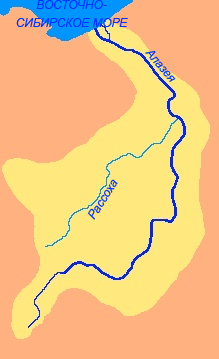
A sketch of the Alazeya basin.

=== Tributaries ===
The biggest tributaries of the Alazeya are the 790 km (490 mi) long Rassokha and 131 km (81 mi) long Buor-Yuryakh from the left, as well as the 168 km (104 mi) long Sloboda River and the 244 km (152 mi) long Buor-Yuryakh from the right.

== History ==
Dmitrii Zyryan was the first Russian to reach the Alazeya in 1641, but did not found a permanent settlement.

== See also ==
- List of rivers of Russia
