= Nizhnekolymsky District =

Nizhnekolymsky District Нижнеколымский улус (Russian)
- District

Other transcription(s)
  - Sakha: Аллараа Халыма улууhа
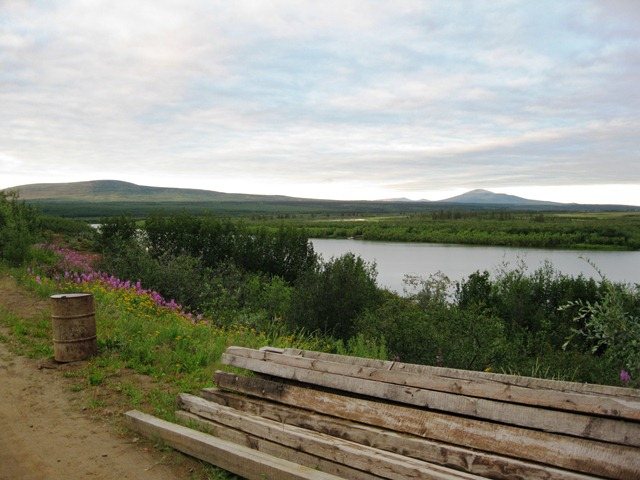
- View from Northeast Science Station, Nizhnekolymsky District

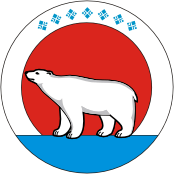
- Coat of arms
- Location of Nizhnekolymsky District in the Sakha Republic
- Coordinates: 71°25′N 136°10′E
- Country: Russia
- Federal subject: Sakha Republic
- Established: May 20, 1931
- Administrative center: Chersky

Area
  - Total: 87,100 km^{2} (33,600 sq mi)

Population (2010 Census)
  - Total: 4,664
  - Density: 0.0535/km^{2} (0.139/sq mi)
  - Urban: 61.3%
  - Rural: 38.7%

Administrative structure
  - Administrative divisions: 1 Settlements, 3 Rural okrugs
  - Inhabited localities: 1 urban-type settlements, 12 rural localities

Municipal structure
  - Municipally incorporated as: Nizhnekolymsky Municipal District
  - Municipal divisions: 1 urban settlements, 3 rural settlements
- Time zone: UTC+
- OKTMO ID: 98637000

Nizhnekolymsky District (Russian: Нижнеколы́мский улу́с; Yakut: Аллараа Халыма улууһа, romanized: Allaraa Xalıma uluuha) is an administrative and municipal district (raion, or ulus), one of the thirty-four in the Sakha Republic, Russia. It is located in the northeast of the republic and borders with Allaikhovsky District in the west, Srednekolymsky District in the south, and with Bilibinsky District of Chukotka Autonomous Okrug in the east. The area of the district is 87,100 square kilometers (33,600 sq mi). Its administrative center is the urban locality (a settlement) of Chersky. Population: 4,664 (2010 census); 5,932 (2002 Census); 13,692 (1989 Soviet census). The population of Chersky accounts for 61.3% of the district's total population.

== Geography ==
The district is washed by the East Siberian Sea in the north. The main river in the district is the Kolyma. Other rivers include the Alazeya, its tributary Rossokha, and the Chukochya. There are many lakes in the district, among them Lake Nerpichye, Lake Chukochye, Lake Bolshoye Morskoye, and Lake Ilyrgyttyn. Mount Kisilyakh-Tas is located in the district.

=== Climate ===
Average January temperature ranges from −32 °C (−26 °F) in the north to −38 °C (−36 °F) in the south and average July temperature ranges from +4 °C (39 °F) in the north to +12 °C (54 °F) in the south. Annual precipitation is 150–200 millimeters (5.9–7.9 in).

== History ==
The district was established on May 20, 1931.

== Demographics ==
As of the 2021 Census, the ethnic composition was as follows:

- Russians: 39.7%
- Yakuts: 17.6%
- Evens: 14.7%
- Chukchi: 12.2%
- Yukaghir: 10.0%
- Ukrainians: 1.5%
- Tatars: 1.0
- others: 3.3%

== Economy ==
The economy of the district is mostly based on agriculture and fishing.

== Inhabited localities ==
Municipal composition
Urban settlements	Population	Male	Female	Inhabited localities in jurisdiction
Chersky (Черский)	2857	1332 (46.6%)	1525 (53.4%)	urban-type settlement of Chersky (administrative center of the district); selo of Petushki
Rural settlements	Population	Male	Female	Rural localities in jurisdiction*
Rural National Yukagir Settlement of "Olerinsky Suktul" (Сельское национальное юкагирское поселение "Олеринский Суктул")	741	369 (49.8%)	372 (50.2%)	**selo of Andryushkino**
Pokhodsky Nasleg (Походский наслег)	255	134 (52.5%)	121 (47.5%)	**selo of Pokhodsk**; selo of Ambarchik; selo of Dve Viski; selo of Yermolovo; selo of Krestovaya; selo of Mikhalkino; selo of Nizhnekolymsk; selo of Timkino; selo of Chukochya
Khalarchinsky Nasleg (Халарчинский наслег)	811	396 (48.8%)	415 (51.2%)	**selo of Kolymskoye**

Divisional source:
Population source:
*Administrative centers are shown in bold
