= Magadan Time =

Time zone in Russia (UTC+11)

- Time zone

UTC offset
- MAGT: UTC+11:00

Current time
- 20:33, 16 June 2026 MAGT [refresh]

Observance of DST
- DST is not observed in this time zone.

Time in Russia: KALT / Kaliningrad Time / UTC+2 / (MSK−1); MSK / Moscow Time / UTC+3 / (MSK±0); SAMT / Samara Time / UTC+4 / (MSK+1); YEKT / Yekaterinburg Time / UTC+5 / (MSK+2); OMST / Omsk Time / UTC+6 / (MSK+3); KRAT / Krasnoyarsk Time / UTC+7 / (MSK+4); IRKT / Irkutsk Time / UTC+8 / (MSK+5); YAKT / Yakutsk Time / UTC+9 / (MSK+6); VLAT / Vladivostok Time / UTC+10 / (MSK+7); MAGT / Magadan Time / UTC+11 / (MSK+8); PETT / Kamchatka Time / UTC+12 / (MSK+9)

Magadan Time (MAGT) (Russian: магаданское время, romanized: magadanskoye vremya) is a time zone in Russia, named after Magadan, the administrative center of Magadan Oblast. It is 11 hours ahead of UTC (UTC+11) and 8 hours ahead of Moscow Time (MSK+8).

Between 26 October 2014 and 24 April 2016, Magadan Oblast was in UTC+10 (MSK+7), that is Vladivostok Time. During this time, the UTC+11:00 (MSK+8) time zone was named Srednekolymsk Time, and was used by only 27,000 residents in the eastern districts of the Sakha Republic and northern Kuril Islands.

The time in Magadan has been as follows:

Start date	UTC offset	MSK offset
From 1924, May 2	UTC+10:00	MSK+8
From 1930, Jun 21	UTC+11:00	MSK+8
From 1991, Mar 31	UTC+10:00 with DST	MSK+8
From 1992, Jan 19	UTC+11:00 with DST	MSK+8
From 2011, Mar 27	UTC+12:00	MSK+8
From 2014, Oct 26	UTC+10:00	MSK+7
From 2016, Apr 24	UTC+11:00	MSK+8

== Areas on Magadan Time ==
- Magadan Oblast
- Sakhalin Oblast

- Eastern districts of the Sakha Republic:

- Abyysky
- Allaikhovsky
- Momsky

- Nizhnekolymsky
- Srednekolymsky
- Verkhnekolymsky

== IANA time zone database ==
In the zone.tab of the IANA time zone database, the zones with the same current offset are:

c.c.	Coordinates	Timezone name	Comments	UTC offset
RU	+5934+15048	Asia/Magadan	MSK+08 – Magadan	+11:00
RU	+4658+14242	Asia/Sakhalin	MSK+08 – Sakhalin Island	+11:00
RU	+6728+15343	Asia/Srednekolymsk	MSK+08 – Sakha (E), N Kuril Is	+11:00

== See also ==
- Time in Russia
