= Chersky (urban-type settlement) =

Urban locality in Sakha Republic, Russia

Chersky Черский
- Urban-type settlement

Other transcription(s)
  - Yakut: Черскэй
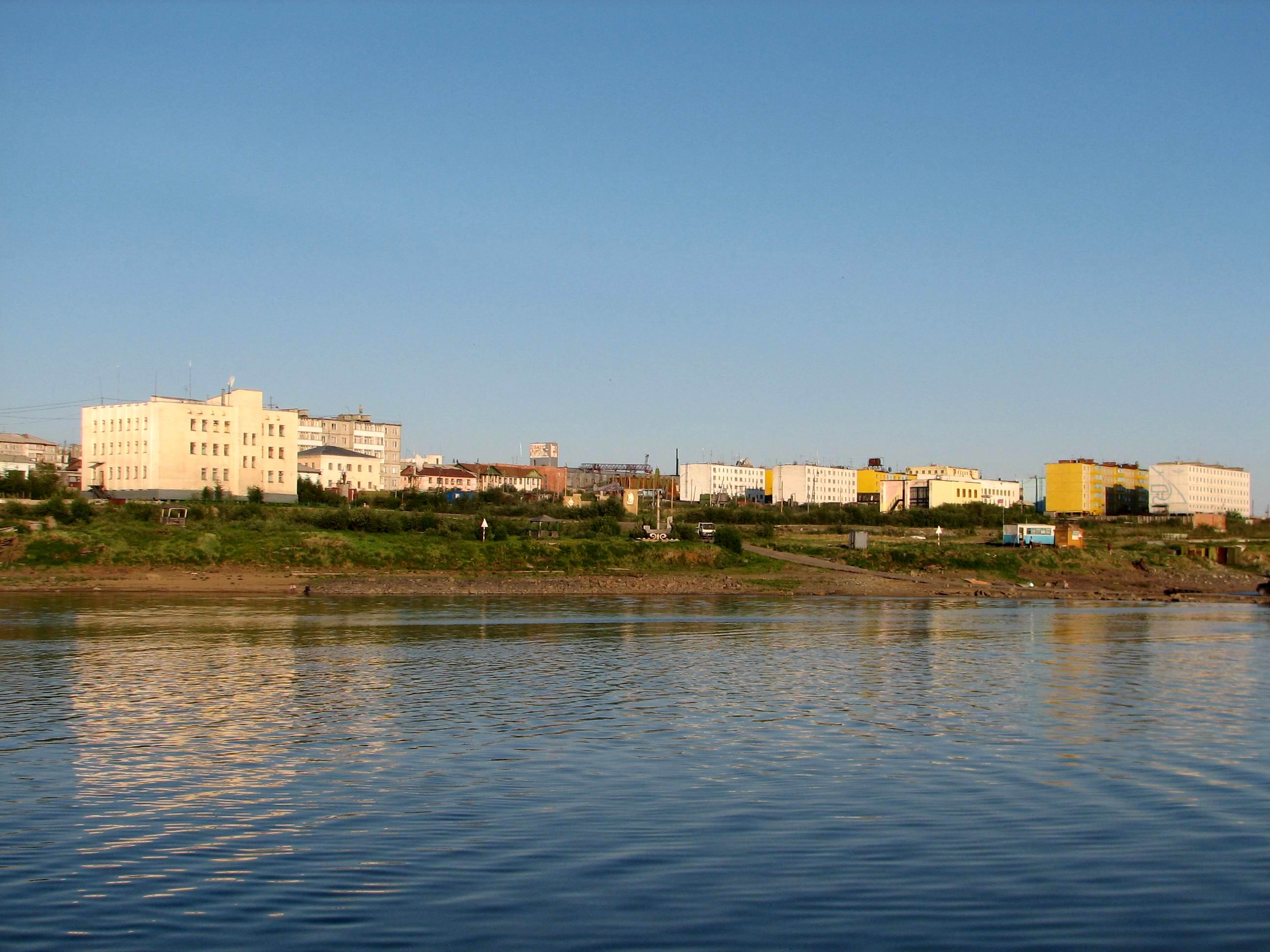
- Interactive map of Chersky
- Location of Chersky Chersky (Sakha Republic)
- Coordinates: 68°46′N 161°20′E
- Country: Russia
- Federal subject: Sakha Republic
- Administrative district: Nizhnekolymsky District
- SettlementSelsoviet: Settlement of Chersky
- Founded: 1931
- Urban-type settlement status since: 1963
- Elevation: 10 m (33 ft)

Population (2010 Census)
  - Total: 2,857
  - Estimate (2023): 2,641 (−7.6%)

Administrative status
  - Capital of: Nizhnekolymsky District, Settlement of Chersky

Municipal status
  - Municipal district: Nizhnekolymsky Municipal District
  - Urban settlement: Chersky Urban Settlement
  - Capital of: Nizhnekolymsky Municipal District, Chersky Urban Settlement
- Time zone: UTC+11 (MSK+8)
- Postal code: 678829–678831
- OKTMO ID: 98637151051

Chersky population
- 2010 Census: 2,857
- 2002 Census: 3,832
- 1989 Census: 11,176
- 1979 Census: 9,726

Chersky (also anglicized Cherskiy) (Russian: Че́рский; Yakut: Черскэй, Çerskey) is an urban locality (an urban-type settlement) and the administrative center of Nizhnekolymsky District of the Sakha Republic, Russia, located on the Kolyma River, 1,920 kilometers (1,190 mi) east from Yakutsk, the capital of the republic. As of the 2010 Census, its population was 2,857.

It was previously known as Nizhniye Kresty (until 1963). In 1989 the population of Chersky peaked on 11,176 inhabitants; however, like most Soviet settlements in the Arctic, it has been largely abandoned after the dissolution of the Soviet Union as most of its residents left. A similar depopulation happened in Magadan Oblast and Chukotka, and in lighter scale in the Russian Far East.

== History ==
It was founded as Nizhniye Kresty (Нижние Кресты) in 1931. In 1963, it was granted urban-type settlement status and renamed Chersky, after Jan Czerski, a Polish geographer who organized several expeditions in the surrounding area in the 1880s. From the 1950s to the early 1990s, Chersky hosted logistical wing for drifting ice stations, which ran a supply route via Zhokhov Island.

== Administrative and municipal status ==
Within the framework of administrative divisions, the urban-type settlement of Chersky serves as the administrative center of Nizhnekolymsky District. As an administrative division, it is, together with one rural locality (the selo of Petushki), incorporated within Nizhnekolymsky District as the Settlement of Chersky. As a municipal division, the Settlement of Chersky is incorporated within Nizhnekolymsky Municipal District as Chersky Urban Settlement.

== Economy ==
It is served by the Chersky Airport. Chersky is the home of the Northeast Science Station. In 1981, Sergey Zimov established here the Pleistocene Park, a place for studies of global warming, pleistocene ecology, and permafrost.

== Climate ==
Despite being located inside the Arctic circle, Chersky has a subarctic climate (Köppen climate classification Dfc). Although severe, the climate sees less extremes in temperature than localities such as Yakutsk, Oymyakon and Verkhoyansk that are located more south, but further away from ocean. Summers are generally cool, although temperature may occasionally rise above 30 °C. Unusual for such a cold place, temperatures above 0 °C have been recorded in every month of the year.

Climate data for Chersky
Month	Jan	Feb	Mar	Apr	May	Jun	Jul	Aug	Sep	Oct	Nov	Dec	Year
Record high °C (°F)	3.1 (37.6)	1.3 (34.3)	3.4 (38.1)	10.1 (50.2)	27.0 (80.6)	32.2 (90.0)	35.0 (95.0)	29.7 (85.5)	23.7 (74.7)	11.7 (53.1)	5.0 (41.0)	5.1 (41.2)	35.0 (95.0)
Mean daily maximum °C (°F)	−29.3 (−20.7)	−28.6 (−19.5)	−20.1 (−4.2)	−10.1 (13.8)	4.0 (39.2)	15.2 (59.4)	17.3 (63.1)	13.8 (56.8)	6.3 (43.3)	−7.6 (18.3)	−20.5 (−4.9)	−27.7 (−17.9)	−7.3 (18.9)
Daily mean °C (°F)	−32.5 (−26.5)	−31.6 (−24.9)	−24.1 (−11.4)	−14.6 (5.7)	−0.1 (31.8)	10.4 (50.7)	12.6 (54.7)	9.5 (49.1)	2.9 (37.2)	−10.4 (13.3)	−23.7 (−10.7)	−30.9 (−23.6)	−11.0 (12.1)
Mean daily minimum °C (°F)	−36.0 (−32.8)	−35.3 (−31.5)	−29.4 (−20.9)	−21.1 (−6.0)	−5.5 (22.1)	4.9 (40.8)	7.4 (45.3)	5.1 (41.2)	−0.4 (31.3)	−13.7 (7.3)	−27.2 (−17.0)	−34.2 (−29.6)	−15.4 (4.2)
Record low °C (°F)	−52.2 (−62.0)	−53.9 (−65.0)	−48.0 (−54.4)	−40.0 (−40.0)	−30.0 (−22.0)	−8.0 (17.6)	0.0 (32.0)	−11.2 (11.8)	−15.0 (5.0)	−33.8 (−28.8)	−43.9 (−47.0)	−49.8 (−57.6)	−53.9 (−65.0)
Average precipitation mm (inches)	23 (0.9)	13 (0.5)	13 (0.5)	18 (0.7)	25 (1.0)	51 (2.0)	61 (2.4)	71 (2.8)	56 (2.2)	41 (1.6)	25 (1.0)	18 (0.7)	415 (16.3)
Average precipitation days	12.2	9.2	10.9	8.2	9.2	8.4	10.0	11.3	14.8	17.9	14.3	14.9	141.3
Average relative humidity (%)	86.7	83.9	81.4	76.4	74.8	71.2	76.9	82.4	84.2	88.9	89.4	86.9	81.9
Source: http://www.weatherbase.com/weather/weather.php3?s=32152
