= Animals in the Bible =

Over 120 species of animals are mentioned in the Bible, ordered alphabetically in this article by English vernacular name. Animals mentioned in the Old Testament will be listed with their Hebrew name, while those mentioned in the New Testament will be listed with their Greek names. This list includes names of mythical creatures such as the griffin, lamia, siren and unicorn, which have been applied to real animals in some older translations of the Bible due to misunderstandings or educational prejudices of the Greek and Latin translators.

== Natural history of the Holy Land ==
The fauna of the Holy Land (modern-day Israel and Palestine) has significantly changed since Biblical times, with many animals mentioned in the Bible being locally extinct or endangered in modern times. For example, the aurochs (the most likely referent of the Hebrew רְאֵם rəʾēm) is globally extinct, being extinct in the Levant by the time of the Babylonian captivity. Locally extinct species include lions, leopards and bears.

The frequency of references to given animals may be used to date parts of the Bible. For example, recent excavations in the Timna Valley discovered what may be the earliest camel bones found in Israel or even outside the Arabian peninsula, dating to around 930 BCE. This is seen as evidence that the stories of Abraham, Joseph, Jacob and Esau were written after this time. However, other scholars argue that camels were already domesticated in Mesopotamia by the early second millennium BCE and that their presence in the patriarchal narratives is not anachronistic.

The Bible mentions animals from varying regions of the Middle East. The ostrich, for instance, a denizen of the torrid regions, and the camel, of the waterless districts around Palestine, are mentioned side by side with the roebuck and deer of the woody summits of Lebanon. This variety, greater probably in Palestine than in any other country in the same latitude, is attributed to the great extremes of elevation and temperature in this small area. Palestinian fauna is not as rich today as it was during the Biblical times. The land is barren today but was well wooded when the Bible was written, especially on the hills east of the Jordan River.

== Biblical taxonomy ==
Although no regular classification is to be sought for in the Bible, animal creation is there practically divided into four classes, often called kinds, according to the four different modes of locomotion. The first class, the beasts, in the Biblical parlance, includes all large, walking animals, with the exception of the amphibia, such small animals as moles, mice and the like, and humans as they were not classified as animals.

Beasts are divided into cattle, or domesticated (behemoth in the strict sense), and beasts of the field, i.e. wild animals. The fowls, which constitute the second class, include not only the birds, but also "all things that fly", even if they "go upon four feet", as the different kinds of locusts. Of the many "living beings that swim in the water" no particular species is mentioned; the "great whales" are set apart in that class, while the rest are divided according to whether or not they had fins or scales (Leviticus 11:9, 10).

The reptiles, or "creeping things", form the fourth class. References to this class are relatively few. The "creeping things" include not only reptiles, but all short-legged animals or insects which seem to crawl rather than to walk, such as moles, lizards, etc. From a religious viewpoint, all these animals are divided into two classes, clean and unclean, according to whether they can, or cannot, be eaten.

== List of animals ==
In the following list D.V. stands for Douay Version, A.V. and R.V. for Authorized and Revised Version respectively.

=== A ===
- Addax — a now critically-endangered species of antelope with twisted horns; the most likely referent of the Hebrew דִּישׁוֹן (dîšôn), translated as "pygarg" in the King James Version (KJV) and D.V. (Deuteronomy 14:5).
- Adder — the translation of four Hebrew words for types of snakes in the A.V..
- Ant (נְמָלָה nəmālāh) — Allusion are made to ants' habits of storing food in Proverbs 6:6 and 30:25.
- Antelope — four species are mentioned in the Bible:
  1. דִּישׁוֹן, dîšôn — the addax
  2. צְּבִ֖י, ṣəb̲î — translated as "roe" in Deuteronomy 12:15 of the DV and KJV; most likely the gazelle (specifically the Dorcas gazelle, Gazella dorcas). צְּבִ֖י means "gazelle" in Modern Hebrew.
  3. תְא֥וֹ, ṯəʾô — in Deuteronomy 14:5 of the D.V., translated as "wild goat", and as "wild ox" in Isaiah 51:20 of this version. This term seems to have referred to the now-extinct bubal hartebeest (Alcelaphus buselaphus buselaphus).
  4. יַחְמ֑וּר, yaḥmûr — in Deuteronomy 14:5; cognate with the Arabic word for roebuck (Capreolus capreolus) and Arabian oryx (Oryx leucoryx).
- Ape (קוֹף qôp̲) — Apes are mentioned alongside gold, silver, ivory, and peacocks among the precious things imported by Solomon from Tarshish (1 Kings 10:22; 2 Chronicles 9:21). "Ape" in the KJV referred to what is called an Old World monkey today. "Apes" in the modern colloquial sense, were known of only later.
- Asp — This word, which occurs eleven times in D.V., stands for four Hebrew names:
  1. פֶתֶן p̲et̲en (Deuteronomy 32:33; Job 20:14 and 20:16; 16; Isaiah 11:8). From several allusions both to its deadly venom (Deuteronomy 32:33), and to its use by serpent-charmers (Ps. 58 (Vulgate: Ps. 57):5, 6), it appears that the cobra (naja aspis) is most probably signified. Safely to step upon its body, or even linger by the hole where it coils itself, is manifestly a sign of God's particular protection (Ps. 91 (Vulgate: Ps. 90):13; Isaiah 11:8). Sophar, one of Job's friends, speaks of the wicked as sucking the venom of péthén, in punishment whereof the food he takes shall be turned within him into the gall of this poisonous reptile (Job 20:14, 16).
  2. עַכְשׁוּב ʿak̲šûb̲, mentioned only once in the Hebrew Bible, namely Psalm 140, but manifestly alluded to in Psalm 13:3, and Romans 3:13, seems to have been one of the most highly poisonous kinds of viper, perhaps the toxicoa, also called echis arenicola or scytale of the Pyramids, very common in Syria and North Africa.
  3. שַׁחַל šaḥal is also found only once to signify a snake, Ps. 91 (Vulgate: Ps. 90): 13; but what particular kind of snake we are unable to determine. The word Sháhál (usually meaning "lion") might possibly, owing to some copyist's mistake, have crept into the place of another name now impossible to restore.
  4. צֶפַע ṣep̲aʿ (Isaiah 59:5), "the hisser", generally rendered by basilisk in ID.V. and in ancient translations, the latter sometimes calling it regulus. This snake was deemed so deadly that, according to the common saying, its hissing alone, even its look, was fatal. It was probably a small viper, perhaps a cerastes, possibly the daboia zanthina, according to Cheyne.
- Ass — The ass (male חֲמוֹר ḥămôr, female אָתוֹן ʾāt̲ôn, juvenile עַיִר ʿayir) has always enjoyed a marked favour above all other beasts of burden in the Bible. This is evidenced by more than 130 mentions of this animal, and by the number of words in the Hebrew vocabulary used to designate the ass, by colour, sex, age, and so forth. Of these various names the most common is חֲמוֹר. White asses, more rare, were also more appreciated and reserved for the use of the nobles (Judges 5:10). Asses have always been an important item in the resources of the Eastern peoples, and we are repeatedly told in the Bible about the herds of these animals owned by the patriarchs (Genesis 12:16; 30:43; 36:24, etc.), and later by wealthy Israelites (1 Samuel 9:3; 1 Chronicles 27:30, etc.). Hence the several regulations brought forth by Israel's lawgiver on this subject: the neighbour's ass should not be coveted (Exodus 20:17); moreover, should the neighbour's stray ass be found, it should be taken care of, and its owner assisted in tending this part of his herd (Deuteronomy 22:3, 4).

The ass serves in the East for many purposes. Its even gait and sure-footedness, so well suited to the rough paths of the Holy Land, made it at all times the most popular of all the animals for riding in those hilly regions (Genesis 22:3; Luke 19:30). Neither was it ridden only by the common people, but also by persons of the highest rank (Judges 5:10; 10:4; 2 Samuel 17:23; 19:26, etc.). No wonder therefore that Jesus, about to come triumphantly to Jerusalem, commanded His disciples to bring Him an ass and her colt; no lesson of humility, as is sometimes asserted, but the affirmation of the peaceful character of His kingdom should be sought there. Although the Scripture speaks of "saddling" the ass, usually no saddle was used by the rider. A cloth was spread upon the back of the ass and fastened by a strap was all the equipment. Upon this cloth the rider sat with a servant usually walking alongside. Should a family journey, the women and children would ride the asses, attended by the father (Exodus 4:20). This mode of traveling has been popularized by Christian painters, who copied the eastern customs in their representations of the Holy Family's flight to Egypt.

Scores of passages in the Bible allude to asses carrying burdens. The Gospels, at least in the Greek text, speak of millstones run by asses (Matthew 18:6, Mark 9:41; Luke 17:2); Josephus and the Egyptian monuments teach us that this animal was used for threshing wheat. Finally, we repeatedly read in the Old Testament of asses hitched to a plough (Deuteronomy 22:10; Isaiah 30:24, etc.), and in reference to this custom, the Law forbade ploughing with an ox and an ass together (Deuteronomy 22:10). From Is., 21:7, confirmed by the statements of Greek writers, we learn that part of the cavalry force in the Persian army rode donkeys. We should perhaps understand from IV K., vii, 7, that the Syrian armies followed the same practice; but no such custom seems to have ever prevailed among the Hebrews. With them the ass was essentially for peaceful use, the emblem of peace, as the horse was the symbol of war. The flesh of the donkey was unclean and forbidden by the Law. In some particular circumstances, however, no law could prevail over necessity, and we read that during Joram's reign, when Ben-hadad besieged Samaria, the famine was so extreme in this city, that the head of an ass was sold for 120 pieces of silver (IV K., vi, 25).

- Ass, colt — This is more specially the symbol of peace and meek obedience (John 12:15, πῶλον ὄνου pōlon onou).
- Ass, wild, corresponds in the Old Testament to two words, פֶרֶא p̲ereʾ and עָרוֹד ʿārôd̲. Whether these two names originally referred to different species, or are respectively Hebrew and Aramaic words for the same animal, is uncertain. Both signify one of the wildest and most untamable animals. In Modern Hebrew, פֶרֶא is used for the Asiatic wild ass, while עָרוֹד is used for the African wild ass. Its strength joined to its nimbleness and love of freedom made it a fit symbol for the first born son of Abraham who like Joseph was separated from his father and like Joseph became a great leader Ismael [gen;17;20] (Genesis 16:12). The Asiatic wild ass has been successfully reintroduced to the Negev Desert following its extinction there in the early 20th century.
- Attacus (Leviticus 11:22) — Instead of this Latin word, the A.V. reads bald-locust. According to the tradition enshrined in the Talmud, a locust with a very long smooth head (Truxalis spp.) is probably signified. The Hebrew word is סָלְעָם solʿām.
- Aurochs, or wild ox (Bos primigenius) — the most likely original referent of the Hebrew word rəʾēm (רְאֵם). The word is translated as "rhinoceros" (Numbers 23:22; 24:8; Deuteronomy 33:17; Job 39:9, 10) or "unicorn" (Psalm 22:21; 29:6; 92:10; Isaiah 34:7) in older translations of the Bible such as the D.V. and the KJV. The animal certainly had two horns, suggested by Psalm 22:21 and Deut. 33:17, where its horns represent the two tribes of Ephraim and Manasseh. That, moreover, it was akin to the domestic ox is shown from such parallelisms as we find in Psalm 24:6, where we read, according to the critical editions of the Hebrew text: "The voice of Yahweh makes Lebanon skip like a bullock, and Sirion like a young rəʾēm"; or Is.,34:7: "And the rəʾēm shall go down with them, and the bulls with the mighty"; and still more convincingly by such implicit descriptions as that of Job 39:9, 10: "Shall the rəʾēm be willing to serve thee, or will he stay at thy crib? Canst thou bind the rəʾēm with thy thong to plough, or will he break the clods of the valleys after thee?" These references will be very clear, the last especially, once we admit the rəʾēm is an almost untamable wild ox, which one would try in vain to submit to the same work as its domestic kin. Hence there is very little doubt that in all the above-mentioned places the word aurochs should be substituted for rhinoceros and unicorn. The aurochs is for the sacred poets a familiar emblem of untamed strength and ferocity. It is now extinct.

In Modern Hebrew, רְאֵם refers to oryxes.

=== B ===
- Baboon — considered by some to be the שָׂעִיר śāʿîr (literally "hairy") mentioned in Isaiah 13:21 and 34:14, but it is very doubtful whether baboons ever lived in the Holy Land. שָׂעִיר refers to scops owls in Modern Hebrew.
- Badger — the translation of תַּחַשׁ (taḥaš) in older translations of the Bible such as the A.V.. The skins of taḥašim are said to be used for the outer coverings of the tabernacle and of the several pieces of its furniture and utensils and tools. תַּחַשׁ is interpreted as a color (violet) in some translations, such as the D.V. - see Exodus 25:5; 26:14; 35:7, 23; 36:19; 39:34; 4:6, 8, 10, 11, 12, 14, 25; Ezekiel 16:10. Badgers are found in the Holy Land. 19th- and early 20th century scholars popularised the idea that תַּחַשׁ referred to the dugong, which can be found in the Red Sea and whose skin was traditionally used by Bedouins for the purposes mentioned in the Bible. However, both the "badger" and "dugong" interpretations contradict Leviticus 11:10 and Leviticus 11:27, which prohibit contact with the carcasses of aquatic animals without fins and scales, and those of animals with paws, respectively. Strong's Concordance suggests תַּחַשׁ is a loanword referring to a clean animal with fur, probably a species of antelope. Yet other interpretations of תַּחַשׁ are "blue-processed skins" (Navigating the Bible II) and "(blue-)beaded skins" (Anchor Bible).
- Basilisk — occurs in the D.V. as a translation of several Hebrew names of snakes:
  1. פֶתֶן p̲et̲en (Psalms 90:13) - translated as "asp" in the KJV
  2. צֶפַע ṣep̲aʿ and Cíphe 'ônî (Proverbs 23:32; Isaiah 11:8 and 14:29; 8:17)
  3. 'éphe'éh (Isaiah 59:5, a kind of snake whose identity is uncertain
  4. flying sãrãph (Isaiah 14:29; 30:6), a winged serpent (?)
- Bat — עֲטַלֵּף (ʿăṭallēp̲) in Hebrew; one of the unclean flying animals (per Leviticus 11:19; Deuteronomy 14:18). There are 14 species of bat in the Holy Land.
- Bear — The bear (דֹּב dōb̲) spoken of in the Bible is the Syrian brown bear, which is now extinct in the Levant. Bears were highly feared on account of their ferocious and destructive instincts; to dare one was accordingly a mark of uncommon courage (1 Samuel 17:34–36). Its terror-striking roars and its fierceness, especially when robbed of its cubs, are repeatedly alluded to.
- Beast, wild — The expression occurs twice in the D.V., but much oftener in the A.V., and R. V., where it is in several places a substitute for the awkward "beast of the field", a translation of the Hebrew phrase used to refer generically to wild animals. The first time we read of "wild beasts" in the D.V., it fairly stands for the Hebrew word zîz [Ps. lxxix (Hebr., lxxx), 14], albeit the singular "wild beast" is a clumsy translation. The same Hebrew word in Ps. xlix, 11, at least for consistency's sake, should have been rendered in the same manner; "the beauty of the field" must consequently be corrected into "wild beast". In Is., xiii, 21, "wild beasts" is an equivalent for the Hebr. Ciyyîm, i. e. denizens of the desert. This word in different places has been translated in diverse manners: demons (Isaiah 34:14), dragons (Psalm 73:14; Jeremiah 1:39); it possibly refers to the hyena.
- Bee (דְּבוֹרָה dəb̲ôrāh) — Israel, according to Scripture, is a land flowing with honey (Exodus 3:8). Its dry climate, its rich abundance, and variety of aromatic flowers, and its limestone rocks render it particularly adapted for bees. No wonder then that honey bees, both wild and hived, abound there. All the different species known by the names of Bombus, Nomia, Andrena, Osmia, Megachile, Anthophora, are widely spread throughout the country. The hived honey bee of Israel, Apis fasciata, belongs to a variety slightly different from ours, characterized by yellow stripes on the abdomen. Wild bees are said to live not only in rocks [Ps. lxxx (Hebr., lxxxi), 17], but in hollow trees (1 Samuel 14:25), even in dried carcasses (Judges 14:8). Syrian and Egyptian hives are made of a mash of clay and straw for coolness. In Old Testament times, honey was an article of export (Genesis 43:11; Ezekiel 27:17). Bees are spoken of in Bible as a term of comparison for a numerous army relentlessly harassing their enemies. Debôrah, the Hebrew name for bee, was a favourite name for women.
- Beetle, given by A.V. (Leviticus 11:22) as an equivalent for Hebrew, árbéh (אַרְבֶּה), does not meet the requirements of the context: "Hath the legs behind longer wherewith it hoppeth upon the earth", any more than the bruchus of D.V., some species of locust, Locusta migratoria being very likely intended.
- Behemoth (בְּהֵמוֹת ḇəhêmōṯ) is generally translated as "great beasts"; in its wider signification it includes all mammals living on earth, but in the stricter sense is applied to domesticated quadrupeds at large. However, in Job 40:15, where it is left untranslated and considered a proper name, it indicates a particular animal. The description of this animal has long puzzled the commentators. Many of them now admit that it represents the hippopotamus; it might possibly correspond as well to the rhinoceros.
- Bird — No other classification of birds than into clean and unclean is given. The Jews, before the Babylonian captivity, had no domestic poultry except pigeons. Although many birds are mentioned, there occur few allusions to their habits. Their instinct of migration, the snaring or netting them, and the caging of song birds are referred to. See also § Fowl.
- Bird, dyed — So does the English version, Jer. 12:9, wrongly interpret the Hebrew 'áyit (עַיִט). which means beast of prey, sometimes also bird of prey or vulture.
- Bird, singing — This singing bird of Zephaniah 2:14, according to the D.V., owes its origin to a mistranslation of the original, which most probably should be read: "And their voice shall sing at the window"; unless by a mistake of some scribe, the word qôl, voice, has been substituted for the name of some particular bird.
- Birds, speckled, Hebrew tsāḇūa‘ (צָב֤וּעַ, Jeremiah 12:9). A much discussed translation. The interpretation of the English versions, however meaningless it may seem to some, is supported by the Targum, the Syriac, and St. Jerome. In spite of these authorities many modern scholars prefer to use the word hyena, given by the Septuagint and confirmed by Sirach, xiii, 22 as well as by the Arabic (dábúh) and rabbinical Hebrew (çebhôá'), names of the hyena.
- Bittern — a shy, solitary, wading bird related to the heron and inhabiting the recesses of swamps, where its startling, booming cry at night gives a frightening impression of desolation. In the D.V., bittern stands for Hebr. qã'ãth (קָאַת, Leviticus 11:18; Isaiah 34:11; Zephaniah 2:14), although by some inconsistency the same Hebrew word is rendered Deuteronomy 14:17, by cormorant, and Ps. ci (Hebr., cii), 7, by pelican. The pelican meets all the requirements of all the passages where qã'ãth is mentioned, and would perhaps be a better translation than bittern.
- Blast certainly designates, Deuteronomy 28:42, a voracious insect; the Hebrew צְלָצַל tsəlātsal, "chirping", suggests that the cricket was possibly meant and might be substituted for "blast." In Psalm 78:46, blast stands for חָסִיל hãsîl, "the destroyer", perhaps the locust in its caterpillar state, in which it is most destructive.
- Boar, wild — The only allusion to this animal is found Psalm 80:13 (חֲזִיר מִיָּ֑עַר ḥăzîr mîyā‘ar, "forest pig").
- Bruchus — Though it occurs once (Leviticus 11:22) as an equivalent for Hebrew, 'ârbéh (probably Locusta migratoria), the word bruchus is the regular interpretation for יֶלֶק yéléq, "licker". The biblical bruchus may be fairly identified with the beetle, or some insect akin to it. Anyway, the yéléq of Jer., 51:14,27, should have been rendered in the same manner as everywhere else.
- European bison (Bison bonasus) — So does the D.V. translate the Hebrew, yáhmûr, III K., iv, 23 (Hebrews 1 Samuel 5:3). Being a denizen of marshy and swampy lands, the buffalo must have been scarcely known by the Hebrews. Moreover, its coarse, unpleasant-smelling flesh seems to exclude the identification with the animal referred to in the above-mentioned passage, where we should probably read roebuck.
- Buffle — Another word for buffalo, D.V., Deut., xiv, 5. According to good authorities, the oryx, or white antelope, might be here intended, the Hebrew word יַחְמוּר yáhmûr possibly meaning, as its Arabic equivalent does, both the roebuck and the oryx.
- Bull (פַר par)— A symbol of fierce and relentless adversaries, Psalm 22:12.
- Bullock — The bullock (עֵגֶל ‘êḡel), as yet unaccustomed to the yoke, is an image of Israel's insubordinate mind before he was subdued by the captivity (Jeremiah 31:18).
- Buzzard (Hebr., רָאָה rã'ah) — Probably the ringtail of D.V. and the glede of A.V. (Deuteronomy 14:13); possibly, through a scribe's error, might be identified with the kite, דָּאָה dã'ah, of Leviticus 11:14. Buzzards, three species of which exist in Israel, have always been common there.

=== C ===
- Calf (עֵגֶל ‘êḡel; feminine עֶגְלָה ‘eḡlāh) One of the most popular representations of the deity among the Canaanites. The calf is, in biblical poetry, a figure for vexing and pitiless foes (Psalm 111:13). The fatted calf was a necessary feature, so to say, of a feast dinner.
- Camel (גָּמָל gāmāl; juvenile or Dromedary בִּכְרָה bik̲rāh) — a prominent domestic animal of the East without the existence of which life in the Arabian deserts would be impossible. Camels are mentioned in the biblical records as early as the time of Abraham.
- Camelopardalis — the translation of זֶמֶר (zemer) in Deuteronomy 14:5 of the D.V. The KJV translates this word to "camelopard", an archaic word for giraffe. זֶמֶר is translated as "mountain sheep" or "chamois" in most newer translations of the Bible. The mouflon is a likely candidate.
- Cankerworm — refers to a locust in its larval state; the translation of the Hebrew גָּזָם (gāzām) in the A.V.. The D.V. translates this word as "palmerworm" (Dichomeris ligulella).
- Cat — domestic cats are not mentioned in the Protestant Bible, but they are mentioned in Letter of Jeremiah verse 21. Cats were very familiar to the Ancient Egyptians, Assyrians, Babylonians, and Ancient Greeks and Romans even before their conquest of Egypt, so it is likely they would have been familiar to the Ancient Hebrews, making their omission from the Bible unusual. Other members of the cat family are mentioned in the Bible, namely lions, leopards, and (questionably) tigers. צִיִּים֙ (ṣiyyîm), mentioned in Isaiah 34:14, is translated as "wildcats" in some newer translations of the Bible such as the CEV and NRSV, making this potentially the only mention of small cats in the Protestant Bible.
- Cattle — Very early in the history of mankind, animals were tamed and domesticated, to be used in agriculture, for milk, for their flesh, and especially for sacrifices. Many words in Hebrew expressed the different ages and sexes of cattle, West of the Jordan River the cattle were generally stall-fed; in the plains and hills south and east they roamed in a half-wild state; such were the most famous "bulls of Bashan".
- Cerastes (שְׁפִיפֹן šəp̲îp̲ōn) — the horned cerastes (Cerastes hasselquistii) is a likely candidate for the "serpent" (D.V.) mentioned in Genesis 49:17. This identification is based on the Arabic name for this snake (shúffon) and its venomousness as mentioned in the Bible. שְׁפִיפֹן is translated as "adder", "viper" or "horned viper" in many translations of the Bible.
- Chameleon — Mentioned Lev. 11:30, with the mole (Hebr., תַּנְשֶׁמֶת tínshéméth). In spite of the authority of the ancient translations, it is now generally admitted that the tínshéméth is the chameleon, very common in Israel; whereas the כֹּחַ kôâh is a kind of large lizard, perhaps the land monitor (Psammosaurus scincus).
- Chamois (Rupicapra rupicapra) — the translation of זֶמֶר (zemer) in Deuteronomy 14:5 in some translations of the Bible (see § Camelopardalis). Chamois are not native to western Asia.
- Charadrion — the D.V.'s translation of אֲנָפָה (ʾănāp̲āh), one of the unclean species of bird, in Leviticus 11:19 and Deuteronomy 14:18). This word is translated as "heron" in other English translations of the Bible, and refers to herons in the genus Ardea in Modern Hebrew.
- Cherogrillus (Leviticus 11:5; Deuteronomy 14:7), a mere transliteration of the Greek name of the porcupine, corresponds to the Hebrew שָׁפָן shãphãn, translated in Psalm 104:18, as irchin, and in Proverbs 30:26, as rabbit. As St. Jerome noticed it, the shãphãn is not the porcupine, but a very peculiar animal of about the same size, dwelling among the rocks, and in holes, and called in Israel "bear-rat", on account of some resemblance with these two quadrupeds. We call it coney, or daman (Hyrax syriacus). Its habit of lingering among the rocks is alluded to, Psalm 104:18; its wisdom and defencelessness, Proverbs 30:24–26. "It cannot burrow, for it has no claws, only nails half developed; but it lies in holes in the rocks, and feeds only at dawn and dusk, always having sentries posted, at the slightest squeak from which the whole party instantly disappears. The coney is not a ruminant (cf. Leviticus 11:5), but it sits working its jaws as if re-chewing. It is found sparingly in most of the rocky districts, and is common about Sinai" (Tristram).
- Cobra (Naja haje), most likely the deadly snake called פֶתֶן péthén by the Hebrews, found in Israel and Egypt and used by serpent-charmers.
- Cochineal (שָׁנִי šənî; Coccus ilicis) — A hemiptera homoptera insect very common on the Syrian holm-oak, from the female of which the crimson dye kermes is prepared. The complete name in Hebrew is equivalent to "scarlet insect", the "insect" being not infrequently omitted in the translations.
- Cock, Hen — Domestic poultry are not mentioned till after the Babylonian captivity is what some believe but others understand the "seal of Jaazaniah" from the ruins of the biblical Judean kingdom at Mizpah, with the inscription of "belonging to Jaazaniah, servant to the king" to carry the insignia of a rooster "in fighting stance" for spiritual purposes based on Proverbs 30, with similar illustrations of "cocks in fighting stance" found within the Vivian Bible. In Jesus' time, domestic poultry, introduced from India through Persia, had become common, and their well-known habits gave rise to familiar expressions, and afforded good and easy illustrations (Mark 13:35; 14:30, etc.). Jesus compared his care for Jerusalem to that of a hen for her brood, or more accurately an ornis, a bird, specifically a rooster or hen. The three times the word 'cock' appears in the D.V. it is owing to a misinterpretation of the primitive text, according to some, but to others in the context of a religious instilling vessel of "a girt one of the loins" (Young's Literal Translation) that which is "stately in his stride" and "move with stately bearing" within the Book of Proverbs 30:29–31, Saʻadiah ben Yosef Gaon (Saadia Gaon) identifies the definitive trait of "a cock girded about the loins" within Proverbs 30:31(DV) as "the honesty of their behavior and their success", identifying a spiritual purpose of a religious vessel within that religious and spiritual instilling schema.
  1. Job 38:36, the word sékhwi (שֶׂכְוִי) means soul, heart: "Who hath put wisdom in the heart of man? and who gave his soul understanding?", but also "Sekvi means 'rooster' according to the Sages" and hence "Who hath put wisdom in the heart of man? or who gave the cock understanding?"(DV).
  2. Proverbs 30:31, zãrzîr (זַרְזִיר) should be translated as "hero" according to some, but to others as "a cock girded about the loins" or "a girt one of the loins"(Young's Literal Translation), "which most of the old translations and Rabbis understood to be a fighting cock".
  3. Isaiah 22;17, where the word gébhér (גֶּבֶר), great, strong man, has been rendered according to some rabbinical conceptions, but also the Hebrew word gever was used to mean a "rooster" in addition to the meaning of "man, strong man".
- Cockatrice — A fabulous serpent supposed to be produced from a cock's egg brooded by a serpent; it was alleged that its hissing would drive away all other serpents, and that its breath, even its look, was fatal. The word is used in A.V. as the regular equivalent for Hebrew צֶפַע tsif‘ōnî.
- Colt — See § Ass, colt.
- Rock hyrax — See § Cherogrillus.
- Coral, Hebrew רָאמָה rãmôth, should probably be substituted, Job, 28:18, for "eminent things", and Ezekiel 27:16, for "silk" in the D.V. The coral dealt with at Tyre was that of the Red Sea or even of the Indian Ocean; coral seems to have been scarcely known among the Jews.
- Cormorant — one of the unclean species of bird (Leviticus 11:17; Deuteronomy 14:17), commonly given as the translation of the Hebrew שָׁלָךְ (šālāk̲), although this name, which means "one who plunges", may have applied to a different species of plunging bird. שָׁלָךְ means "osprey" in Modern Hebrew.
- Cow — See § Cattle.
- Crane (Grus grus) — עָגוּר (ʿāg̲ûr) in Biblical and Modern Hebrew. Mentioned in Isaiah 38:14 and Jeremiah 8:7, alluding to its cry and its migration respectively. Translated as "swallow" in some translations of the Bible such as the D.V., and as "thrush" in the NIV.
- Cricket, a good translation for Hebrew צְלָצַל ṣəlāṣal, "chirping", which besides the feature suggested by the etymology, is described Deut. 28:42, as a voracious insect. See § Blast.
- Crocodile — We do not read this word in any other place than Lev. 11:29 (D.V.), where it corresponds to the Hebrew, צָב tsāḇ; the animal is, nevertheless, oftener spoken of in the Holy Books under cover of several metaphors: רַהַב ráhâb, "the proud" (Isaiah 51:9); תנין tánnîn, "the stretcher" (Ezekiel 29:3); לִוְיָתָן líweyãthãn (leviathan) [Ps. lxxiii (Hebr., lxxiv), 14; Job, xl, 20, xli, 25]. See § Dragon. The Nile crocodile (Crocodylus niloticus) is still found in great numbers in the upper Nile, and its range extended into present-day Israel until the early 20th century. A remarkable description of the crocodile has been drawn by the author of the Book of Job. He depicts the difficulty of capturing, snaring, or taming him, his vast size, his impenetrable scales, his flashing eyes, his snorting, and his immense strength. Dreadful as he is, the crocodile was very early regarded and worshipped as a deity by the Egyptians. He is, in the Bible, the emblem of the people of Egypt and their Pharaoh, sometimes even of all Israel's foes.
- Cuckoo — the original referrent of the Hebrew שַׁחַף (šaḥap̲) according to some, listed as one of the unclean birds in (Leviticus 11:16 and Deuteronomy 14:15). Common cuckoos (Cuculus canorus) and great spotted cuckoos (Clamator glandarius) are found in the Holy Land; however there is little probability that the cuckoo is intended, with shearwaters or seagulls being more likely. שַׁחַף refers to seagulls in Modern Hebrew.

=== D ===
- Deer — (אַיָּל ʾayyāl, female אַיָּלָה ʾayyālāh). Deer's graceful appearance, swiftness, shyness, and love for their fawns are alluded to. Proverbs 5:19 and other mentions indicate that אַיָּל and אַיָּלָה were well-known terms of endearment between lovers.
- Demons — The translation of צִיִּים֙ (ṣiyyîm) in Isaiah 34:14 in the D.V.. The word is translated to "wild beasts of the desert", "wild beasts", "desert creatures", "hyenas" or "wildcats" in other translations of the Bible.
- Dispas — The D.V., following the Vulgate (Deuteronomy 8:15) thereby means a serpent whose bite causes a mortal thirst; but this interpretation seems to come from a misunderstanding suggested by the Septuagint; the original writer most likely intended there to mean "drought" (צִמָּאוֹן tsimmā’ōn, "thirsty ground"), as the A.V. rightly puts it, and not any kind of serpent.
- Dog (כֶּלֶב keleḇ) — References to dogs in the Bible are overwhelmingly negative, reflective of the prevalence of domestic dogs as feral scavengers, and thus being regarded as overwhelmingly unclean. However, there are also references to dogs as livestock guardians (Job 30:1) and guards (Isaiah 56:10). In Proverbs 30:31, זַרְזִיר מָתְנַיִם (zarzîr mot̲nayim, literally "girt in the loins") is translated as "greyhound" in some translations such as the KJV, but as "(strutting) rooster" or "war horse" in other translations. Jesus refers to dogs in positive light in the New Testament and a symbol of great faith and humbleness in Matthew 15:21-28 and Mark 7:24-30. "But He answered and said, 'It is not good to take the children’s bread and throw it to the little dogs.' And she said, 'Yes, Lord, yet even the little dogs eat the crumbs which fall from their masters’ table.' Then Jesus answered and said to her, 'O woman, great is your faith! Let it be to you as you desire.' And her daughter was healed from that very hour."
- Dove (Hebr., יוֹנָה yônah) — Though distinguishing it from tôr, the turtle-dove, the Jews were perfectly aware of their natural affinity and speak of them together. The dove is mentioned in the Bible more often than any other bird (over 50 times); this comes both from the great number of doves flocking in Israel, and of the favour they enjoy among the people. The dove is first spoken of in the record of the flood (Genesis 8:8–12); later on we see that Abraham offered up some in sacrifice, which would indicate that the dove was very early domesticated. In fact several allusions are made to dove-cotes, with their "windows" or latticed openings. But in olden times as well as now, besides the legions of pigeons that swarm around the villages, there were many more rock-doves, "doves of the valleys", as they are occasionally termed (Ezekiel 7:16; Song of Songs 2:14; Jeremiah 48:28), that filled the echoes of the mountain gorges with the rustling of their wings. The metallic lustre of their plumage, the swiftness of their flight, their habit of sweeping around in flocks, their plaintive coo, are often alluded to by the different sacred writers. The dark eye of the dove, encircled by a line of bright red skin, is also mentioned; its gentleness and innocence made it the type of trust and love, and, most naturally, its name was one of the most familiar terms of endearment. Jesus spoke of the dove as a symbol of simplicity; the sum of its perfections made it a fitting emblem for the Holy Spirit.
- Dragon, a word frequently found in the translations of the Bible as substitute, so it seems, for other names of animals that the translators were unable to identify. It stands indeed for several Hebrew names:
  1. תַנִּ֑ thán (Job 30:29; Isaiah 34:13; 35:7; 43:20; Jeremiah 9:11; 10:22; 14:6; 49:33; 51:37; Micah 1:8; Malachi 1:3), unquestionably meaning a denizen of desolate places, and generally identified with the jackal;
  2. תנין tánnîn, in a few passages with the sense of serpent [Deuteronomy 32:33; Psalm xc (Hebr., xci), 13; Dan., xiv, 22-27], in others most likely signifying the crocodile [Ps., lxxiii (Hebr., lxxiv), 13; Isaiah 51:9; Ezekiel 29:3], or even a sea-monster (Ezekiel 32:2), such as a whale, porpoise, or dugong, as rightly translated in Lam., iv, 3, and as probably intended in Ps., cxlviii, 7;
  3. לִוְיָתָן líweyãthãn (leviathan), meaning both the crocodile [Ps., lxxiii (Hebr., lxxiv), 14] and sea-monster [Ps. ciii (Hebr., civ), 26];
  4. צִיִּים֙ tsîyîm (Psalm 73:14; Jeremiah 1:39), which possibly means the hyena.

Other places, such as Esther 10:7; 11:6; Ecclus., xxv, 23, can be neither traced back to a Hebrew original, nor identified with sufficient probability. The author of the Apocalypse repeatedly makes mention of the dragon, by which he means "the old serpent, who is called the Devil and Satan, who seduceth the whole world" (Revelation 12:9, etc.). Of the fabulous dragon fancied by the ancients, represented as a monstrous winged serpent with a crested head and enormous claws, and regarded as very powerful and ferocious, no mention is found in the Bible. The word dragon, consequently, should really be removed from Bibles, except perhaps from Isaiah 14:29 and 30:6, where the draco fimbriatus is possibly spoken of. See § Basilisk, 4.

- Dromedary — Hebrew: בִּכְרָה, biḵrāh, in Isaiah 60:6, signifies "a swift and finely bred camel".
- Dugong — See § Badger.

=== E ===
- Eagle — So is generally rendered the Hebrew, נֶשֶׁר néshér, but there is a doubt as to whether the eagle or some kind of vulture is intended. It seems even probable that the Hebrews did not distinguish very carefully these different large birds of prey, and that all are spoken of as though they were of one kind. Nine species of eagle are known to occur in Israel: golden eagles (Aquila chrysaetos), eastern imperial eagles (Aquila heliaca), steppe eagles (Aquila nipalensis), Bonelli's eagles (Aquila fasciata), greater spotted eagles (Clanga clanga), lesser spotted eagles (Clanga pomarina), booted eagles (Hieraaetus pennatus), short-toed snake eagles (Circaetus gallicus), and, rarely, Verreaux's eagles (Aquila verreauxii). Many allusions are made to the eagle in the Bible: its inhabiting the dizziest cliffs for nesting, its keen sight, its habit of congregating to feed on the slain, its swiftness, its longevity, its remarkable care in training its young, are often referred to (see in particular Job 39:27-30). When the relations of Israel with their neighbours became more frequent, the eagle became, under the pen of the Jewish prophets and poets, an emblem first of the Assyrian, then of the Babylonian, and finally of the Persian kings.
- Elephant — We learn from Assyrian inscriptions that before the Hebrews settled in Syria, there existed elephants in that country, and Tiglath-Pileser I tells us about his exploits in elephant hunting. We do not read, however, of elephants in the Bible until the Maccabean times. Although I Kings speaks of ivory, or "[elephants'] teeth", as the Hebrew text puts it, yet not as indigenous, but as imported from Ophir. In the post-exilian times, especially in the books of the Maccabees, elephants are frequently mentioned; they were an important element in the armies of the Seleucids. These animals were imported either from India or from Africa.
- Ericus, a Latin name of the hedgehog, preserved in the D.V. as a translation of the Hebrew word קִפוֹד qíppôdh (Isaiah 14:23; 34:11; Zephaniah 2:14, the word urchin has been used) and קִפוֹז qîppôz (Isaiah 34:15). The above identification of the qíppôdh is based both on the Greek rendering and the analogy between this Hebrew word and the Talmudic (qúppádh), Syriac (qufdô'), Arabic (qúnfúd) and Ethiopian (qinfz) names of the hedgehog. Several scholars, however, discard this identification, because the hedgehog, contrary to the qíppôdh, lives neither in marshes nor ruins, and has no voice. The bittern meets all the requirements of the texts where the qíppôdh is mentioned. It should be noticed nevertheless that hedgehogs are far from rare in Israel. As to the qîppôz of Is. 34:15, read qíppôdh by some Hebrew Manuscripts, and interpreted accordingly by the Septuagint, Vulgate and the versions derived therefrom, its identity is a much discussed question. Some, arguing from the authorities just referred to, confound it with the qíppôdh, whereas others deem it to be the arrow-snake; but besides that no such animal as arrow-snake is known to naturalists, the context seems to call for a bird.
- Ewe (רָחֵל rəḥêl) — In Hebrew, six names at least, with their feminines, express the different stages of development of the sheep. Its domestication goes back to the night of time, so that the early traditions enshrined in the Bible speak of the first men as shepherds. Whatever may be thought of this point, it is out of question that from the dawn of historical times down to our own, flocks have constituted the staple of the riches of the land. The ewe of Israel is generally the ovis laticaudata, the habits of which, resembling those of all other species of sheep, are too well known to be here dwelt upon. Let it suffice to notice that scores of allusions are made in the Holy Books to these habits as well as to the different details of the pastoral life.

=== F ===
- Falcon — See § Hawk.
- Fallow-deer (Cervus dama or Dama vulgaris). The fallow-deer is scarce in the Holy Land and found only north of Mount Thabor. If it is mentioned at all in the Bible, it is probably ranked among the deer.
- Faun — An equivalent in D.V. (Jeremiah 1:39), after St. Jerome, for Hebrew, 'íyyîm. St. Jerome explains that they were wild beings, denizens of deserts and woods, with a hooked nose, a horned forehead, and goat feet. He translated the Hebrew as fig-faun, adding to the original the adjective ficarii, possibly following in this the pagan idea which, supposing that figs incline to lust, regarded fig-groves a well fitted abode for fauns. The same Hebrew word is rendered in Is., xiii, 22 as owls, and in Is., xxxiv, 14, as monsters, which shows a great perplexity on the part of the translators. The true meaning, being "howlers", seems to point out the jackal, called the "howler" by the Arabs.
- Fawn (Proverbs 5:19), for Hebrew, yá'alah, feminine of yã'el which should be regularly, as it is in several passages, rendered by wild goat (Nubian ibex). See § Goat, wild.
- Fish — Fish are mentioned extensively in the Bible, although no particular species is named. Fishermen are mentioned in both Old and New Testaments, including several of Jesus' followers. The biblical fish category includes marine mammals. ("Even the sea monsters draw out the breast, they give suck to their young ones..." Lamentations 4:3 A.V. & D.V.) Jonah's fish: According to the Book of Jonah, a "great fish" swallowed the prophet Jonah (Jonah 1:17 A.V.), and he was in its belly for three days, before being vomited up. Matthew 12:40 refers to it as a whale.
- Flea, spoken of I K., xxiv, 15; xxvi, 20, as the most insignificant cause of trouble that may befall a man.
- Flock — The flocks of Israel include generally both sheep and goats: "The sheep eat only the fine herbage, whereas the goats browse on what the sheep refuse. They pasture and travel together in parallel columns, but seldom intermingle more closely, and at night they always classify themselves. The goats are for the most part black, the sheep white, dappled or piebald, forming a very marked contrast..." (Tristram). The shepherd usually leads the flock, calling the sheep by their names from time to time; in his footsteps follows an old he-goat, whose stately bearing affords to the natives matter for several comparisons; the Arabs, indeed to this day, call a man of stately mien a "he-goat". The shepherd at sunset waters his flock, folds them ordinarily in some of the many caves found on every hillside, and with trained dogs guards them at night.
- Fly — Two Hebrew words are thus translated:
  1. 'ãrõbh is the name of the Egyptian fly of the fourth plague; this name, a collective one, though translated as dog-fly in the Septuagint, seems to signify all kinds of flies. Flies are at all times an almost insufferable nuisance; the common house-fly, with the gnat, vexes men, while gad-flies of every description tsetse, œstru, hippoboscida, tabanus marocanus, etc., infest animals.
  2. Zebhûbh is likewise the collective name of the Israeli fly, but more specifically of the gad-fly.

Though a trifle less annoying than in Egypt, flies were, however, deemed a plague severe enough in Israel to induce the natives to have recourse to the power of a special god, Bá'ál-zebhûbh, the master of the flies, that they and their cattle be protected against that scourge.

- Fowl — This word which, in its most general sense, applies to anything that flies in the air (Genesis 1:20, 21), including the "bat" and "flying creeping things" (Leviticus 11:19-23 A.V.), and which frequently occurs in the Bible with this meaning, is also sometimes used in a narrower sense, as, for instance, III K., iv, 23, where it stands for all fatted birds that may be reckoned among the delicacies of a king's table; so likewise Gen., xv, 11 and Is., xviii, 6, where it means birds of prey in general. In this latter signification allusions are made to their habit of perching on bare or dead trees, or of flocking together in great numbers.
- Fox — Thus is usually rendered the Hebrew, shû'ãl, which signifies both fox and jackal, even the latter more often than the former. The fox, however, was well known by the ancient Hebrews, and its cunning was as proverbial among them as among us (Ezekiel 13:4; Luke 13:32).
- Frog — Though not rare in Israel, this word is only mentioned in the Old Testament in connection with the second plague of Egypt. Five species of frogs and toads are known to live in the Holy Land: Hula painted frogs (Latonia nigriventer), marsh frogs (Pelophylax ridibundus), Savigny's treefrogs (Hyla savignyi), Syrian spadefoots (Pelobates syriacus), and variable green toads (Bufotes sitibundus). In Apoc., xvi, 13, the frog is the emblem of unclean spirits.

=== G ===
- Gazelle (Hebr., çebî, i. e. beauty) has been known at all times as one of the most graceful of all animals. Several species still exist in Israel. Its different characteristics, its beauty of form, its swiftness, its timidity, the splendour and meekness of its eye, are in the present time, as well as during the age of the Old Testament writers, the subjects of many comparisons. However, the name of the gazelle is scarcely, if at all, to be found in the Bible; in its stead we read roe, hart, or deer. Like a few other names of graceful and timid animals, the word gazelle has always been in the East a term of endearment in love. It was also a woman's favourite name (1 Chronicles 8:9; 2 Kings 12:1; 2 Chronicles 24:1; Acts 9:36).
- Gecko — Probable translation of the 'anãqah of the Hebrews, generally rendered in our versions by shrew-mouse, for which it seems it should be substituted. The gecko, ptyodactylus gecko of the naturalists, is common in Israel.
- Gier-eagle — So does A.V. render the Hebrew, rãhãm (Leviticus 11:18) or rãhãmah (Deuteronomy 14:17). By the gier-eagle, the Egyptian vulture (neophron percnopterus), or Pharao's hen, is generally believed to be signified. However, whether this bird should be really recognized in the Hebrew, rãhãm, is not easy to decide; for while, on the one hand, the resemblance of the Arabic name for the Egyptian vulture with the Hebrew word rãhãm seems fairly to support the identification, the mention of the rãhãm in a list of wading birds, on the other hand, casts a serious doubt on its correctness.
- Giraffe — See § Camelopardalus. Probably the תחשׁ (taḥash). (Numbers 4:5-15). Mistranslated as badger or dolphin.
- Gnat — The same insect called sciniph in Ex., viii, 16, 17 and Ps. civ (Hebr., cv), 31, and known under the familiar name of mosquito, Culex pipiens, is taken in the New Testament as an example of a trifle.
- Goat — Though the sacred writers spoke of the ewe more frequently than of the goat, yet with the latter they were very well acquainted. It was indeed, especially in the hilly regions east of the Jordan, an important item in the wealth of the Israelites. The goat of Israel, particularly the capra membrica, affords numerous illustrations and allusions, Its remarkably long ears are referred to by Amos, iii, 12; its glossy dark hair furnishes a graphic comparison to the author of Cant., iv, 1; vi, 4; this hair was woven into a strong cloth; the skin tanned with the hair on served to make bottles for milk, wine, oil, water, etc. The kid was an almost essential part of a feast. The goat is mentioned in Dan., viii, 5, as the symbol of the Macedonian empire. The grand Gospel scene of the separation of the just and the wicked on the last day is borrowed from the customs of the shepherds in the East.
- Goat, wild, Job, xxxix, 1; I K., xxiv, 3, where it is an equivalent for yã' él, translated in Ps., ciii (Hebr., Civ), 18, as hart and in Prov., v, 19, as fawn, is most probably the Nubian ibex, a denizen of the rocky summits [Ps. ciii (Hebr., civ), 18]. It was regarded as a model of grace (Proverbs 5:19), and its name, Jael/Yael (יָעֵל), Jahala, was frequently given to persons (Judges 5:6; Ezra 2:56, etc.). See also: Nubian ibex § Cultural Significance and Human Exploitation
- Grasshopper, is probably the best rendering for the Hebrew, hãgãb [Lev.11:22; Num. 13:34 (Hebrews 13:33); Isaiah 40:22; Eccles. 12:5, etc.], as in the A.V., if the Hebrew word be interpreted "hopper" as Karl August Credner suggests; the D.V. uses the word locust. The grasshopper is one of the smaller species of the locust tribe.
- Griffon — So D.V., Lev. 11:13 (whereas Deuteronomy 14:12, we read "grype") translates the Hebrew, pérés, the "breaker" whereby the lammergeyer or bearded vulture, gypœtus barbatus, the largest and most magnificent of the birds of prey is probably intended. The opinion that the Bible here speaks of the fabulous griffon, i.e. a monster begotten from a lion and an eagle, and characterized by the beak, neck, and wings of an eagle and the legs and rump of a lion, is based only on a misinterpretation of the word.
- Griffon vulture, a probable translation in several cases of the Hebrew, néshér, regularly rendered by eagle. This most majestic bird (Gyps fulvus), the type, as it seems, of the eagle-headed figures of Assyrian sculpture, is most likely referred to in Mich., i, 16, on account of its bare neck and head.
- Grype, Deuteronomy 14:12. See § Griffon.

=== H ===
- Haje — See § Asp.
- Hare — Mentioned Lev., xi, 6; Deut., xiv, 7, in the list of the unclean quadrupeds. Several subspecies of the European hare and the Cape hare live in Israel: Lepus europaeus syriacus in the north; Lepus europaeus judeae in the south and the Jordan valley, together with Lepus capensis sinaiticus, Lepus capensis aegyptius and Lepus capensis isabellinus, The statement of the Bible that the hare "cheweth the cud" is a classical difficulty. It should be noticed that this is not the reason why the hare is reckoned among the unclean animals; but the cause thereof should be sought for in the fact that though it chews the cud, which certainly it appears to do, it does not divide the hoof.
- Harrier — So D.V., Deuteronomy 14:13, translates rã'ah, possibly substituted by a scribe's error for dã'ah, and very likely meaning the black kite (Milvus migrans).
- Hart and hind — Either the Persian fallow deer, which has been successfully reintroduced to the Holy Land, or the red deer, now locally extinct, or the deer generally. The hind is associated with the Tribe and figure of Naphtali, following the Blessing of Jacob in Genesis (49:21): "Naphtali is a hind let loose, Which yields lovely fawns." It has afforded many illustrations to time biblical writers and poets, especially by its fleetness (Song of Songs 2:9; Isaiah 35:6), its sure-footedness [Ps. xvii (Hebr., xviii), 34; Hab., iii, 19], its affection (Proverbs 5:19), and its habit of hiding its young (Job 39:1).
- Hawk (Hebr., neç) is, in the Scriptures, a general denomination including, with the falcon, all the smaller birds of prey, the kestrel, merlin, sparrowhawk, hobby, and others, most common in Israel.
- Nighthawk, A.V. for Hebrew, táhmãs, more exactly translated in D.V. as owl; some bird of the latter kind is indeed undoubtedly intended, probably the barn owl (Tyto alba).
- Sparrowhawk (Accipiter nisus), one of the hawks of Israel, so common that it might be regarded, in reference to the Bible, as the hawk par excellence.
- Hedgehog — See § Ericus.
- Hen, See § Cock, Hen.
- Heron — Mentioned Lev., xi, 19, in the list of unclean birds, but probably in the wrong place in the D.V.; heron, indeed, should be substituted for charadrion, whereas in the same verse it stands for stork, as the A.V. correctly states it.
- Hind — See § Hart.
- Hippopotamus — See § Behemoth.
- Hobby (Falco subbuteo). See § Hawk.
- Hoopoe — See § Houp.
- Hornet (Hebr., çíre'ah; vespa crabro) — One of the largest and most pugnacious wasps; when disturbed they attack cattle and horses; their sting is very severe, capable not only of driving men and cattle to madness, but even of killing them (Exodus 23:28; Deuteronomy 7:20; Joshua 24:12).
- Horse — The horse is never mentioned in Scripture in connection with the patriarchs; the first time the Bible speaks of it, it is in reference to the Egyptian army pursuing the Hebrews, During the epoch of the conquest and of Judges, we hear of horses only with the Chanaanean troops, and later on with the Philistines, The hilly country inhabited by the Israelites was not favourable to the use of the horse; this is the reason why the Bible speaks of horses only in connection with war. David and Solomon established a cavalry and chariot force; but even this, used exclusively for wars of conquest, seems to have been looked upon as a dangerous temptation to kings, for the Deuteronomy legislation forbids them to multiply horses for themselves. The grand description of the war horse in Job is classical; it will be noticed, however, that its praises are more for the strength than for the swiftness of the horse. The prophet Zacharias depicts (ix, 10) the Messianic age as one in which no hostilities will be heard of; then all warlike apparel being done away with, the horse will serve only for peaceful use.
- Houp (Leviticus 11:19; Deuteronomy 14:18) — The analogy of the Hebrew with Syriac and Coptic for the name of this bird makes the identification doubtless, although some, after the example of the A.V., see in the Hebrew dûkhîpháth, the lapwing. The Egyptians worshipped the houp and made it the emblem of Horus.
- Striped hyena — This word is not to be found in any of the English translations of the Bible; it occurs twice in the Septuagint, Jer., xii, 9, and Ecclus., xiii, 22, being in both places the rendering for the Hebrew name çãbhûá. The hyenas are very numerous in the Holy Land, where they are most active scavengers; they feed upon dead bodies, and sometimes dig the tombs open to get at the corpses therein buried. Two Hebrew names are supposed to designate the hyena:
  1. çãbhûá'. This word, which has been interpreted "speckled bird", Jer., xii, 9, by modern translators following the Vulgate, has been rendered by "holy man", Ecclus., xiii, 22. Despite the authorities that favour the above-mentioned translation of Jer., xii, 9, the consistency of the Septuagint on the one hand, and on the other the parallelism in the latter passage, in addition to the analogy with the Arabic and rabbinical Hebrew names for the hyena, fairly support the identification of the çãbhûá' with this animal.
  2. çíyyím, rendered in divers manners in different places: wild beasts, Is., xiii, 21; demons, Is., xxxiv, 14; dragons, Ps. lxxiii (hebr., lxxiv), 14; Jer., 1, 39.

=== I ===
- Ibex — See § Goat, wild and Nubian ibex § Cultural Significance and Human Exploitation
- Ibis — The word occurs twice in the D.V. (Leviticus 11:17; Isaiah 34:11) as an equivalent for yánshûph; some good authorities, however, though the yánshûph is mentioned among wading birds, do not admit the above identification and think that the Pharaoh eagle-owl (Bubo ascalaphus), which they term great owl, is spoken of. The ibis was worshipped by the Egyptians as the emblem of Thoth.
- Ichneumon — See § Weasel.
- Irchin — D.V. Psalm 103:18. See § Cherogrillus.

=== J ===
- Jackal — Frequently alluded to in Bible, though the name is read neither in the D.V. nor in any of the western translations, probably because the animal, however common in Africa and south-western Asia is unknown in European countries. The name regularly substituted for jackal is fox. The jackal seems to be designated in Hebrew by three different names: shû'ãl, "the digger"; 'íyyîm, "the howlers"; and tãn, "the stretcher", although we are unable to state the differences marked by these three names, numerous references may be found throughout the Bible to the jackal's howlings and gregarious habits. The most likely species mentioned is the golden jackal, which is the only jackal to live in the Middle East.
- Jerboa — This little animal, at least four species of which abide in Syria, is nowhere nominally mentioned in the Bible; it must, nevertheless, very probably be reckoned among the unclean animals indicated under the general name of mouse.

=== K ===
- Kestrel — A slender falcon, most likely one of the species intended by Leviticus 11:16, for it is very common in Israel. The remark of Job 39:26, strikingly points out the Tinnulus cenchris, one of the Israeli kestrels.
- Kid — See § Goat.
- Kind — See § Species.
- Kine — See § Cattle.
- Kite — As suggested by the analogy with the Arabic, the black kite (Milvus migrans) is probably meant by Hebr. dã'ah or dáyyah (Leviticus 11:14; Deuteronomy 14:13; Isaiah 34:15), interpreted kite in the D.V.; it is one of the most common of the scavenger birds of prey of the country, and for this reason, is carefully protected by the villagers.

=== L ===
- Lamb — The Paschal Lamb was both a commemoration of the deliverance from the bondage in Egypt, and a prophetic figure of the Son of God sacrificed to free His people from their slavery to sin and death. See § Ewe.
- Lamia (Isaiah 34:14) — Is a translation of Hebrew, lîlîth; according to the old popular legends, the lamia was a feminine bloodthirsty monster, devouring men and children. In the above cited place, some kind of owl is probably meant.
- Lammergeyer (Gypaetus barbatus) very likely signified by the Hebrew, pérés, translated as griffon in D.V.
- Larus — Lev., xi; 16; Deut., xiv, 15. See § Cuckoo.
- Horse-leech (Proverbs 30:15) — Both the medicinal leech and the horse-leech are frequently found in the streams, pools, and wells; they often attach themselves to the inside of the lips and nostrils of drinking animals, thereby causing them much pain.
- Leopard — Under this name come a certain number of carnivorous animals more or less resembling the leopard (Panthera pardus), namely cheetahs (Acinonyx jubatus), Eurasian lynxes (Lynx lynx) etc., all formerly numerous throughout Israel, and even now occasionally found, especially in the woody districts. The leopard is taken by the biblical writers as a type of cunning (Jeremiah 5:6; Hosea 13:7), of fierceness, of a conqueror's sudden swoop (Dan., vii, 6; Hab., i, 8). Its habit of lying in wait by a well or a village is repeatedly alluded to.
- Leviathan — The word Leviathan (Hebrew, líweyãthãn), which occurs six times in the Hebrew Bible, seems to have puzzled ancient translators. The D.V. has kept this name, Job, iii, 8; xl, 20; Is., xxvii, 1; it is rendered by dragon Ps. lxxiii (Hebr., lxxiv), 14, and ciii (Hebr., civ), 26; The word leviathan means a sea-monster in Isaiah 27:1); Job 41
- Lion — Now extinct in Israel and in the surrounding countries, the lion was common there during the Old Testament times; hence the great number of words in the Hebrew language to signify it; under one or another of these names it is mentioned 130 times in the Scriptures, as the classical symbol of strength, power, courage, dignity, ferocity. Very likely as the type of power, it became the ensign of the tribe of Judah; so was it employed by Solomon in the decoration of the temple and of the king's house. For the same reason, Apoc., v, 5, represents Jesus Christ as the lion of the tribe of Juda. The craft and ferocity of the lion, on the other hand, caused it to be taken as an emblem of Satan (1 Peter 5:8) and of the enemies of the truth (2 Timothy 4:17).
- Lizard — Immense is the number of these reptiles in Israel; no less than 44 species are found there, Among those mentioned in the Bible we may cite:
  1. The Letã'ah, general name of the lizard, applied especially to the common lizard, the green lizard, the blindworm, etc.;
  2. the chõmét, or sand lizard;
  3. the çãb, or dább of the Arabs (Uromastyx aegyptia);
  4. the kõâh, the diverse kinds of monitor lizards, such as desert monitors.
  5. the 'anãqah or gecko;
  6. the semãmîth or stellio.
- Locust — One of the worst scourges of the East, very often referred to in Bible. As many as nine Hebrew words signify either the locust in general or some species:
  1. 'árbéh, probably the migratory locust (Locusta migratoria);
  2. gãzãm, possibly the locust in its larva state, the palmerworm;
  3. Gôbh, the locust in general;
  4. chagab, most likely the grasshopper;
  5. hãsîl, "the destroyer", perhaps the locust in its hopper state, in which it is most destructive;
  6. hárgõl, translated in the D.V. as ophiomachus;
  7. yéléq, the stinging locust;
  8. çelãçâl possibly the cricket; and
  9. sôl'ãm, rendered by attacus, or bald locust (probably the truxalis).

Unlike other insects, locusts are most voracious in every stage of their existence.

- Louse — According to some this species of vermin was one of the features of the third Egyptian plague. It is but too common through all eastern countries.

=== M ===
- Mildew — A word occurring a certain number of times in the D.V. as an equivalent for Hebrew, hãsîl, which probably means a kind of locust.
- Mole — Two Hebrew words are thus rendered, The first, tînshéméth (Leviticus 11:30), would, according to good authorities, rather signify the chameleon; with the second, haphárperôth (Isaiah 2:20), some burrowing animal is undoubtedly intended, The mole of Syria is not the common mole of Europe (Talpa europaea), but a blind mole rat, like the Middle East blind mole-rat (Nannospalax ehrenbergi), a blind burrowing rodent.
- Monkey — See § Ape. Occurs in 1 Kings 10:22 (NKJV).
- Mosquito — See § Gnat.
- Moth — Is in the D.V. besides Is., xiv, 11, where it stands for rímmah, "worms", the common rendering for two words: 'ãsh (Job 4:19), and sãs (Isaiah 51:8), the exact meaning of the former is uncertain, whereas by the latter the clothes moth is meant.
- Mouflon — See §§ Chamois and Camelopardalis.
- Mouse — This word seems to be a general one, including the various rats, dormice, jerboas, and hamsters, about twenty-five species of which exist in the country.
- Mule — In spite of the enactment of the Law (Leviticus 19:19), the Israelites early in the course of their history possessed mules; these animals, in a hilly region such as the Holy Land, were for many purposes preferable to horses and stronger than asses; they were employed both for domestic and warlike use.

=== N ===
- Night-hawk — See § Hawk.

=== O ===
- Oryx — See § Antelope.
- Osprey (Hebr. עָזְנִיָּה ‘āzənîyāh) — The fishing eagle, which name probably signifies all the smaller eagles.
- Ossifrage — See § Lammergeyer.
- Ostrich — Still occasionally found in the southeastern deserts of Israel, the ostrich, if we are to judge from the many mentions made of it, was well known among the Hebrews. The beauty of its plumage, its fleetness, its reputed stupidity, its leaving its eggs on the sand and hatching them by the sun's heat are repeatedly alluded to. Know in Hebrew as יָעֵן (ya‘ên) or as רֶנֶנִ֥ (rənān, "[bird of] piercing cries"). The word תַּחְמָס (taḥmās) may refer to a male ostrich, but is also conjectured as "owl" or "swallow."
- Owl — A generic name under which many species of nocturnal birds are designated, some having a proper name in the Hebrew (יַנְשׁוּף yanšōp̄, אֹחַ ’ōḥ, כּוֺס kōs), some others possessing none. Among the former we may mention the little owl (Athene noctua), the Pharaoh eagle-owl (Bubo ascalaphus), the great owl of some authors, called ibis in the D.V., the screech owl or hooting owl, probably the lîlîth (לִיִלית) of Isaiah 34, and the lamia of St. Jerome and the D.V.; the western barn owl (Tyto alba), possibly corresponding to the תַּחְמָס (taḥmās) of the Hebrew and rendered by night-hawk in the A.V.; and the qîppôz (קִפוֹז) of Isaiah 34:15, as yet unidentified and sometimes translated "arrow snake" or "tree snake."
- Ox — See § Cattle.
- Ox, wild, Is., hi, 20. See § Antelope.

=== P ===
- Palmerworm (Hebr., gãzãm) A general word for the locust, very likely in its larva state.
- Partridge — Partridges are mentioned three times in the Bible: 1 Kings 26:20, Jeremiah 17:11, and Sirach 11:30 (in the Apocrypha). Francolins and sand partridges are found in the Holy Land.
- Peacock — A common translation of תֻּכִּיִּים (tukkiyyîm), mentioned in 1 Kings 10:22 and 2 Chronicles 9:21 as an import from Tarshish alongside apes (monkeys). The word is a hapax legomenon. The interpretation as "peacock" is based on similarity to Dravidian words such as Tamil தோகை (tōkai, "peacock tail"). In Modern Hebrew, תֻּכִּי refers to parrots.
- Pelican, D.V., Psalm 102:7 (Vulgate: Psalm 101), for Hebr. qã'áth, in other places is rendered by bittern, for which it might be advantageously substituted. Pelicans are usually found about marshes (Isaiah 34:11), and are in the habit of sitting for hours in sandy desolate places Psalm 102:7 (Vulgate: Psalm 101); Soph., ii, 14] after they have gorged.
- Phoenix or chol might possibly be read instead of palmtree (Hebr. hôl) in Job 29:18, where the belief in its immortality seems referred to; however the sense adopted by D.V., after Vulgate and Septuagint, should not be slighted.
- Pigeon — See § Dove.
- Plunger — See § Cormorant.
- Porcupine — Believed by some, on account of a certain analogy of the Hebrew qîppõd with the Arabic name of this animal, to be spoken of in the Bible. See § Ericus.
- Porphyrion is in Vulgate and D.V. (Leviticus 11:18), the equivalent for the Hebrew, rãhãm, translated in the Septuagint as "swan"; in the Greek version, porphyrion stands for the Hebrew, tínshéméth, interpreted as "swan" in the Latin and English Bibles. The hypothesis that the Greek translators used a Hebrew text in which the two words rãhãm and tínshéméth stood contrariwise to their present order in the Massoretic text, might account for this difference. This hypothesis is all the more probable because in Deuteronomy 14:17, porphyrion seems to be the Greek translation for rãhãm. Whatever this may be, whether the porphyrion, or western swamphen (Porphyrio porphyrio), or the Egyptian vulture, should be identified with the rãhãm remains uncertain. See § Gier-eagle.
- Pygarg (Deuteronomy 14:5) — This word, a mere adaptation from the Greek, means "white-rumped", a character common to many species, though the addax (Addax nasomaculatus) is possibly signified by the Hebrew word dîshõn.

=== Q ===
- Quail (שְׂלָו śəlāw)— The description given Exodus 16:11–13; Numbers 11:31, 32; Psalm 78:27–35 (Vulgate: Psalm 77), and Psalm 105:40 (Vulgate: Psalm 104), the references to their countless flocks, their low flying, their habit of alighting on land in the morning, together with the analogy of the Hebrew and Arabic names, make it certain that the common quail (Coturnix coturnix) is intended.

=== R ===
- Rabbit (Proverbs 30:26) — A coney. See § Cherogrillus.
- Ram — See §§ Ewe and Flock.
- Raven — The Bible includes under this generic name a certain number of birds having more or less resemblance with ravens, such as magpies, jays, jackdaws, starlings, etc. Ravens, of which there are eight species found in Israel, are by far the most common of all the birds of that country, where they are active scavengers along with buzzards, vultures, dogs, jackals, and hyenas. Its plumage is glossy black, and its habits are frequently alluded to in Bible, for instance feeding on carcasses, wandering for its precarious meals, picking out the eyes of the newly dropped or weakly animals, resorting to desolate places, etc. The raven, when no other food is nigh, not infrequently picks out grains freshly sown; hence its surname of seed-picker, spermologos, which, later on became a synonym for ragamuffin. This name, applied to St. Paul by his sceptical listeners of Athens, has become, through a mistranslation, "word-sower" in our Bibles (Acts 17:18).
- Night raven, the equivalent in Psalm 102 (Vulgate: Psalm 101) verse 7, of the Hebrew word translated in Leviticus 11:17, as screech-owl, seems to mean the blue rock thrush (Monticola solitarius), a well-known solitary bird of the country, which is fond of sitting alone on a roof or a rock.
- Rhinoceros, Numbers 23:22, stands for Hebrew, re'em, and should consequently be rendered by aurochs.
- Rooster, See § Cock, Hen. – alektór

=== S ===
- Satyr — So is the Hebrew sã'îr rendered Isaiah 13:21, and 34:14, by R.V. (D.V.: "hairy one"). The same word in Leviticus 17:7, and 2 Chronicles 11:15, is translated "devils" in all English Bibles. Sã'îr usually signifies the he-goat. In the latter passages this sense is clearly inapplicable; it seems hardly applicable in the former. The writers of Leviticus, and 2 Paralipomenon possibly intended some representation of the same description as the goat-headed figures of the Egyptian Pantheon. Concerning the sã'îr mentioned in Isaias, no satisfactory explanation has as yet been given.
- Scarlet — See § Cochineal.
- Scorpion — Very common in all hot, dry, stony places; is taken as an emblem of the wicked.
- Sea gull — Its different kinds are probably signified by the word translated larus. See § Cuckoo.
- Seal — See § Badger.
- Sea monster, Lamentations 4:3, probably means such animals as the whale, porpoise, dugong, etc.
- Serpent — A generic term whereby all ophidia are designated; ten names of different species of snakes are given in the Bible.
- Shrew — So does D.V. translate the Hebr. 'anãqah, which however means rather some kind of lizard, probably the gecko.
- Siren, Isaiah 13:22, a translation for Hebrew tán, which, indicates an animal dwelling in ruins, and may generally be rendered by jackal. No other resemblance than a verbal one should be sought between this tán and the fabulous being, famous by its allurements, called Siren by the ancient poets.
- Snail should be read instead of wax in Psalm 58:9 (Vulgate: Psalm 57), to translate the Hebrew shábelûl. Unlike the snails of northern climates which hibernate, those of Israel sleep in summer. The Psalmist alludes "to the fact that very commonly, when they have secured themselves in some chink of the rocks for their summer sleep, they are still exposed to the sun rays, which gradually evaporate and dry up the whole of the body, till the animal is shrivelled to a thread, and, as it were, melted away" (Tristram).
- Sparrow — The Hebrew word çíppôr, found over 40 times, is a general name for all small passerine birds, of which there exist about 150 species in the Holy Land.
- Species — There is no recognition of classification by, or distinction according to, species in the Bible.
- Spider — An arachnid living by millions in Israel, where several hundred species have been distinguished. Its web affords a most popular illustration for frail and ephemeral undertakings (Job 8:14; Isaiah 59:5); in three passages, however, the translators seem to have wrongly written spider for moth (Psalm 39:12 (Vulgate: Psalm 38)), sigh (Psalm 90:9 (Vulgate: Psalm 89), and pieces (Hosea 8:6).
- Sponge - The Greek word σπόγγος. The reference is to an object which may or may not refer to the animal, or another object being used as a sponge to hold a liquid. In Matthew 27:48, Mark 15:36, John 19:29.
- Stork — The Hebrew word hasîdhah, erroneously rendered "heron" by the Douay translators, Lev. 11:19, alludes to the well-known affection of the stork for its young. Several passages have reference to this bird, its periodical migrations (Jeremiah 8:7), its nesting in fir-trees, its black pinions stretching from its white body (Zechariah 5:9; D.V., kite; but the stork, hasîdhah, is mentioned in the Hebrew text). Two kinds, the white and the black stork, live in Israel during the winter.
- Swallow — Two words are so rendered: derôr, "the swift flyer", which means the chimney swallow and other species akin to it Psalm 84:4 (Vulgate: Psalm 83); D.V., turtle; Proverbs 26:2; D.V., sparrow], whereas sûs or sîs may be translated as "swift", this bird being probably intended in Isaiah 38:14, and Jeremiah 8:7.
- Swan — Mentioned only in the list of unclean birds (Leviticus 11:18; Deuteronomy 14:16). The swan having always been very rare in Syria, there was little need of forbidding to eat its flesh; by the Hebrew tínshéméth, some other bird might possibly be designated.
- Swine — The most abhorred of all animals among the Jews; hence the swineherd's was the most degrading employment (Luke 15:15; cf. Matthew 8:32). Swine are very seldom kept in Israel.

=== T ===
- tachash (תַּחַשׁ tāḥaš), mentioned in the Bible, its hide was used as the top-most covering of the tabernacle.
- Tiger, Job 4:11 (Hebr., לַיִשׁ láyísh), should be "lion".
- Turtle — See § Dove.

=== U ===
- Urchin, Soph., ii, 14. See § Ericus.

=== V ===
- Viper — See § Asp.
- Vulture — So does D.V. render the Hebrew, אַיָּה ‘áyyah, Leviticus 11:14; Deuteronomy 14:13; Job, 28:7. As has been suggested above, the text of Job at least, seems to allude to the kite rather than to the vulture. Several kinds of vultures are nevertheless referred to in the Bible; so, for instance, the bearded vulture (Gypaetus barbatus), called griffon in the D.V.; the griffon vulture (Gyps fulvus), the Egyptian vulture (Neophron percnopterus), etc. In the biblical parlance vultures are often termed eagles.

=== W ===
- Waterhen — See § Porphyrion.
- Weasel, Leviticus 11:29, must be regarded as a general name, probably designating, besides the weasel proper, the polecat and ichneumon, all very common in the Holy Land.
- Whale — "And God created great whales..." (Genesis 1:21 A.V.) Hebrew Tânnîn can also be translated as "sea-monster"; porpoises and dugongs were also known to the Hebrews. In Matthew 12:40, Jesus compared his own burial to Jonah's entombment in the forestomach of a whale.
- Wild dogs, Ezekiel 13:4
- Wolf — In the Tanakh (Hebrew Bible), the Tribe and figure of Benjamin were compared to a wolf, owing to the tribe's warlike character and heroic tribal members such as King Saul and Mordecai. The description of Benjamin as a "ravening wolf," originating in Jacob's Blessing from Genesis, may also refer to the Tribe's historic jurisdiction over the Temple in Jerusalem, in which animal sacrifices were devoured by flame. In the Book of Yeshayahu (Isaiah) (11:6), the prophet predicts that in the Messianic Age, "The wolf shall dwell with the lamb..." Wolves are frequently mentioned in the New Testament as a special foe to flocks (Sirach 13:21; Matthew 7:15), and an emblem of treachery, ferocity, and bloodthirstiness. Wolves usually prowl at night around the sheepfolds, and, though fewer in numbers than jackals, are much more harmful. The modern Holy Land is home to at least 180 - 250 Indian and Arabian wolves, which are protected in Israel. See: Wolves in folklore, religion and mythology § Abrahamic traditions
- Worm — In English the translation for two Hebrew words: rímmah (Exodus 16:24; Isaiah 14:11; Job 7:5, A.V.); and tólá' (Exodus 16:20, etc.); these two Hebrew words are general; the former designates particularly all living organisms generated and swarming in decaying or rotten substances; the latter includes not only worms, but also such insects as caterpillars, centipedes, etc.
