= Eagle in Christianity =

Eagle in Christianity may refer to:

- Eagle lectern, especially in Anglican churches
- John the Evangelist, symbolised by an eagle
- The eagle in the Bible: List of animals in the Bible § E
