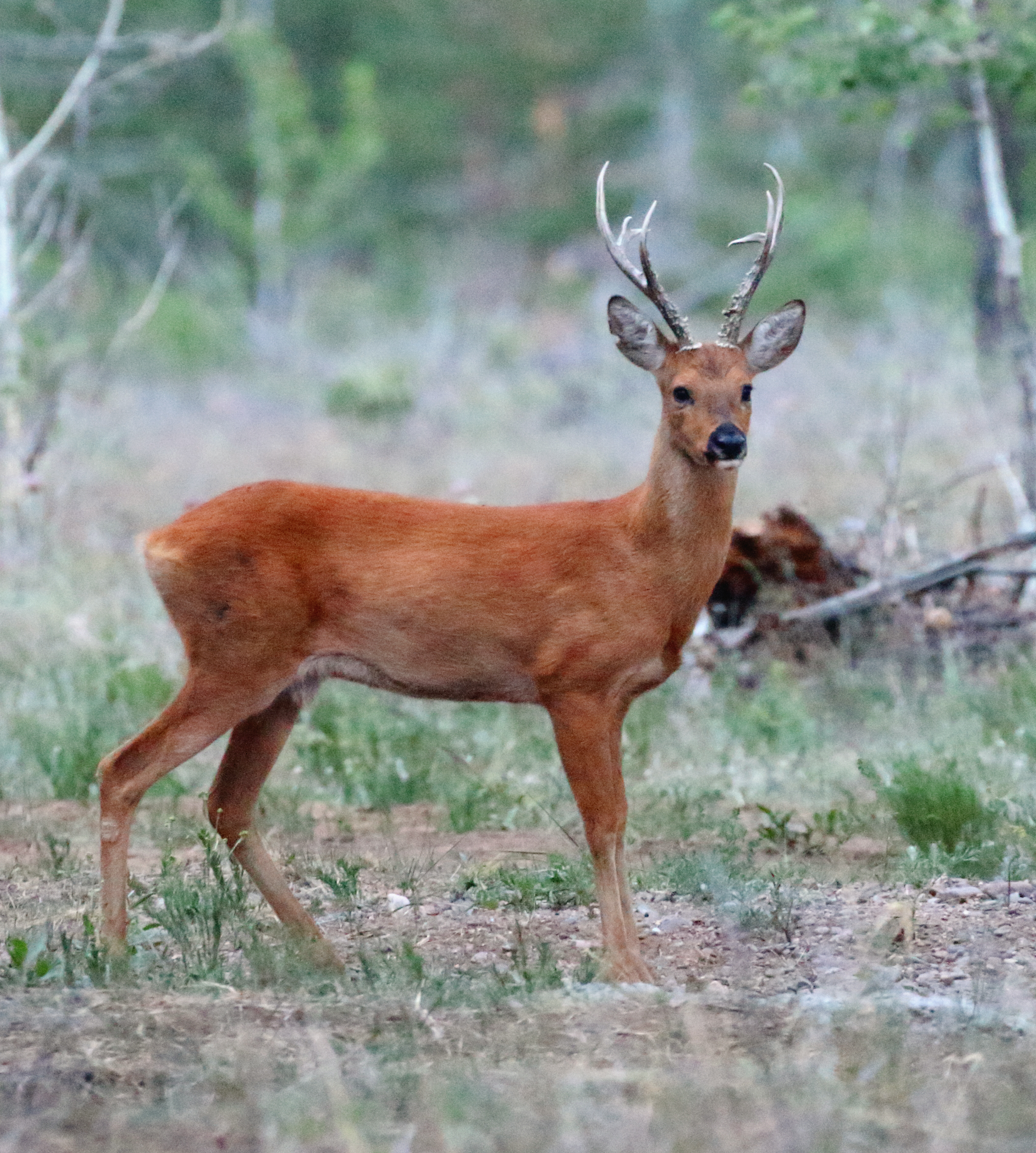
- A stag (male) at the Daursky Nature Reserve in Zabaykalsky Krai, Siberia

Conservation status
- Least Concern (IUCN 3.1)

Scientific classification
- Kingdom: Animalia
- Phylum: Chordata
- Class: Mammalia
- Order: Artiodactyla
- Family: Cervidae
- Subfamily: Capreolinae
- Genus: Capreolus
- Species: C. pygargus

Binomial name
- Capreolus pygargus (Pallas, 1771)

Subspecies
- C. p. pygargus; C. p. tianschanicus
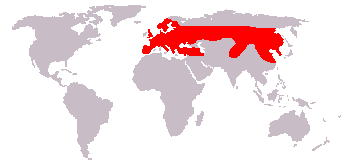
- Range of genus Capreolus (includes European roe deer)

Synonyms
- Capreolus capreolus pygargus; Capreolus bedfordi

= Siberian roe deer =

Species of deer

The Siberian roe deer, eastern roe deer, or Asian roe deer (Capreolus pygargus), is a species of roe deer found in northeastern Asia. In addition to Siberia and Mongolia, it is found in Kazakhstan, the Tian Shan Mountains of Kyrgyzstan, eastern Tibet, the Korean Peninsula and forested regions of northern China.

Its specific name pygargus, literally "white-rumped", is shared by the pygarg, an antelope known in antiquity. The name was chosen by the German biologist Peter Simon Pallas in the late 18th century. The Siberian roe deer has long antlers.

== Taxonomy ==
The Siberian roe deer was once considered to be the same species as the European roe deer (Capreolus capreolus), but it is now considered to be a separate species.

The two subspecies of the Siberian roe deer are C. p. pygargus and C. p. tianschanicus (the latter is named for the Tian Shan mountains).

== Description ==
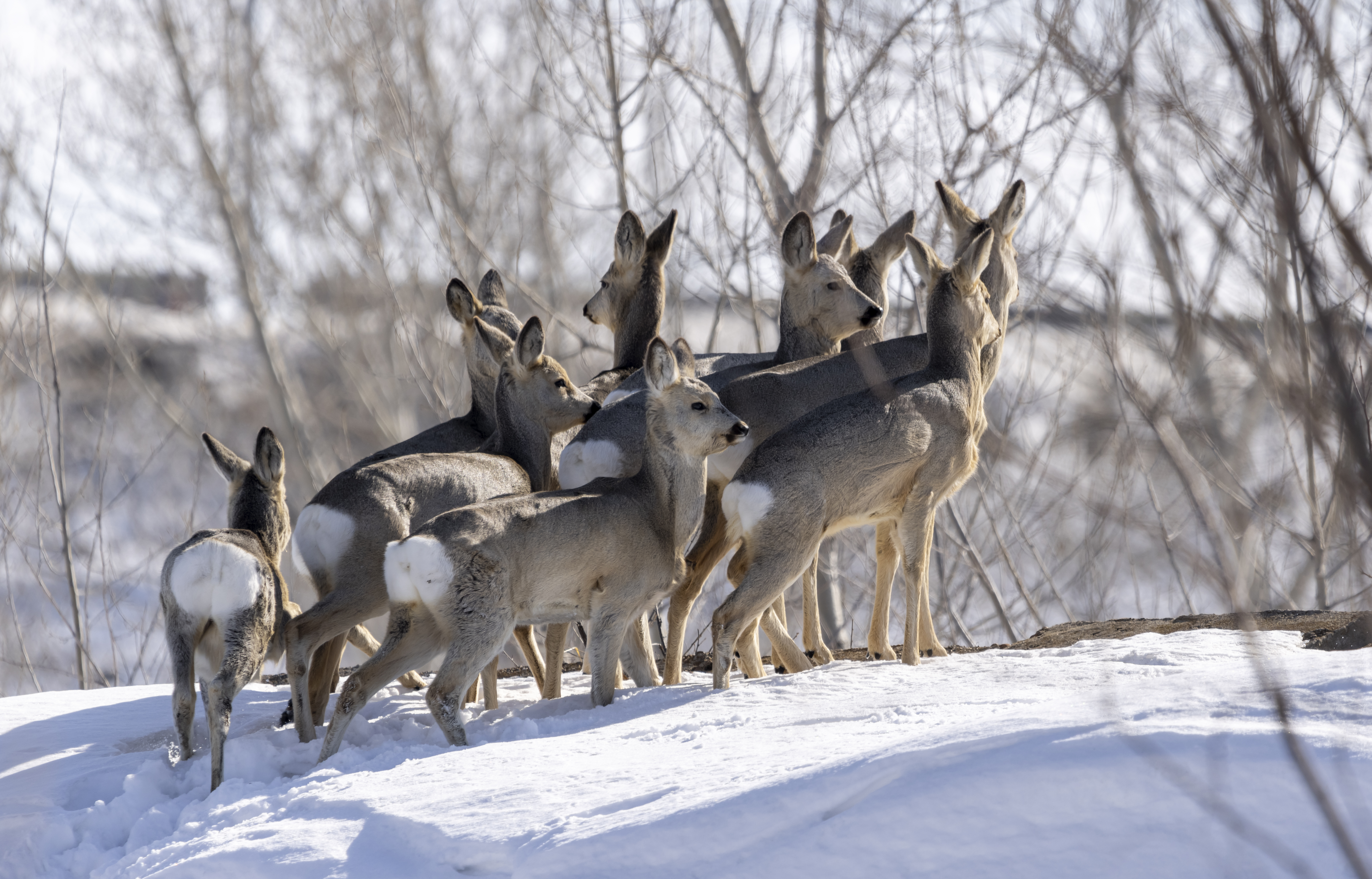
Herd of Siberian roe deer at the Irtysh river sanctuary in Kazakhstan

The Siberian roe deer is a medium-sized metacarpalian deer, with a long neck and large ears. It is typically up to 146 cm (4.8 ft) in body length and 59 kg (130 lb) in weight, making it larger than C. capreolus where populations from Ural and Northern Kazakhstan are the largest on average, followed by those from Transbaikal, Amur, and Primolskil regions. It has larger antlers with more branches than those of European roe deer. Siberian roe deer generally live about 8–12 years, with a maximum of about 18 years. In winter the northern populations exhibit light gray coloring, but their southern counterparts are grayish brown and ochraceous. The belly is creamy and the caudal patch is white. In the summer, their coloring is reddish. Young have a spotted coat. Males are larger and have three-tined antlers, widely spaced and slanting upward, which are shed in the autumn or early winter and begin to regrow shortly thereafter.

== Distribution and habitat ==
Siberian roe deer are found within the temperate zone of Eastern Europe and Central and East Asia. Fossil records show their territory once stretched to the northern Caucasus Mountains, as well as eastern Ukraine. In the late 19th and early 20th centuries, their range was diminished by overhunting in Eastern Europe, northern Kazakhstan, western Siberia, and the northern regions of eastern Siberia. Due to a division in their range, two morphologically different subspecies resulted (Tian Shan and Siberian). The Siberian and European roe deer meet at the Caucasus Mountains with the Siberian roe deer occupying the northern flank, and the European roe deer occupying the southern flank, Asia Minor, and parts of northwestern Iran.

The Siberian roe deer has a light, slender build adapted for tall, dense grass. They live in forest and steppe habitats and develop high densities in tall-grass meadows and floodplains. They are adapted to severe weather extremes.

It may have become naturalized in England for a short period in the early 20th century as an escapee from Woburn, but it was extirpated by 1945.

== Fossil record ==
Denisova Cave, the famous site of the discovery of Denisovans, has also yielded fossils of the Siberian roe deer.

== Ecology ==
=== Diet ===
The diet of the Siberian roe deer consists of over 600 species of plants – mostly herbaceous dicotyledons (58%), monocotyledons (16%), and woody species (22%). In winter, without proper sustenance, they have a lowered metabolic rate. In summer, their dietary need for sodium necessitates visits to natural salt licks. Water is usually obtained through moisture-rich foods as opposed to directly from the source.

=== Behavior ===
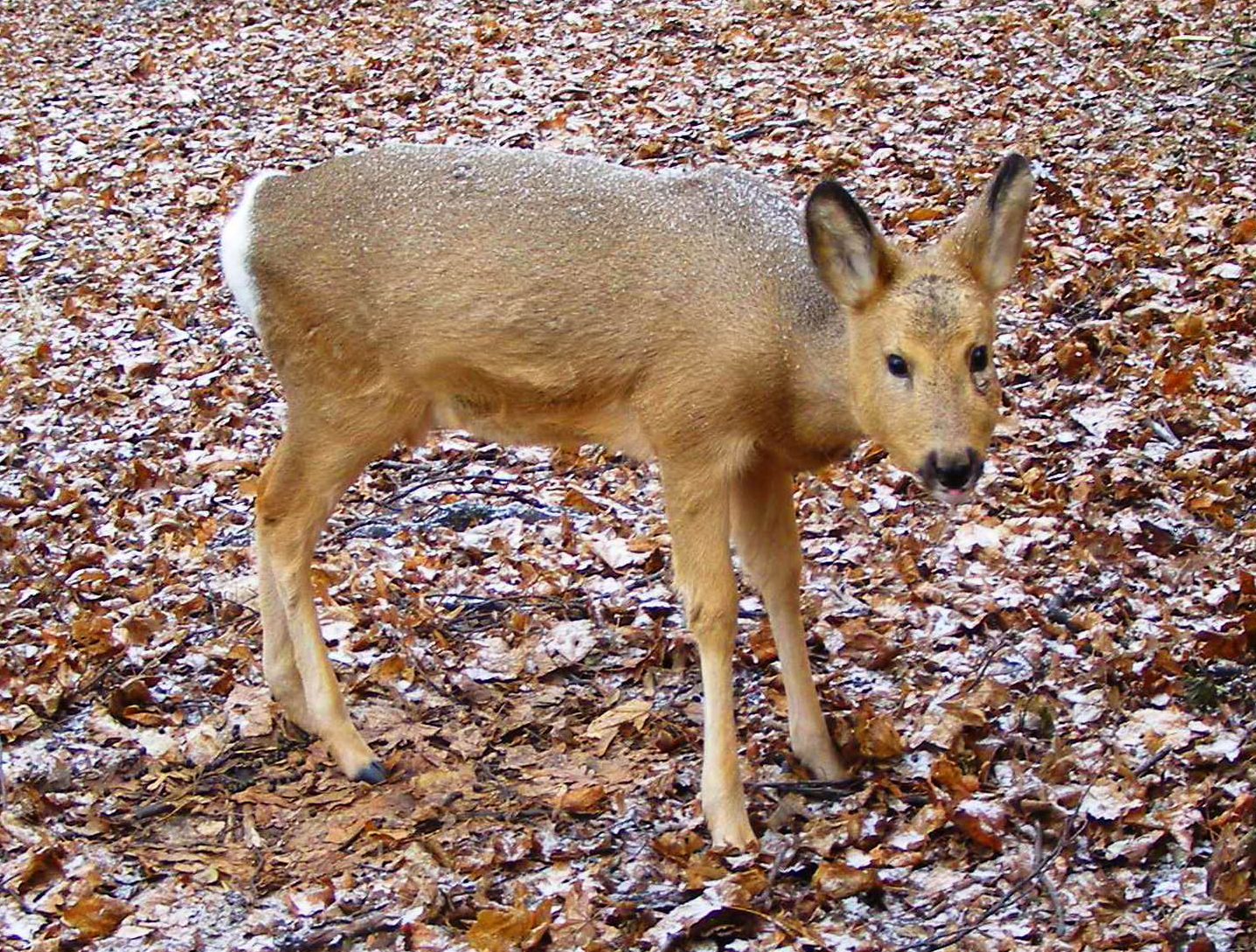
Female

Siberian roe deer can jump distances up to 15 m (49 ft), and mating occurs in August and September. Female Siberian roe deer are the only ungulates to undergo embryonic diapause. Embryonic implantation takes place in January and gestation lasts 280–300 days. Females usually have two young at a time, which are weaned after 4–5 months. Females reach sexual maturity in their first year of age but usually do not breed until their second. Males usually mate in their third year of life. The life-span of the Siberian roe deer does not usually exceed 10 years.

Males mark their territory with olfactory marks, using secretion glands on the head skin, which they rub against trees, shrubs, and high grasses, or with visual marks, by fraying trees with their antlers. Vocal signals are also a form of communication in Siberian roe deer. They have six signals: squeaking or whistling, rasping, barking, whining, screaming, and nonvocal sounds.

Some Siberian roe deer perform mass migrations.

=== Predation ===
The Siberian roe deer is preyed upon by the Amur leopard, Siberian lynx, snow leopard, Himalayan wolf, and Siberian tiger.

== Works cited ==
- Sokolov, V. E., ed. (1992). European and Siberian roe deer (in Russian). Moscow: Nauka Publishers.
