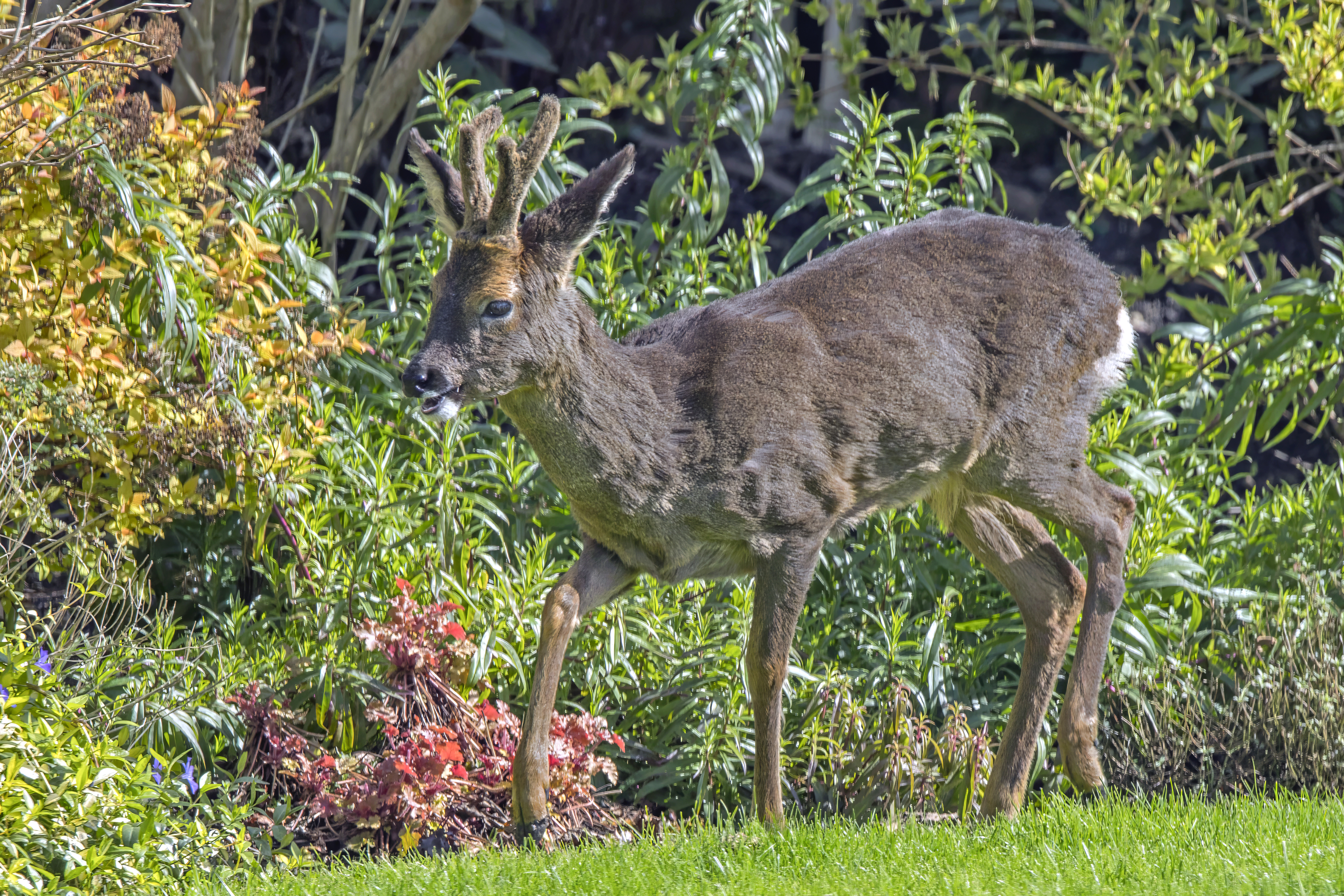
- Young male
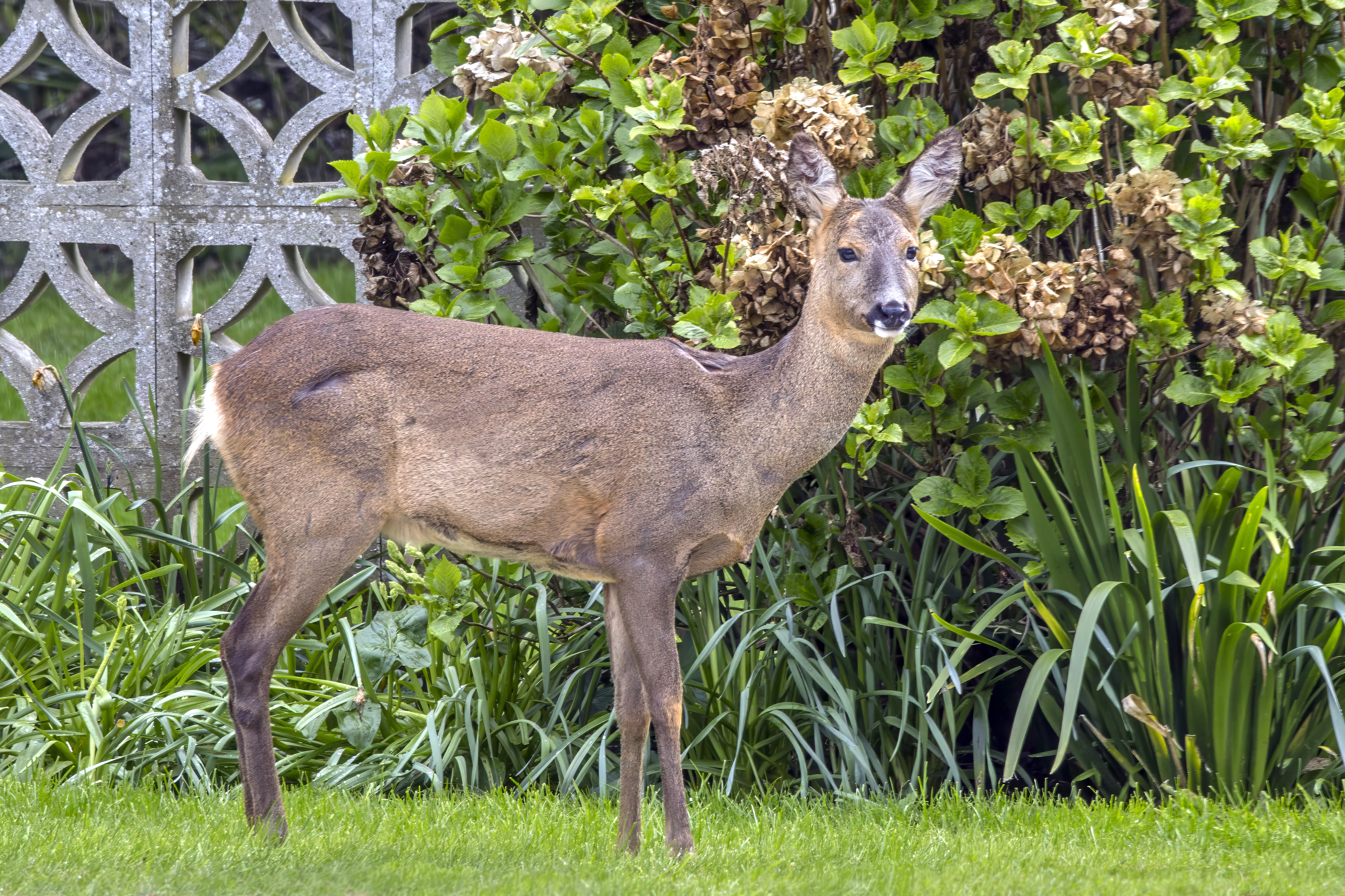
- Female both in Oxfordshire

Conservation status
- Least Concern (IUCN 3.1)

Scientific classification
- Kingdom: Animalia
- Phylum: Chordata
- Class: Mammalia
- Order: Artiodactyla
- Family: Cervidae
- Subfamily: Capreolinae
- Genus: Capreolus
- Species: C. capreolus

Binomial name
- Capreolus capreolus (Linnaeus, 1758)
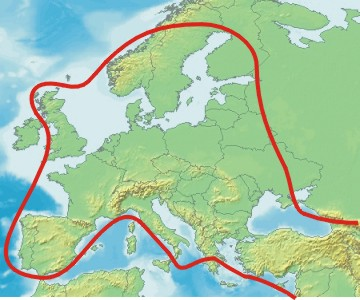
- Range of western roe deer

Synonyms
- Cervus capreolus Linnaeus, 1758

= Roe deer =

Species of deer

The roe deer (Capreolus capreolus), also known as the roe, western roe deer, or European roe, is a species of deer. The male of the species is sometimes referred to as a roebuck. The roe is a small deer, reddish and grey-brown, and well-adapted to cold environments. The species is widespread in Europe, from the Mediterranean to Scandinavia, from Scotland to the Caucasus, and east as far as northern Iran.

== Etymology ==
The English roe is from the Old English rā or rāha, from Proto-Germanic *raihô, cognate with Old Norse rá, Old Saxon rēho, Middle Dutch and Dutch ree, Old High German rēh, rēho, rēia, German Reh. It is perhaps ultimately derived from a PIE root *rei-, meaning "streaked, spotted or striped".

The word is attested on the 5th-century Caistor-by-Norwich astragalus – a roe deer talus bone, written in Elder Futhark as ᚱᚨᛇᚺᚨᚾ, transliterated as raïhan.

In the English language, this deer was originally simply called a 'roe', but over time the word 'roe' has become a qualifier, and it is now usually called 'roe deer'.

The Koiné Greek name πύγαργος, transliterated pygargos, mentioned in the Septuagint and the works of various writers such as Hesychius, Herodotus and later Pliny, was originally thought to refer to this species (in many European translations of the Bible), although it is now more often believed to refer to the addax. It is derived from the words pyge (buttocks) and argo (white).

The taxonomic name Capreolus is derived from capra or caprea, meaning 'billy goat', with the diminutive suffix -olus. The meaning of this word in Latin is not entirely clear: it may have meant 'ibex' or 'chamois'. The roe was also known as capraginus or capruginus in Latin.

== Taxonomy ==
Linnaeus first described the roe deer in the modern taxonomic system as Cervus capreolus in 1758. The initially monotypic genus Capreolus was first proposed by John Edward Gray in 1821, although he did not provide a proper description for this taxon. Gray was not actually the first to use the name Capreolus, it has been used by other authors before him. Nonetheless, his publication is seen as taxonomically acceptable. He was generally ignored until the 20th century, most 19th-century works having continued to follow Linnaeus.

Roe deer populations gradually become somewhat larger as one moves further to the east, peaking in Kazakhstan, then becoming smaller again towards the Pacific Ocean. The Soviet mammalogist Vladimir Sokolov had recognised this as a separate species from 1985 already using electrophoretic chromatography to show differences in the fractional protein content of the body tissues. Fawns, females and males make different noises between species. This new taxonomic interpretation (circumscription) was first followed in the American book Mammal Species of the World in 1993. Alexander S. Graphodatsky looked at the karyotypy to present more evidence to recognise these Russian and Asian populations as a separate species, now renamed the eastern or Siberian roe deer (C. pygargus). Populations of the roe deer from east of the Khopyor River and Don River to Korea are considered to be this species.

=== Subspecies ===
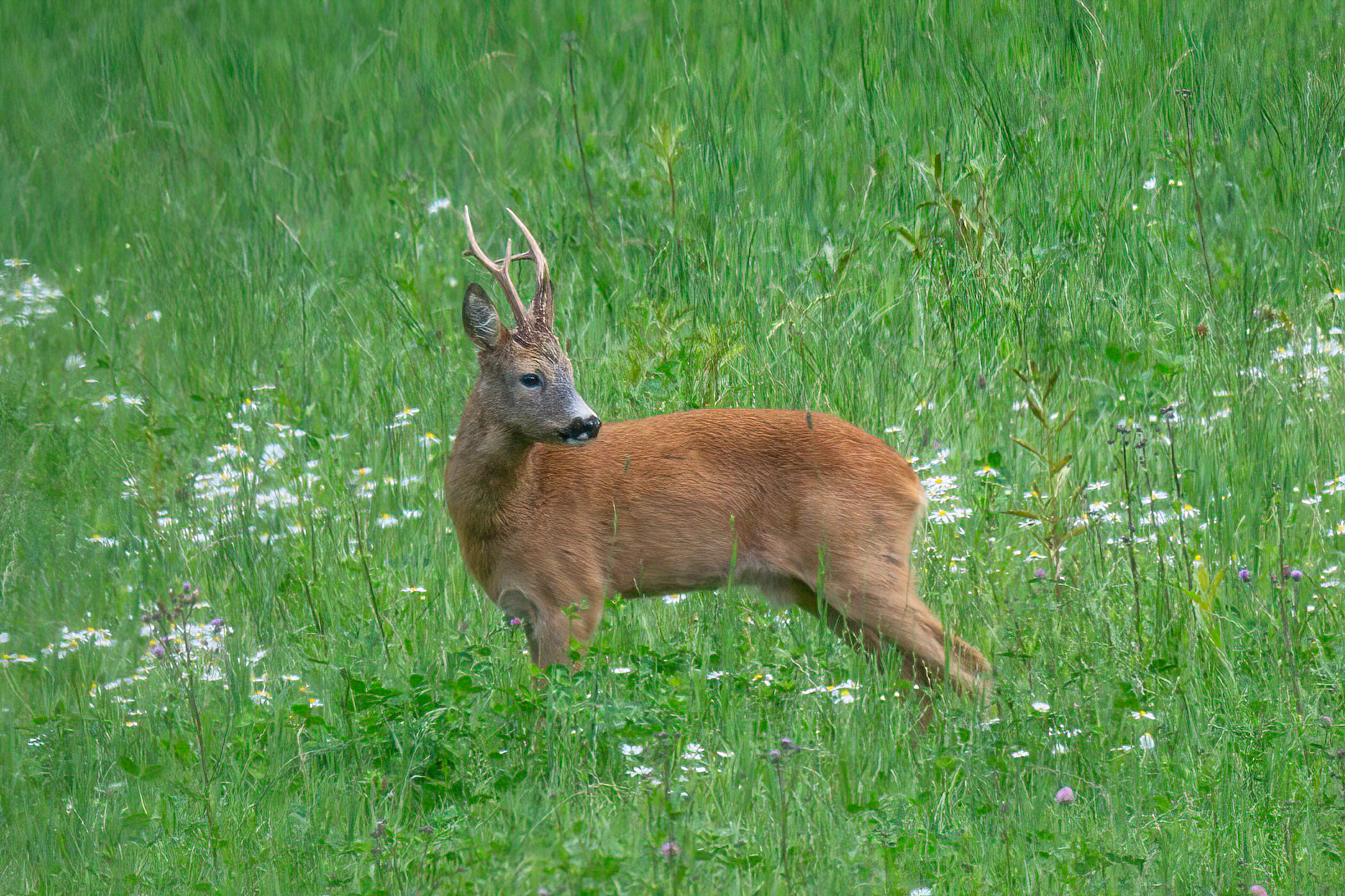
C. capreolus near Stockholm, Sweden

The Integrated Taxonomic Information System, following the 2005 Mammal Species of the World, gives the following subspecies:

- C. c. capreolus (Linnaeus, 1758)
- C. c. canus Miller, 1910 - Spain
- C. c. caucasicus Nikolay Yakovlevich Dinnik, 1910 - A large subspecies found in the region to the north of the Caucasus Mountains; although Mammal Species of the World appears to recognise the taxon, this work bases itself on a chapter by Lister et al. in the 1998 book The European roe deer: the biology of success, which only recognises the name as provisional.
- C. c. italicus Enrico Festa, 1925 - Italy

This is just one (extreme) interpretation among a number of them. Two main specialists did not recognise these taxa and considered the species to be without subspecies in 2001. The European Union's Fauna Europaea recognised in 2005 two subspecies, but besides the nominate form recognises the Spanish population as the endemic C. c. garganta Meunier, 1983.

=== Systematics ===
Roe deer are most closely related to the water deer, and, counter-intuitively, the three species in this group, called the Capreolini, are most closely related to moose and reindeer.

Although roe deer were once classified as belonging to the subfamily Cervinae, they are now classified as part of the Capreolinae, which includes the deer that developed in the New World.

=== Hybrids ===
Both the European roe deer and Siberian roe deer have seen their populations increase, both around the 1930s. In recent times, since the 1960s, the two species have become sympatric where their distributions meet, and there is now a broad 'hybridisation zone' running from the right side of the Volga River up to eastern Poland. It is extremely difficult for hunters to know which species they have bagged. In line with Haldane's rule, female hybrids of the two taxa are fertile, while male hybrids are not. Hybrids are much larger than normal and a Cesarean section was sometimes needed to birth the fawns, becoming larger than their mothers at the age of 4–5 months. F1 hybrid males may be sterile, but backcrosses with the females are possible.

22% of the animals around Moscow carry the mtDNA of the European roe deer and 78% of the Siberian. In the Volgograd region, the European roe deer predominates. In the regions of Stavropol (Russia) and Dnipropetrovsk (Ukraine), most of the deer are Siberian roe deer. In northeastern Poland there is also evidence of introgression with the Siberian roe deer, which was likely an Introduced species. In some cases, such as around Moscow, former introductions of European stock is likely responsible.

== Description ==
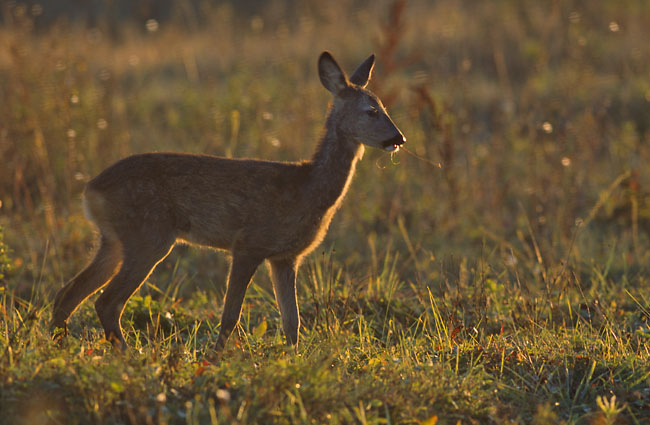
Roe deer in a grassland area

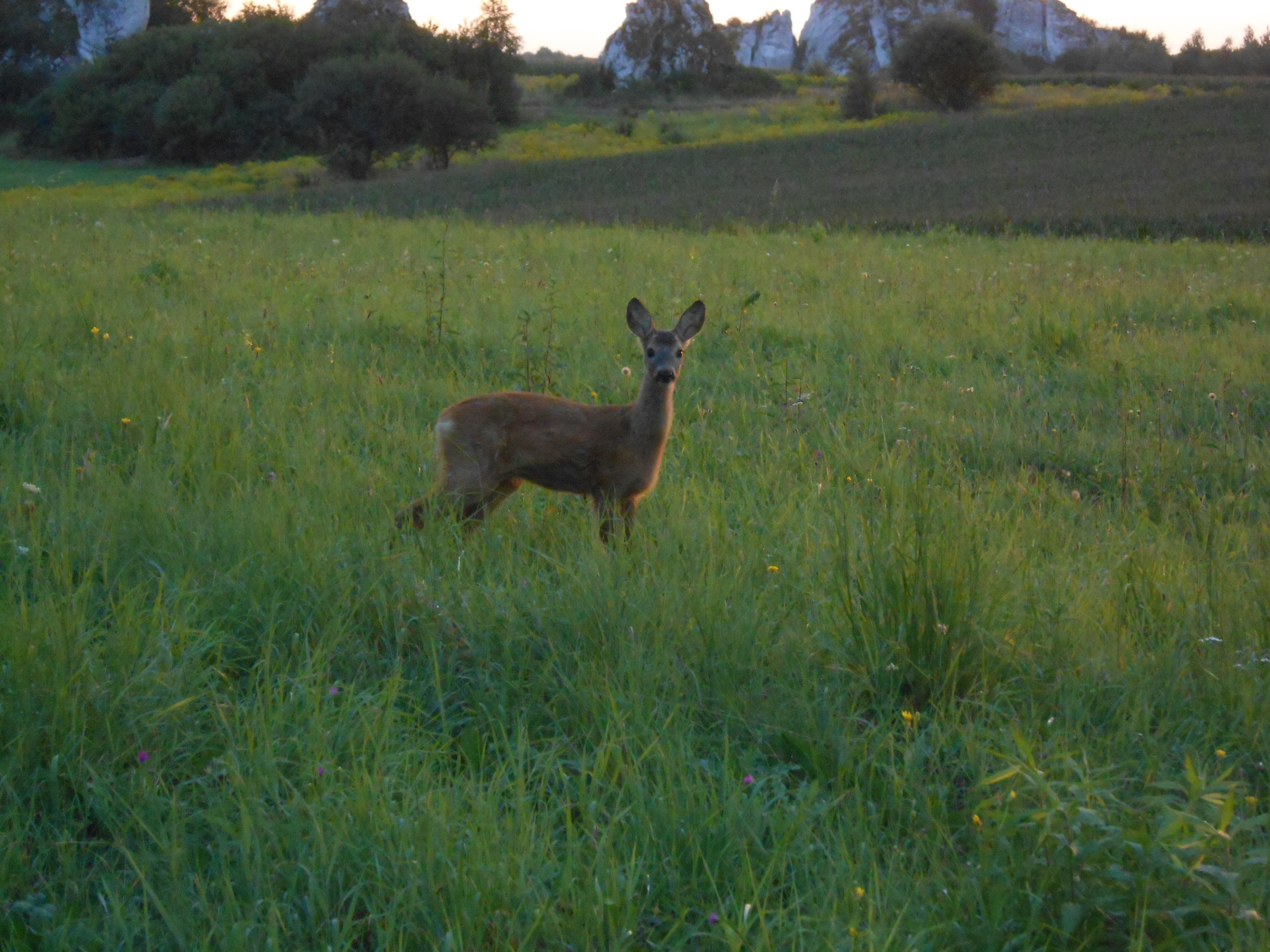
Young roe deer

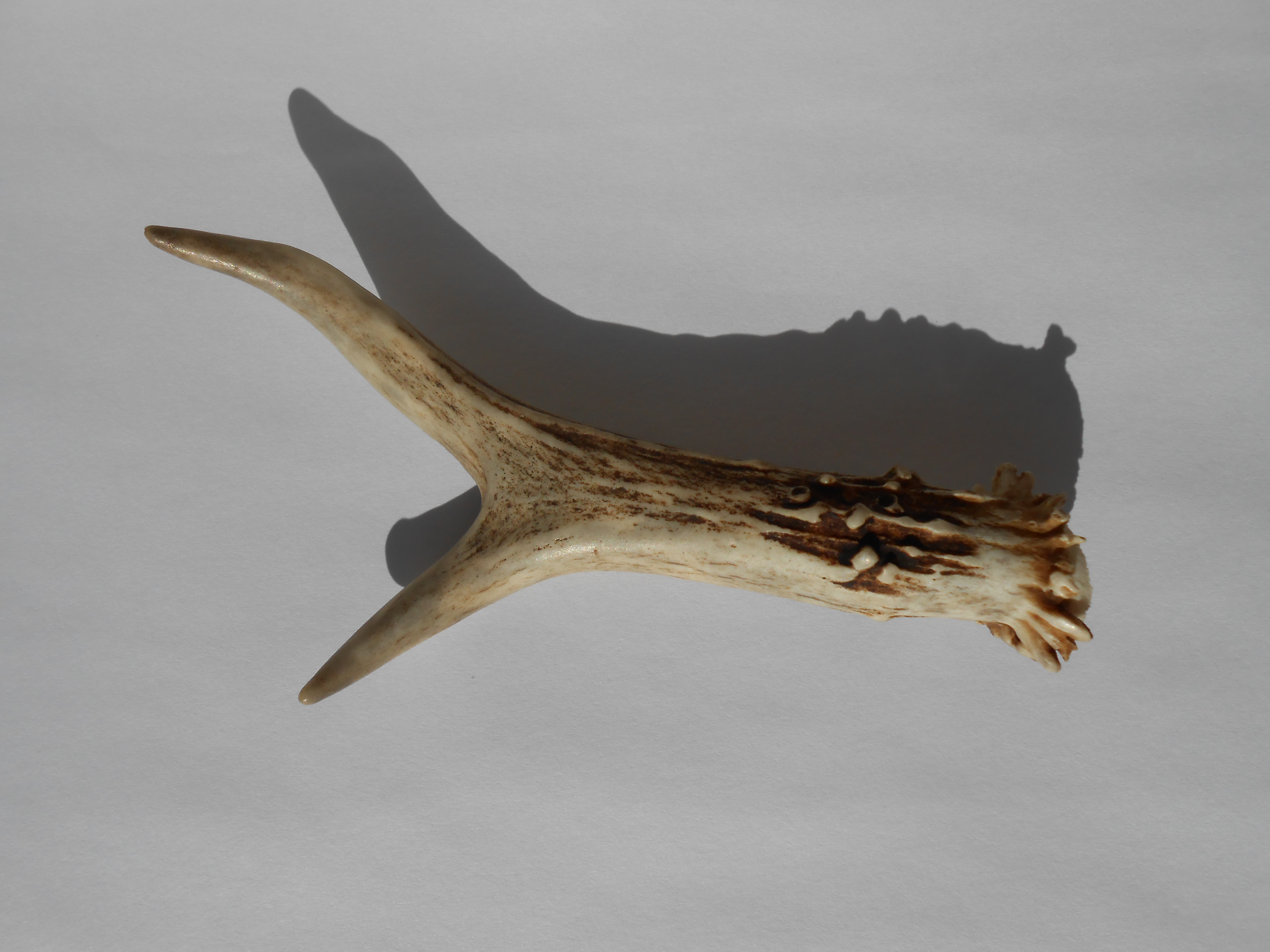
Roe deer antler

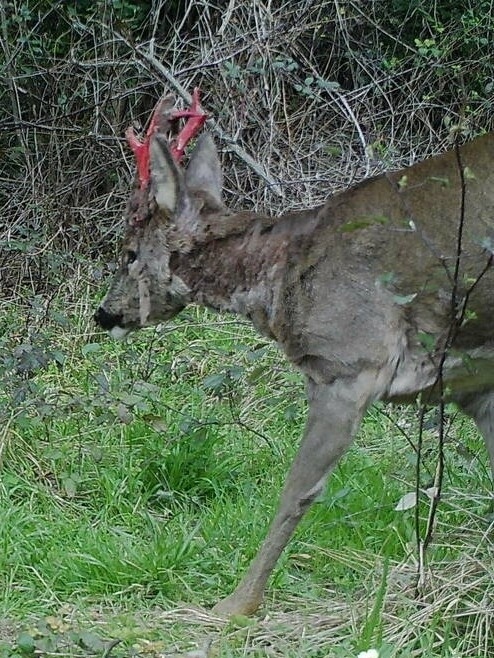
Moulting roe buck with freshly rubbed antlers

The roe deer is a relatively small deer, with a body length of 95–135 cm (3 ft 1 in – 4 ft 5 in) throughout its range, and a shoulder height of 63–67 cm (2 ft 1 in – 2 ft 2 in), and an average weight of 20–25 kg (45–55 lb). In healthy populations, where population density is restricted by hunting or predators, bucks are slightly larger than does. Under other conditions, males can be similar in size to females, or slightly smaller, with weights ranging from 15–35 kg (35–75 lb).

Bucks in good conditions develop antlers up to 20–25 cm (8–10 in) long with two or three, rarely even four, points. When the male's antlers begin to regrow, they are covered in a thin layer of velvet-like fur which they shed later on after the hair's blood supply is lost. Males may speed up the process by rubbing their antlers on trees, so that their antlers are hard and stiff for the duels during the mating season. Unlike most cervids, roe deer begin regrowing antlers almost immediately after they are shed. In rare cases, some bucks possess only a single antler branch, the result of a genetic defect.

== Distribution ==
The roe deer is found in most areas of Europe, with the exception of northernmost Scandinavia, Iceland, Ireland, and the islands of the Mediterranean Sea. In the Mediterranean region, it is largely confined to mountainous areas, and is absent or rare at low altitudes. There is an early Neolithic fossil record from Jordan.

=== Belgium ===
In Flanders the roe deer was mostly confined to the hilly regions in the east, but like in neighbouring countries the population has expanded in recent times. A theory is that the expansion of maize cultivation, which are higher than traditional crops and afford more shelter, has aided their expansion to the west.

=== Britain ===
In England and Wales, roe deer have experienced a substantial expansion in their range in the latter half of the 20th century and continuing into the 21st century. This increase in population also appears to be affecting woodland ecosystems. At the start of the 20th century, they were almost extirpated in Southern England, but since then have hugely expanded their range, mostly due to restrictions and decrease in hunting, increases in forests and reductions in arable farming, changes in agriculture (more winter cereal crops), a massive reduction in extensive livestock husbandry, and a general warming climate over the past 200 years. Furthermore, there are no longer any large predators in Britain.

In some cases, roe deer have been introduced with human help. In 1884 roe deer were introduced from Württemberg in Germany into the Thetford Forest, and these spread to populate most of Norfolk, Suffolk, and substantial parts of Cambridgeshire. In southern England, they started their expansion in Sussex (possibly from enclosed stock in Petworth Park) and from there soon spread into Surrey, Berkshire, Wiltshire, Hampshire, and Dorset, and for the first half of the 20th century, most roe deer in Southern England were to be found in these counties. By the end of the 20th century, they had repopulated much of southern England and had expanded into Somerset, Devon, Cornwall, Oxfordshire, Gloucestershire, Warwickshire, Lincolnshire and South Yorkshire, and had even spread into Wales from the Ludlow area where an isolated population had appeared. At the same time, the surviving population in Scotland and the Lake District had pushed further south beyond Yorkshire and Lancashire and into Derbyshire and Humberside.

In the 1970s, the species was still completely absent from Wales. Roe deer can now be found in most of rural England except for southeast Kent and parts of Wales; anywhere in the UK mainland suitable for roe deer may have a population. Not being a species that needs large areas of woodland to survive, urban roe deer are now a feature of several cities, notably Glasgow and Bristol, where in particular they favour cemeteries. In Wales, they are least common, but they are reasonably well established in Powys and Monmouthshire.

=== Iran ===
Roe deer are found in northern Iran in the Caspian region: they occur in the Hyrcanian woodlands and agricultural lands of the Alborz Mountains (Golestan National Park, Jahan Nama Protected Area).

=== Ireland ===
Scottish roe deer were introduced to the Lissadell Estate in County Sligo in Ireland around 1870 by Sir Henry Gore-Booth. The Lissadell roe deer were noted for their occasional abnormal antlers and survived in that general area for about 50 years before they died out. According to the National Biodiversity Data Centre, in 2014 there was a confirmed sighting of roe deer in County Armagh. There have been other, unconfirmed, sightings in County Wicklow.

=== The Netherlands ===
In the Netherlands, roe deer were extirpated from the entirety of the country except for two small areas around 1875. As new forests were planted in the country in the 20th century, the population began to expand rapidly. Although it was a protected species in 1950, the population is no longer considered threatened and it has lost legal protection. As of 2016 there are some 110,000 roe deer in the country. The population is primarily kept in check through the efforts of hunters.

=== Israel ===
In 1991, a breeding colony of 27 roe deer coming from France, Hungary and Italy were brought in the Hai-Bar Carmel Reserve. A small number of this roe deer population has been reintroduced to the Carmel Mountains from the Carmel Hai-Bar Nature Reserve, with the first deer being released in 1996. 24 to 29 animals had been released by 2006. Some of the reintroduced animals were hand-reared and could be monitored by their responses to their keeper calls.

== Ecology ==
=== Habitat ===
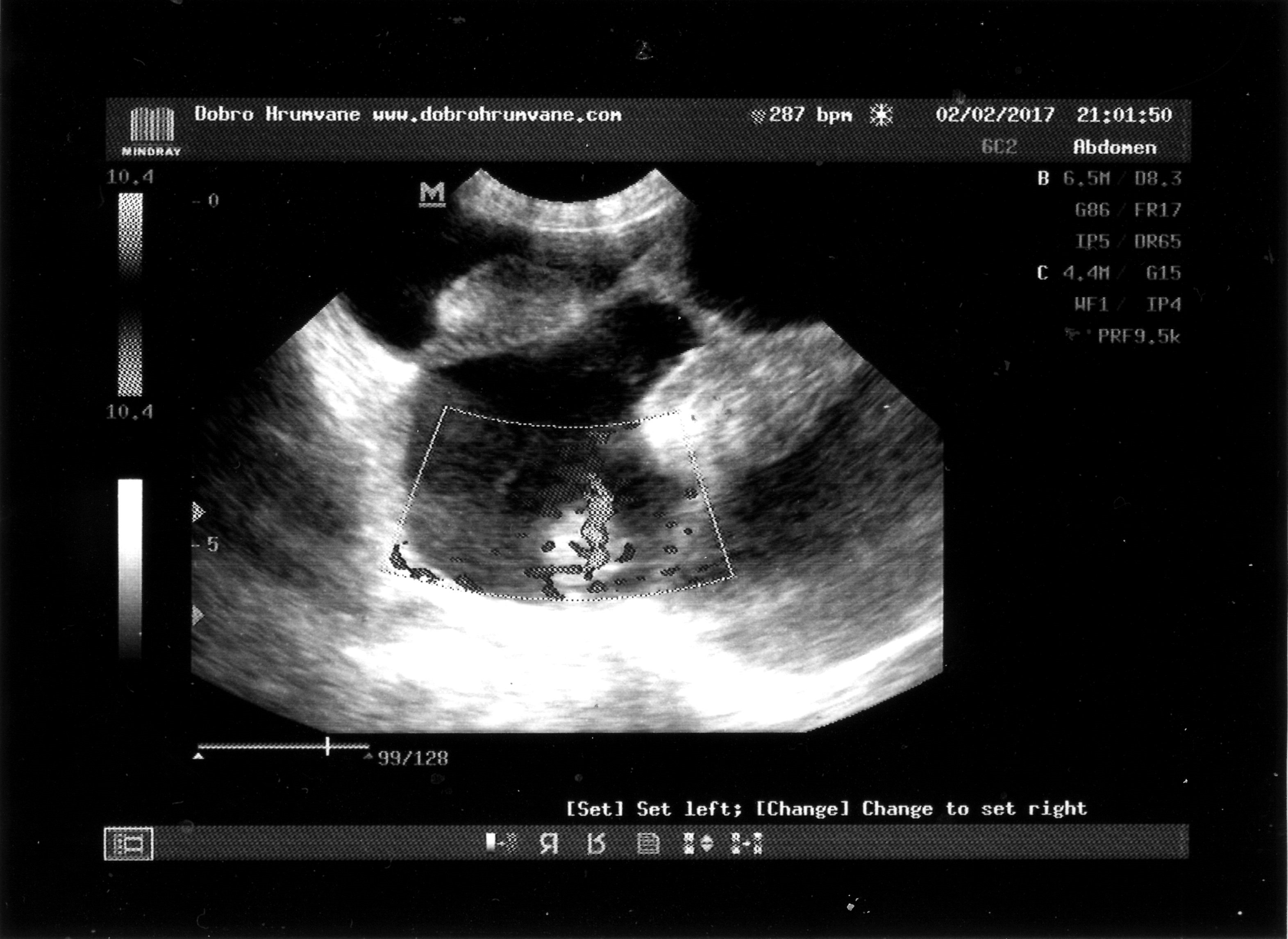
Ultrasonography of the uterine pregnancy of a roe deer in Bulgaria

This species is found across multiple habitats, including open agricultural areas and above the tree line, but a requisite factor is access to food and cover. It retreats to dense woodland, especially among conifers, or bramble scrub when it must rest, but it is very opportunistic and a hedgerow may be good enough. Roe deer in the southern Czech Republic live in almost completely open agricultural land. The animal is more likely to be spotted in places with nearby forests to retreat to. A pioneer species commonly associated with biotic communities at an early stage of succession, during the Neolithic period in Europe when farming humans began to colonise the continent from the Middle East, the roe deer was abundant, taking advantage of areas of forest or woodland cleared by Neolithic farmers.

=== Behaviour ===
In order to mitigate risk, roe deer remain within refuge habitats (such as forests) during the day. They are likelier to venture into more open habitats at night and during crepuscular periods when there is less ambient activity. It scrapes leaf litter off the ground to make a 'bed'.

When alarmed it will bark a sound much like a dog and flash out its white rump patch. Rump patches differ between the sexes, with the white rump patches heart-shaped on females and kidney-shaped on males. Males may also bark or make a low grunting noise. Does (the females) make a high-pitched "pheep" whine to attract males during the rut (breeding season) in July and August. Initially the female goes looking for a mate and commonly lures the buck back into her territory before mating. The roe deer is territorial, and while the territories of a male and a female might overlap, other roe deer of the same sex are excluded unless they are the doe's offspring of that year.

=== Diet ===
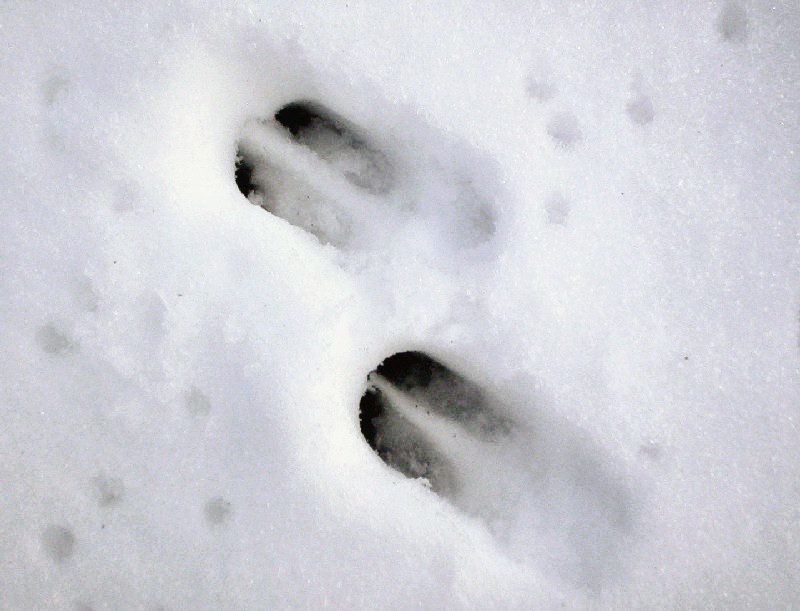
Roe deer tracks

It feeds mainly on grass, leaves, berries, and young shoots. It particularly likes very young, tender grass with a high moisture content, i.e., grass that has received rain the day before. Roe deer will generally not venture into a field that has or has had livestock in it.

=== Reproduction ===
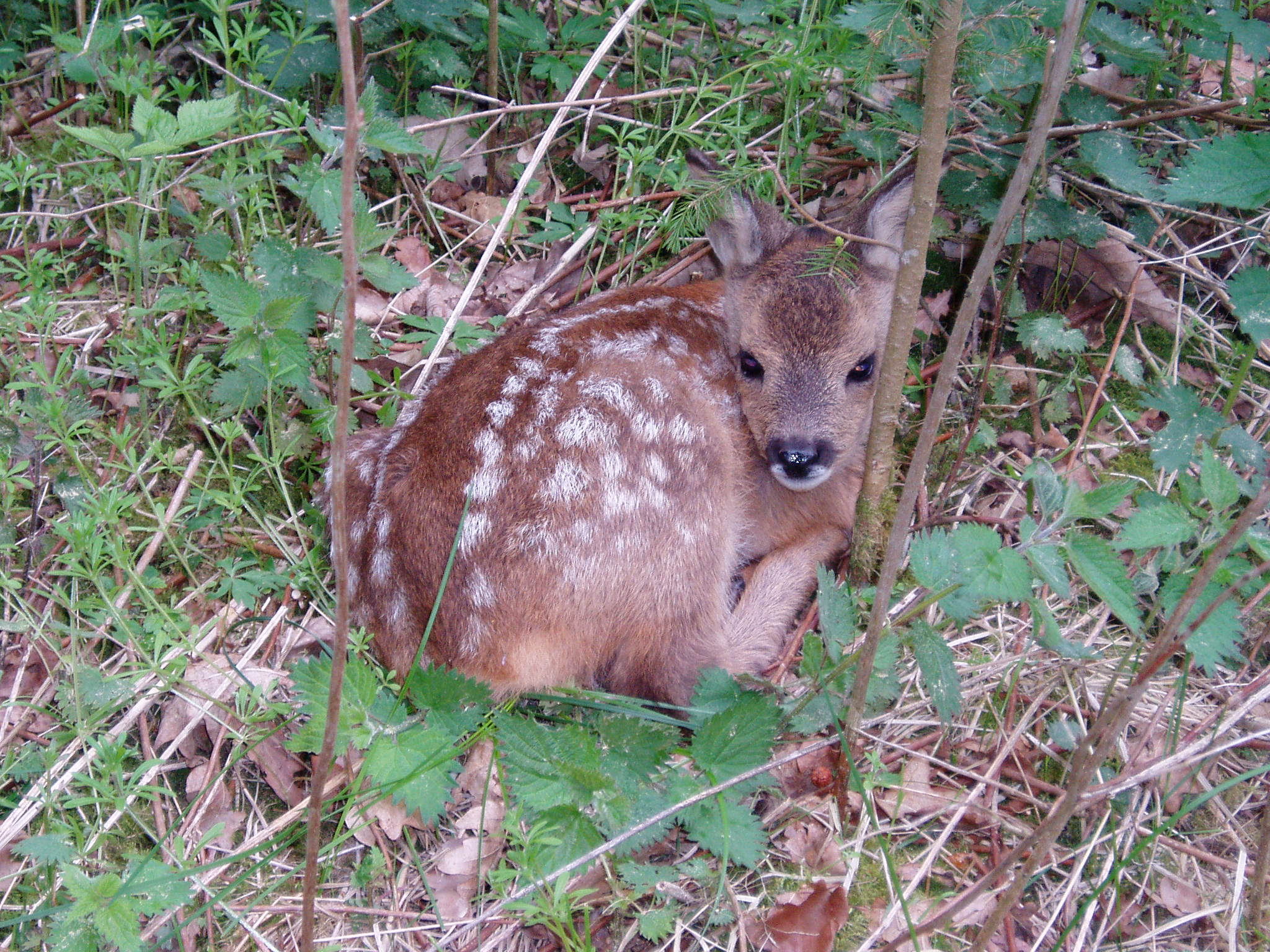
Roe deer fawn, two to three weeks old

The polygamous roe deer males clash over territory in early summer and mate in early autumn. During courtship, when the males chase the females, they often flatten the underbrush, leaving behind areas of the forest in the shape of a circle or figure eight called 'roe rings'. These tend to be 1–3 m (3.3–9.8 ft) in diameter. In 1956 it was speculated based on some field evidence that they choose where to form rings around plants with ergot mould, but this has not been substantiated further. Males may also use their antlers to shovel around fallen foliage and soil as a way of attracting a mate. Roebucks enter rutting inappetence during the July and August breeding season. Females are monoestrous and after delayed implantation usually give birth the following June, after a 10-month gestation period, typically to two spotted fawns of opposite sexes, weighing 0.8–2.5 kg (1.8–5.5 lb). The fawns remain hidden in long grass from predators; they are suckled by their mother several times a day for around three months. Young female roe deer can begin to reproduce when they are around six months old. During the mating season, a male roe deer may mount the same doe several times over a duration of several hours.

=== Population ecology ===
A roe deer can live up to 20 years, but it usually does not reach such an age. A normal life span in the wild is seven to eight years, or ten years.

The roe deer population shows irruptive growth. It is extremely fecund and can double its population every year; it shows a retarded reaction to population density with females continuing to have a similar fecundity at high population densities.

Population structure is modified by available nutrition, where populations are irrupting there are few animals over six years old. Where populations are stagnant or moribund, there is huge fawn mortality and a large part of the population is over seven years old. Mortality is highest in the first weeks after birth due to predation, or sometimes farm machinery; or in the first winter due to starvation or disease, with up to 90% mortality.

=== Community ecology ===
It is a main prey of the Persian leopard (Panthera pardus tulliana) in the Alborz Mountains of Iran.

The nematode Spiculopteragia asymmetrica infects this deer.

Compared to the other large herbivores and omnivores in Iran, it is a poor disperser of plant seeds, despite consuming relatively more of them.

== Uses ==
The roe deer is a game animal of great economic value in Europe, providing large amounts of meat and generating substantial revenues from in sport hunting activity. In 1998, some 2,500,000 roe deer were shot in western Europe. In Germany during the 1990s, 700,000 were taken per year. As this is insufficient to slow its population growth, the roe deer continues to increase in number.

It is the main source of venison in Europe. The meat, like most game meat, is darker in colour than that of most farm-raised deer.

== Palaeontology ==
Roe deer are thought to have evolved from a species in the Eurasian genus Procapreolus, with some 10 species occurring from the Late Miocene to the Early Pleistocene, which moved from the east to Central Europe over the millennia, where Procapreolus cusanus (also classified as Capreolus cusanus) occurred. It may not have evolved from C. cusanus, however, because the two extant species split from each other 1.375 and 2.75 Myr ago, and the western species first appeared in Europe 600 thousand years ago.

As of 2008, over 3,000 fossil specimens of this species had been recovered from Europe, which affords a good set of data to elucidate the prehistoric distribution. The distribution of the European species has fluctuated often since entering Europe. During some periods of the last ice age, it was present in central Europe, but during the Last Glacial Maximum it retreated to refugia in the Iberian Peninsula (two refugia here), southern France, Italy (likely two), the Balkans and the Carpathians. When the last Ice Age ended, the species initially abruptly expanded north of the Alps to Germany during the Greenland Interstadial, 12.5–10.8 thousand years ago, but during the cooling of the Younger Dryas, 10.8–10 thousand years ago, it appears to have disappeared again from this region. It reappeared 9.7–9.5 thousand years ago, reaching northern central Europe. The modern population in this area appears to have recolonised it from the Carpathians and/or further east, but not the Balkans or other refugia. This is opposite to the red deer, which recolonised Europe from Iberia. There has been much admixture of these populations where they meet, also possibly due to human intervention in some cases.

It is thought that during the Middle Ages the roe deer and Siberian roe deer were kept apart due to hunting pressure and an abundance of predators; the two species may have encountered each other in the period just prior, though during the Pleistocene they were also kept apart.

== Conservation ==
Populations are increasing throughout Europe; it is considered a least-concern species by the International Union for the Conservation of Nature.

== Culture ==
In the Hebrew Bible Deuteronomy 14:5, the יַחְמ֑וּר, yahmur, derived from 'to be red', is listed as the third species of animal that may be eaten. In most Bibles this word has usually been translated as 'roe deer', and it still means as much in Arabic (أحمر, pronounced 'ahmar) -it was still said to be a common species in the Mount Carmel area in the 19th century. The King James Bible translated the word as 'fallow deer', and in other English Bible translations the word has been translated as a number of different species.

Bambi, the titular character of the book Bambi, A Life in the Woods and its sequel Bambi's Children was originally a roe deer. When the story was adapted to the animated film Bambi by Walt Disney Pictures, the main character was changed to a white-tailed deer.

Albino roe deer were exceedingly rare in history, and they were regarded as national treasures or sacred animals in ancient times in China.
