= Tree snake =

Tree snake is a common name for several snakes and may refer to:

- Boiga irregularis, the brown tree snake, native to Australia, Indonesia, and New Guinea, and notable as an invasive species in Guam
- Dendrelaphis, a genus of snakes known as "tree snakes" in Australia
- Imantodes, a genus of snakes native to Central and South America
