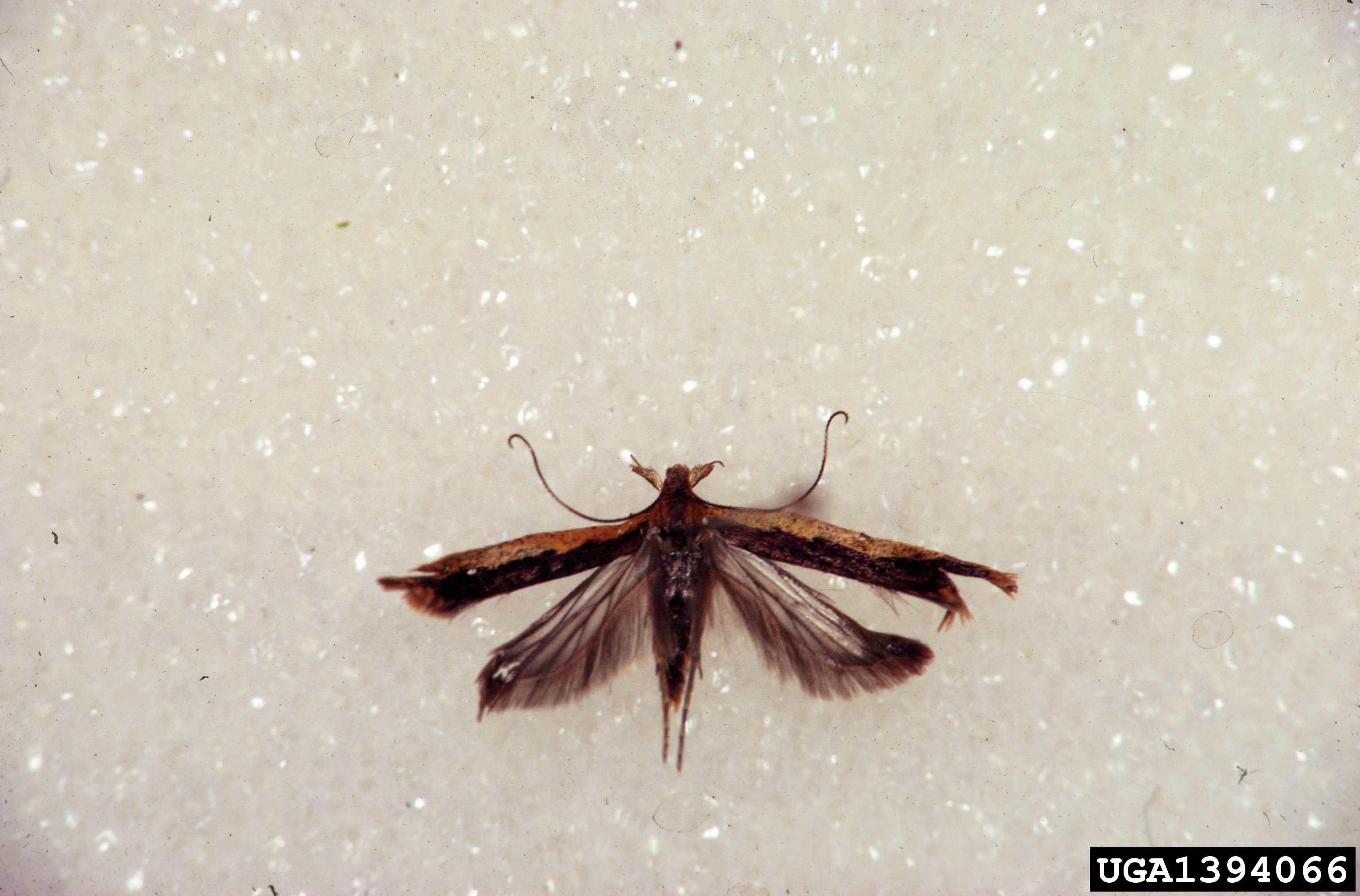

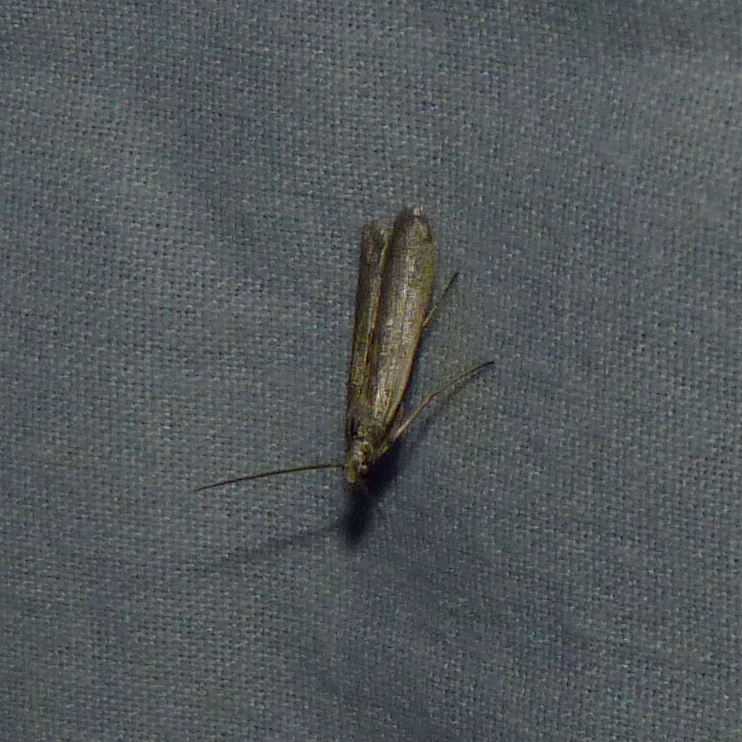

Scientific classification
- Kingdom: Animalia
- Phylum: Arthropoda
- Class: Insecta
- Order: Lepidoptera
- Family: Gelechiidae
- Genus: Dichomeris
- Species: D. ligulella

Binomial name
- Dichomeris ligulella Hübner, 1818

Synonyms
- Elasmion ligulella Hübner, 1808; Rhinosia pometella Harris, 1853; Chaetochilus conturbatellus Fitch, 1853; Ypsolophus contubernatellus Fitch, 1853; Chaetochilus malifoliellus Fitch, 1856; Ypsolophus pauciguttellus Clemens, 1863; Ypsolophus flavivittellus Clemens, 1864; Ypsolophus quercipominella Chambers, 1872; Ypsolophus reedella Chambers, 1872

= Dichomeris ligulella =

Species of moth

Dichomeris ligulella, the palmerworm, is a moth of the family Gelechiidae. It is found in eastern North America.

The wingspan is 15–18 mm. Adults are on wing from April to October. There is one generation per year.

The larvae feed on apple, hackberry, hazel and oak.
