= Chol (Bible) =

Sand

Chol (Hebrew: חוֹל ḥōl) is a word mentioned in Job 29:18 in the Masoretic text of the Hebrew Bible, by some traditionally understood as the Hebrew word for "phoenix".

The Leningrad Codex reads:

אֹמַר עִם־קִנִּ֣י אֶגְוָ֑ע וְ֝כַח֗וֹל אַרְבֶּ֥ה יָמִֽים׃
’omar ‘im-qinni ’egva‘; vekhachol, ’arbeh yamim.

— Job 29:18 (WLC)

The Greek Septuagint (circa 200 BCE) used the Ancient Greek expression στέλεχος φοίνικος (stélechos phoínikos, "stem/trunk of a palm tree") when rendering Hebrew ḥōl in Job 29, which the Latin Vulgate (circa 400 CE) interpreted as palma (Latin for "palm tree"). The Greek term φοῖνιξ ambiguously denotes both the palm tree and the phoenix, the former being a far more common term.

Roelof Van den Broek (1971) believed that "sand" was the most appropriate interpretation of the term ḥōl in Job 29:18, following the common meaning of ḥōl in Hebrew. On his interpretation, "multiply my days like the sand" must be a metaphor for a long life. On the other hand, Mitchell Dahood (1974) argued in favor of the interpretation "phoenix" on the basis of parallels between Job and Ugaritic texts. In particular, the Ugaritic line ḥl rḥb mknpt "phoenix broad of wingspread" strongly points to an Ugaritic noun ḥl "phoenix", as "sand" does not fit this context. Ugaritic ḥl "phoenix" is cognate to Hebrew ḥōl.

The Rabbis preserved the original understanding of the word ḥōl as referring to the phoenix. The school of R. Jannai said: "[the ḥōl] lives a thousand years and at the end of thousand years a fire issues from its nest and burns it until as much as an egg is left of it. Then it grows limbs again and lives." R. Judan b. Simon said: "it lives a thousand years and at the end of thousand years its body is consumed and its wings crumble to pieces until as much as an egg of it is left. Then it grows limbs again and lives."
