= Pygarg =

Biblical animal

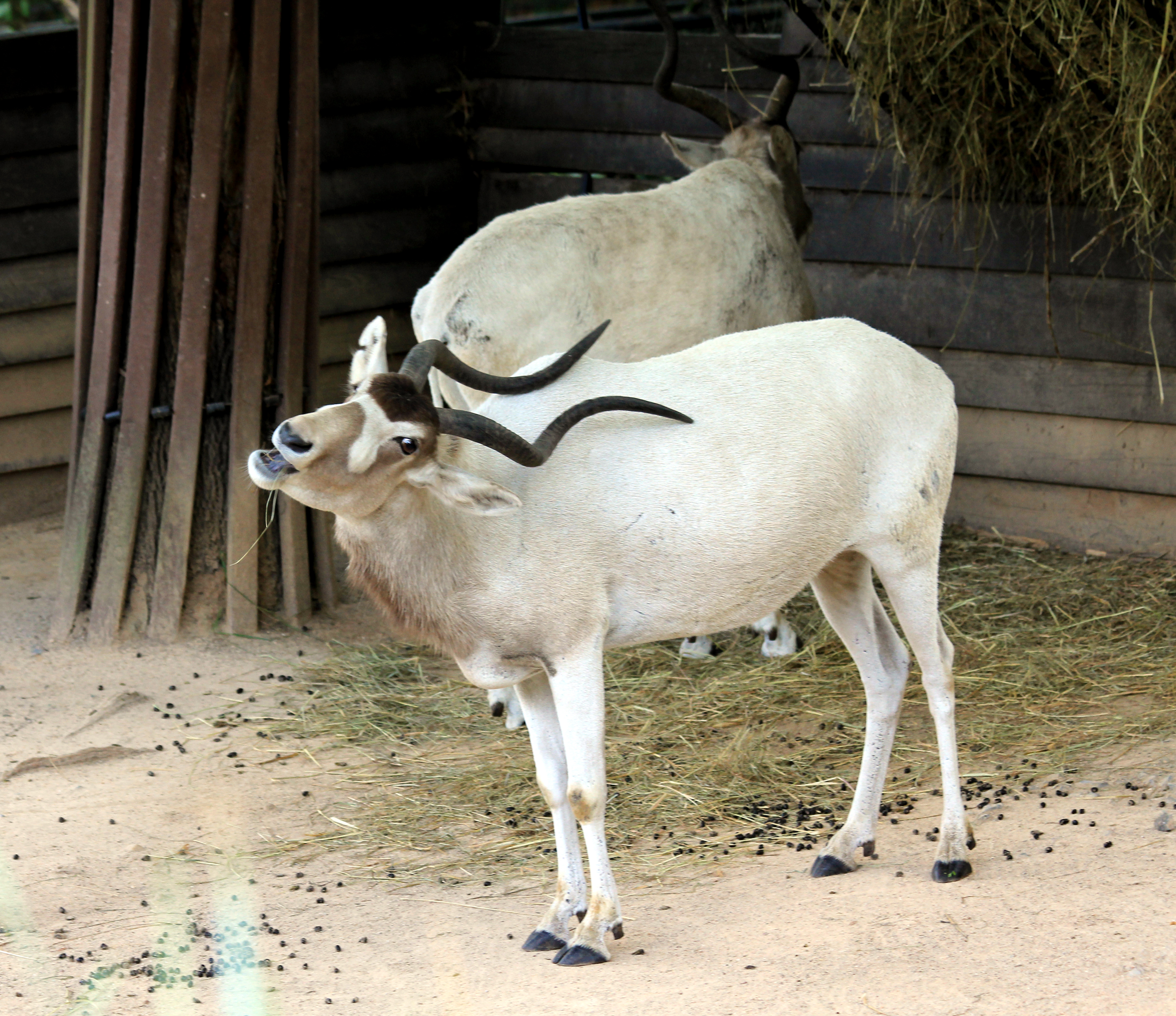
The addax (Addax nasomaculatus), possibly the original dishon/pygarg.

The pygarg (/ˈpaɪɡɑːrɡ/) is an animal mentioned in the Bible in Deuteronomy 14:5 as one of the animals permitted for food. The Septuagint translates the Hebrew yachmur (יחמור) as pygargos in Koiné Greek ("white-rumped", from pyge "buttocks" and argo "white"), and the King James Version takes from there its term pygarg.

Henry Baker Tristram (1867) proposed that the pygarg was the Saharan antelope addax and described it as "a large animal, over 3 1/2 feet [1 m] high at the shoulder, and, with its gently-twisted horns, 2 1/2 feet [80 cm] feet long. Its colour is pure white, with the exception of a short black mane, and a tinge of tawny on the shoulders and back".

Outside the biblical use, the term was also applied to the Siberian roe deer in the 18th century, whose specific name is pygargus in scientific Latin. This deer, like other roe deer, has a white rump, which is consistent with the Septuagint translation while the addax is all-white during the summer (rather than just having a white rump).
