= Pleistocene rewilding =

Ecological practice

Pleistocene rewilding is the advocacy of the reintroduction of extant Pleistocene megafauna, or the close ecological equivalents of extinct megafauna. It is an extension of the conservation practice of rewilding, which aims to restore functioning, self-sustaining ecosystems through practices that may include species reintroductions.

== Background ==
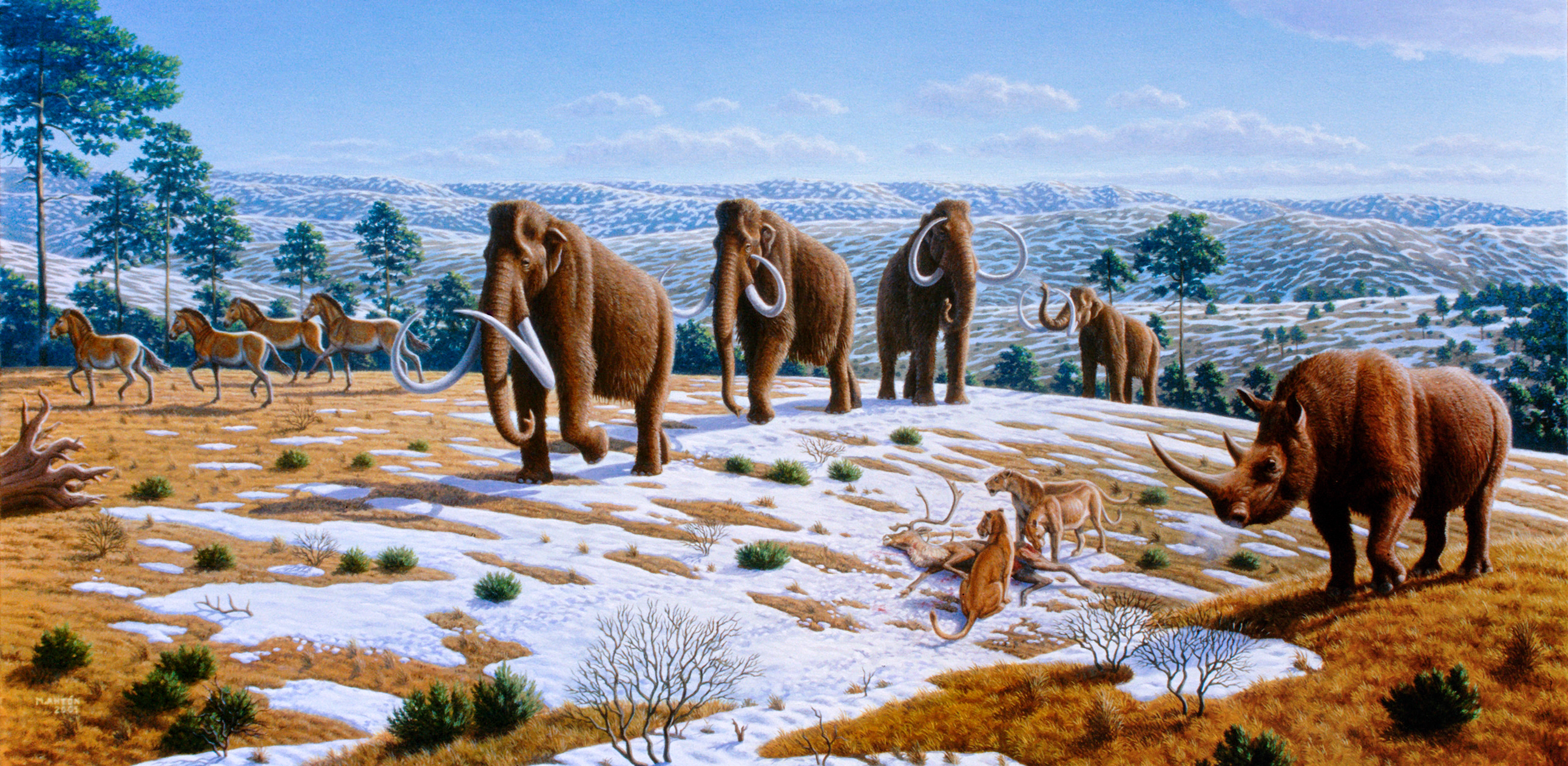
Megafauna of the Pleistocene mammoth steppe.

Towards the end of the Pleistocene era (roughly 13,000 to 10,000 years ago), nearly all megafauna of Eurasia, Australia, and South/North America, dwindled towards extinction, in what has been referred to as the Quaternary extinction event. With the loss of large herbivores and predator species, niches important for ecosystem functioning were left unoccupied. In the words of the biologist Tim Flannery, "ever since the extinction of the megafauna 13,000 years ago, the continent has had a seriously unbalanced fauna". This means, for example, that the managers of national parks in North America have to resort to culling to keep the population of ungulates under control.

Paul S. Martin (originator of the Pleistocene overkill hypothesis) states that present ecological communities in North America do not function appropriately in the absence of megafauna, because much of the native flora and fauna evolved under the influence of large mammals.

=== Ecological and evolutionary implications ===
Research shows that species interactions play a pivotal role in conservation efforts. Communities where species evolved in response to Pleistocene megafauna (but now lack large mammals) may be in danger of collapse. Most living megafauna are threatened or endangered; extant megafauna have a significant impact on the communities they occupy, which supports the idea that communities evolved in response to large mammals. Pleistocene rewilding could "serve as additional refugia to help preserve that evolutionary potential" of megafauna. Reintroducing megafauna to North America could preserve current megafauna, while filling ecological niches that have been vacant since the Pleistocene.

=== Climate implications ===
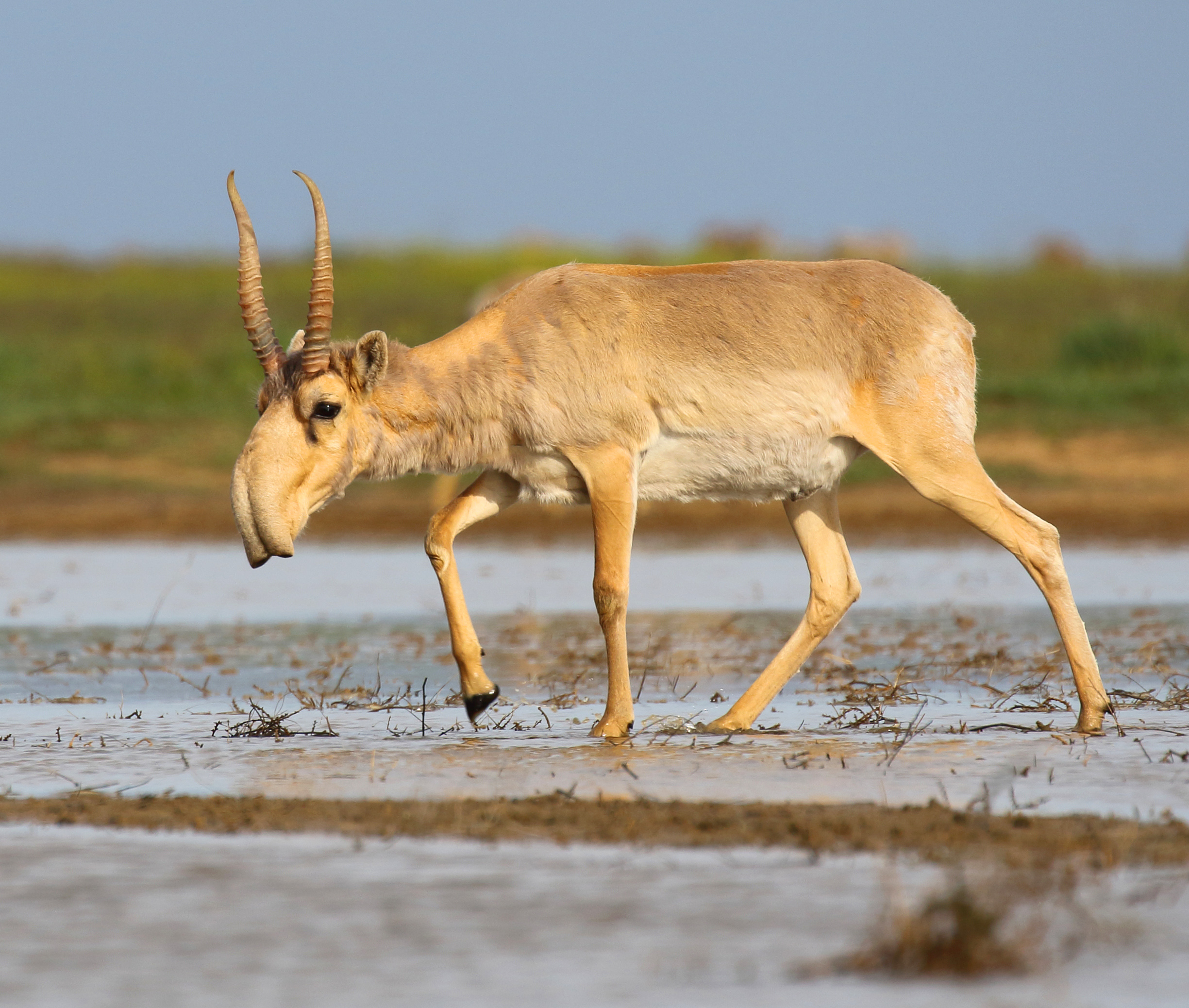
Saiga antelope are one of the animals proposed to be reintroduced in Pleistocene Park. Once ranging from Alaska to France, Saigas are now extinct in Europe and North America, and a near threatened species globally.

By restoring large herbivores, greenhouse gas levels may be lowered. Grazers may also reduce fire frequency by eating flammable brush, which would, in turn, lower greenhouse gas emissions, lower aerosol levels in the atmosphere, and alter the planet's albedo. Browsing and grazing also accelerates nutrient cycling, which may increase local plant productivity, and maintain ecosystem productivity specifically in grassy biomes. Megafauna also aid with carbon storage. The loss of megafauna that eat fruits may be responsible for up to a 10% reduction in carbon storage in tropical forests.

Sergey Zimov, a Russian scientist and proponent of Pleistocene rewilding, argues that it could restore the mammoth steppe ecosystem and thus slow the melting of the Arctic permafrost and give the world more time to respond to climate change. He holds that the mammoth steppe collapsed because of overhunting by humans rather than natural climate change, and has established Pleistocene Park in Siberia and Wild Field in European Russia to test grassland restoration through reintroducing mammoth steppe animals and proxies for them.

Yakutian horses, reindeer, European bison, plains bison, Domestic yak, moose, and Bactrian camels were reintroduced, and reintroduction is also planned for saigas, wood bison, and Siberian tigers. This project remains controversial — a letter published in Conservation Biology accused the Pleistocene camp of promoting "Frankenstein ecosystems", stating that 'the biggest problem is not the possibility of failing to restore lost interactions, but rather the risk of getting new, unwanted interactions instead.'

=== Extinct species with domestic descendants and relatives ===
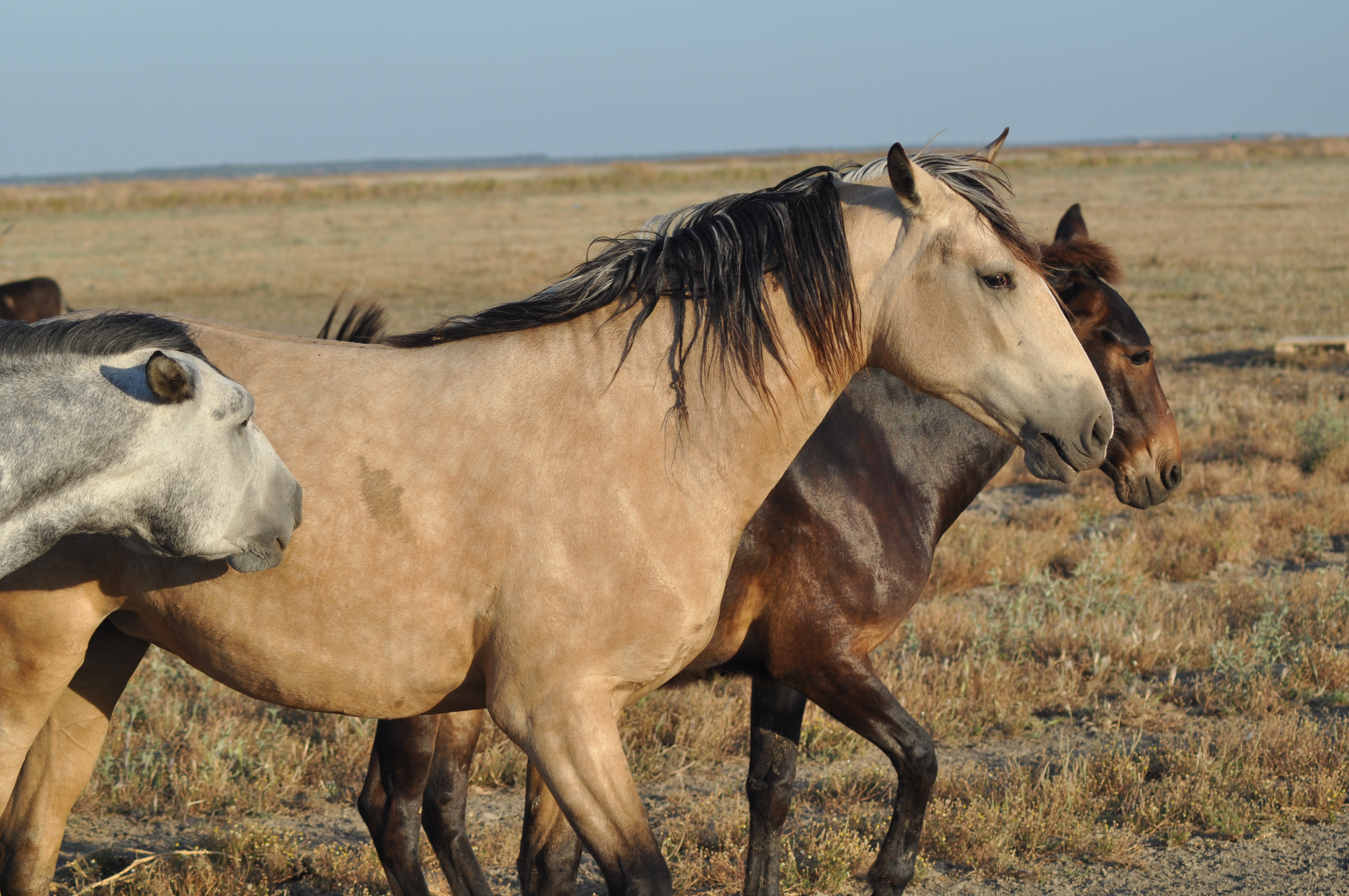
Wild horses in the Tagus International Natural Park

A number of primitive horse races (Note: Including Konik, Heck horse, Dülmener, Norwegian Fjord Horse, Exmoor pony, Pottoka, Losino horse, Sorraia, and Marismeño.) have been used as a proxy for the tarpan. Przewalski horse, a subspecies native of Mongolia and the only remaining wild horse in the world, has also been introduced in Ukraine, Hungary and France.

Robust cattle breeds or a combination of them as a proxy for the extinct aurochs. The Dutch-based TaurOs Project aims to reconstitute the aurochs by crossbreeding selected breeds, (Note: Sayaguesa, Maremmana primitivo, Pajuna, Limia, Maronesa, Podolica, Tudanca and Highland cattle.) while Heck cattle and Galloway cattle have already been used in grazing projects.

Extant wild camelidae contain only three species, the Guanaco, the Vicuna, and the Wild Bactrian camel. However both New World and Old World had a diversity of camelids until the Late-Pleistocene and the early Holocene. (Note: Such as wild ancestors of the domestic Bactrian camel and the Dromedary respectively (possibly Camelus thomasi for the latter), along with Camelops, Camelus antiquus, Camelus knoblochi, Camelus grattardi, Camelus sivalensis, Eulamaops, Hemiauchenia, Merycotherium, Palaeolama, and Syrian camel (Camelus concordiae and Camelus moreli).) Along with the extant wild species, domesticated members especially the Dromedary and the Bactrian camel may serve as proxies to replace their extinct ancestors and relatives among their natural ranges, including North and Central America, Siberia, from East Asia to Europe, Indian subcontinent, Middle East, and Northern Africa.

=== Introduced species as alternative proxy for extinct fauna ===
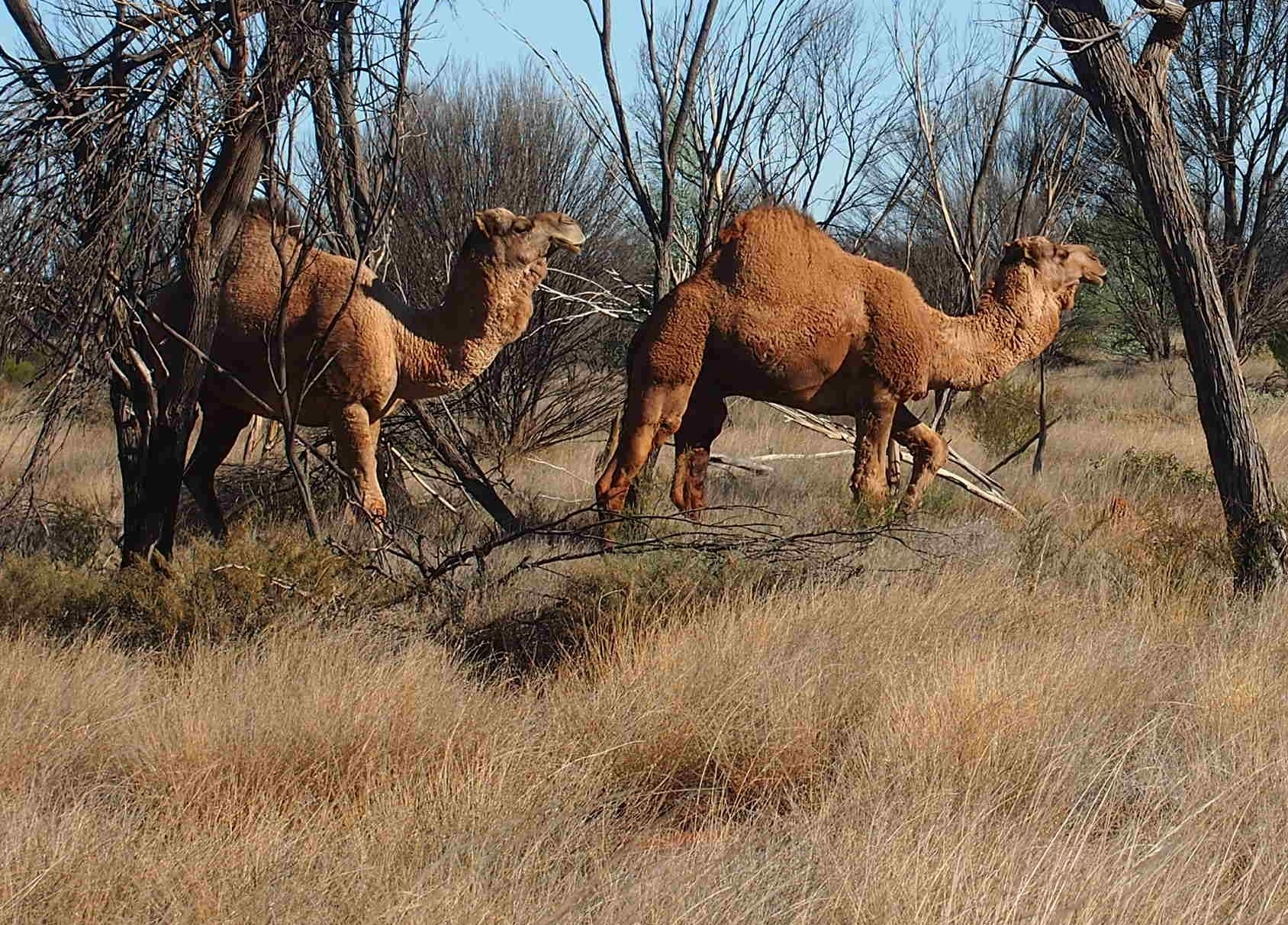
Feral camels roaming in the Australian outback.

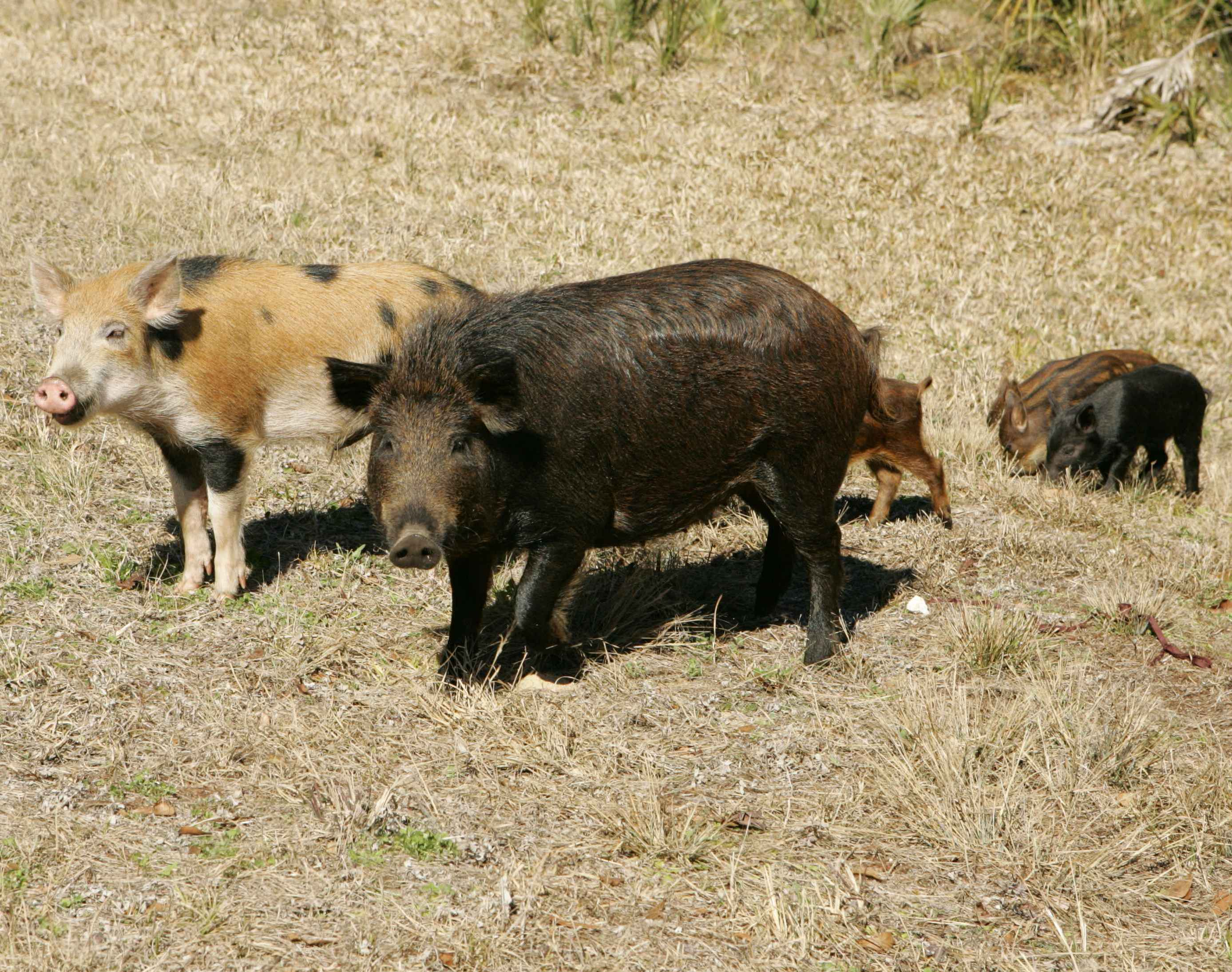
A family of feral pigs in the United States.

There have been discussions that introduced exotic faunas may fill empty niches of extinct faunas (at least partially) and constrain other introduced species, and some species, in particular ones facing threats in their native ranges, are more thriving in their exotic habitats. Therefore some experts promote reevaluation of their biological roles, so as their protections. However, an argument against the introduction of these animals is that they are sometimes very distantly related to the extinct native fauna, and artificial introduction of them may potentially involve ecological risks.

In North America, treatments of mustangs and burros have been discussed for decades, and additional medium and large faunas may also serve to American and Canadian ecosystems for certain extents. Such animals include feral cattles, feral pigs, feral goats, Barbary sheep, Himalayan tahrs, oryxes, nilgai and other antelopes, deer, and so on.

In Australia, a continent which had lost most of native megafauna, variety of exotic faunas most notably the Dromedary camel (as a proxy for Diprotodon and Palorchestes) may potentially compensate for missing niches, although they are very distant from the marsupials. There is an experimental yet controversial management of feral donkeys in Western Australia which may be counted as a form or megafaunal rewilding.

The same can be said for Central and South Americas, that have also lost most of its native megafaunas and instead hosts introduced ones, while feral horses may serve as a direct proxy for Hippidion.

In contrast, the "moa vs. deer" concept for New Zealand has been a topic of discussions and is more challengeable as the country naturally lacked terrestrial mammalian megafaunas.

== Criticism ==
The main criticism of the Pleistocene rewilding is that it is unrealistic to assume that communities today are functionally similar to their state 10,000 years ago. Opponents argue that there has been more than enough time for communities to evolve in the absence of megafauna, and thus the reintroduction of large mammals could thwart ecosystem dynamics and possibly cause collapse. Under this argument, the prospective taxa for reintroduction are considered exotic and could potentially harm natives of North America through invasion, disease, or other factors.

Opponents of Pleistocene rewilding present an alternative conservation program, in which more recent North American natives will be reintroduced into parts of their native ranges where they became extinct during historical times. Another method of Pleistocene rewilding is by using de-extinction, bringing extinct species back to life through cloning.

== Pleistocene rewilding on continents ==
=== Europe ===
This plan was considered by Josh Donlan and Jens-C. Svenning, and involves (as in rewilding North America) creating a Pleistocene habitat in portions of Europe. Svenning claims that "Pleistocene Rewilding can be taken for consideration outside of North America". Incidentally, an independent "Rewilding Europe" initiative was established in the Netherlands in 2011, with the western Iberian Peninsula, Velebit, the Danube delta and the eastern and southern Carpathians as particular targets.

The proxies which may be used for this project(s) are:

Animals already introduced

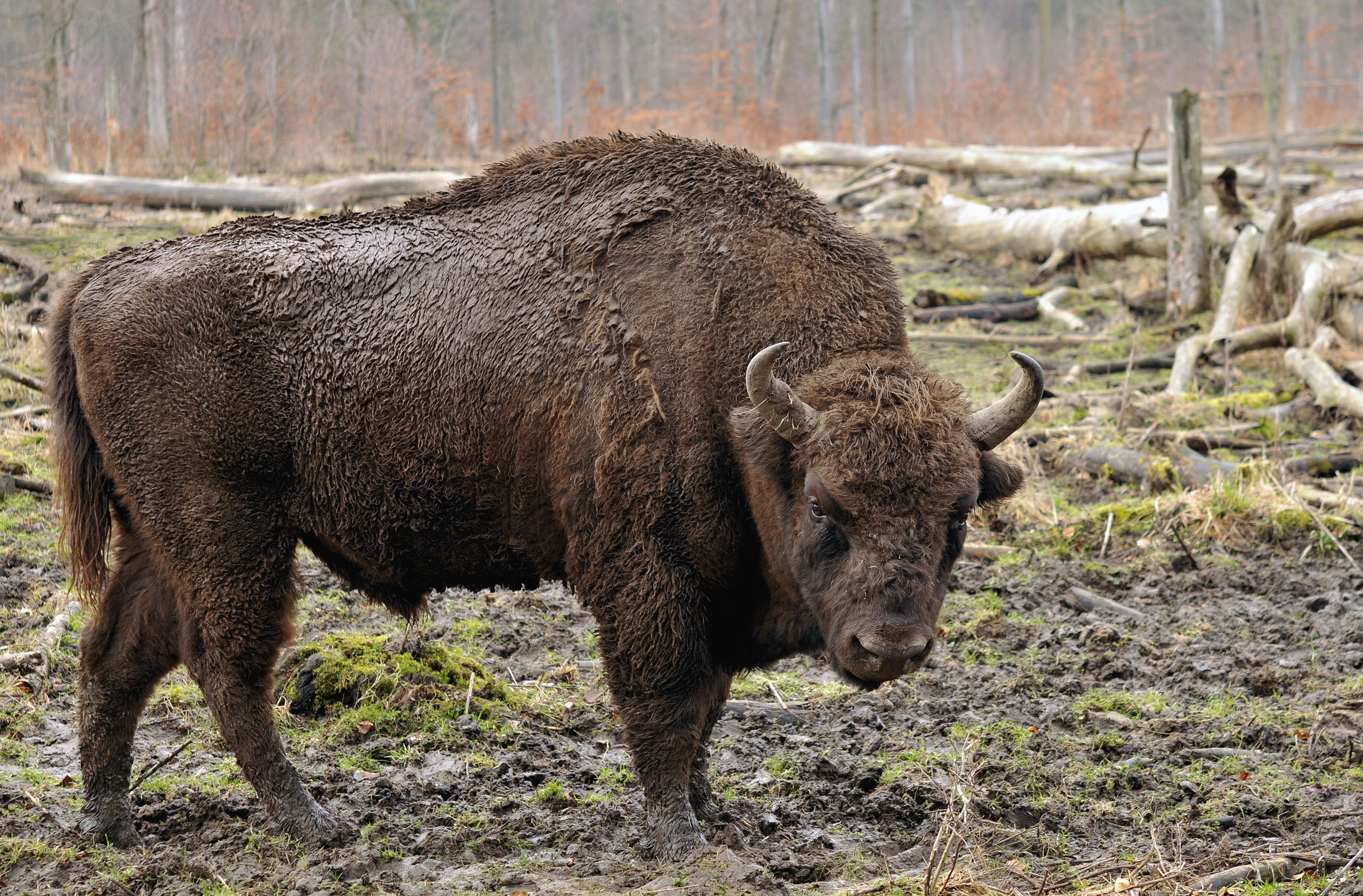
European Bison

- Barbary macaque, reintroduced to Gibraltar from present-day Morocco during the Middle Ages. In the Pleistocene, it inhabited the warmer Mediterranean regions of Europe, from the Balearic Islands and mainland Iberia and France in the west, east to Italy, Sicily, Malta, and as far north as Germany and Norfolk in the British Isles.
- Fallow deer, reintroduced from Anatolia in most parts of Europe already in Ancient times.
- Mouflon, reintroduced for hunting purposes in the continent from the island populations of Corsica and Sardinia (originated in turn by introductions from the Middle East during the Neolithic period).
- Musk ox, reintroduced in 1976 to Russia (Taimyr Peninsula and Wrangel Island) and Scandinavia.
- European bison, saved from extinction in zoos in the early 20th century and reintroduced in several places of Eastern Europe.
- Northern bald ibis, extinct in southern Europe during the Modern Age, has reintroduction projects underway in Austria and Spain.
- Water buffalo, reintroduced in several areas including Danube Delta (present in the Danube basin in the early Holocene period and a proxy for the similar Bubalus murrensis which was widespread in southern Europe during the warmer periods of the Pleistocene; domestic populations exist in Italy and the Balkans).
- Alpine marmot, reintroduced with success in the Pyrenees in 1948, where it had disappeared at end of the Pleistocene epoch.

Species still extant outside Europe

- Asian black bear (Until the late Pleistocene, Europe had two subspecies of its own, Ursus thibetanus mediterraneus in western Europe and the Caucasus as well as Ursus thibetanus permjak in eastern Europe, especially the Ural mountains)
- Asian elephant (Proxy for the extinct Straight-tusked elephant, also historically present in Turkey. The Randers Tropical Zoo in Denmark plans on using Asian elephants on a small scale local rewilding project)
- Dhole (Occurred during Late-Glacial Period)
- Hippopotamus (Occurred in Europe during the Pleistocene; suitable in warmer parts of Europe)
- Northern lion (Widespread in Europe during the Pleistocene. In historical times in southeastern Europe, ranging as far as Hungary. Can also serve as a proxy for the extinct European cave lion.)
- Onager (also recently extinct in Eastern Europe)
- Persian leopard (Leopards thrived in Europe until the end of the Pleistocene and are still present in the Caucasus.)
- Saiga antelope (present in Eastern Europe until recently)
- Spotted hyena (Last occurrence during the Late-Glacial Period)
- Sumatran rhinoceros (The closest living relative of European rhinoceros lineages. If saved from extinction, this species could possibly replace the extinct Merck's rhinoceros, but if Sumatran rhinos go extinct, the White rhinoceros could be used instead to replace Merck's rhinoceros)

=== Northern Siberia ===
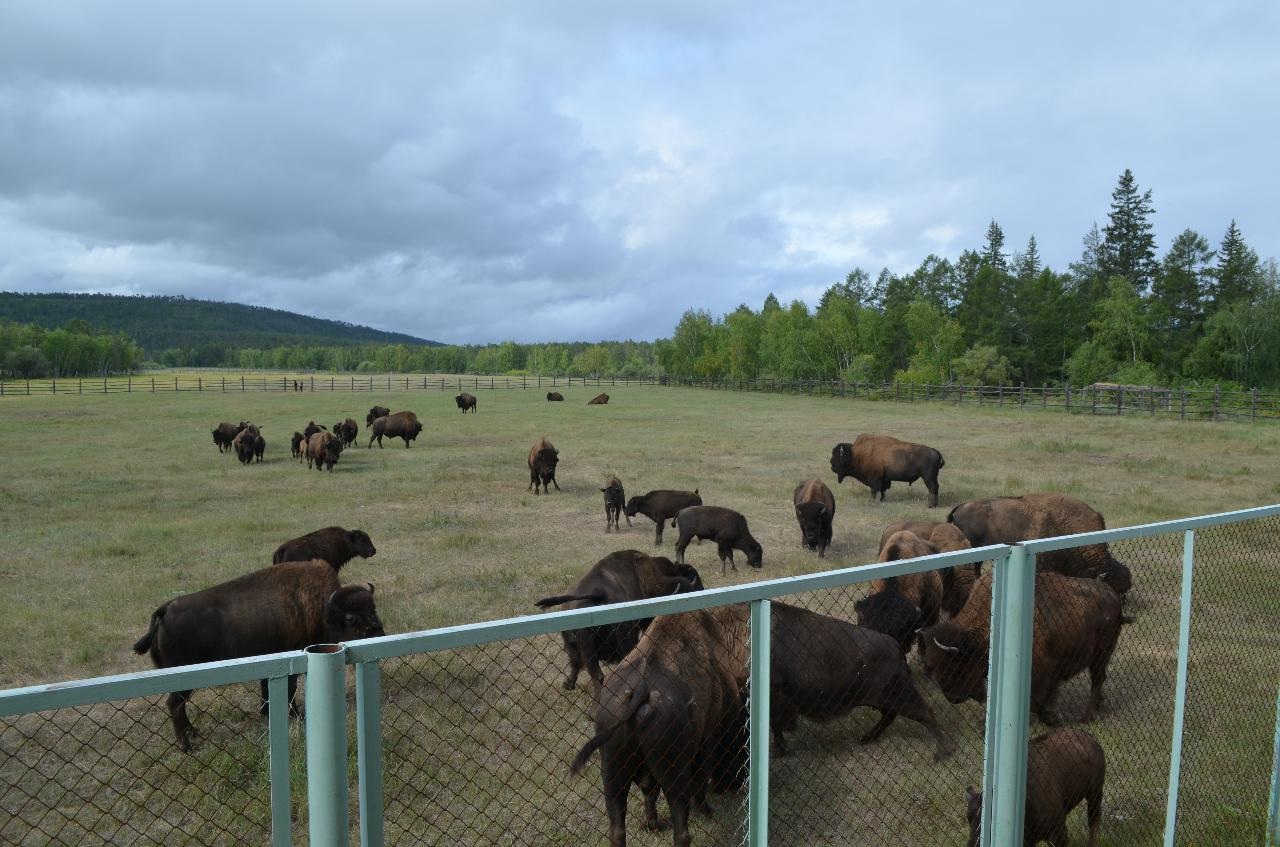
Wood bison reintroduction program in the Sakha Republic.

The aim of Siberian Pleistocene rewilding is to recreate the ancient mammoth steppe by reintroducing megafauna. The first step was the successful reintroduction of musk oxen on the Taymyr Peninsula and Wrangel island. In 1988, researcher Sergey Zimov created Pleistocene Park – a nature reserve in northeastern Siberia for full-scale megafauna rewilding. Reindeer, Siberian roe deer and moose were already present; Yakutian horses, muskox, Altai wapiti and wisent were reintroduced. Reintroduction is also planned for yak, Bactrian camels, snow sheep, Saiga antelope, and Siberian tigers.

The wood bison, the closest relative of the ancient bison which became extinct in Siberia 1,000 to 2,000 years ago, is an important species for the ecology of Siberia. In 2006, 30 bison calves were flown from Edmonton, Alberta to Yakutsk. Now they live in the government-run Ust'-Buotama reserve.

Animals already introduced

- Bactrian camel
- Domestic Yak Six domestic yak were brought to Pleistocene Park in 2017. It turned out that two of the Yaks were pregnant so now there are eight Yak in Pleistocene Park.
- Musk ox (became extinct in Siberia about 2000 years ago, but has been reintroduced in Taimyr Peninsula and on Wrangel Island)
- Wood bison (As a proxy for the extinct Steppe bison)
- Yakutian horse (A group of these horses were brought to Pleistocene Park to replace the extinct horses)

Considered for reintroduction

- Saiga antelope (occurred in many parts of Siberia until recently, now restricted to Chyornye Zemli Nature Reserve)
- Siberian roe deer (could be brought back by both introductions and migrations)
- Siberian tiger (occurred up to Beringia during the late Pleistocene, now restricted to southeastern Siberia)
- Snow sheep (could be brought back to many parts of Siberia through both introductions and migrations)

=== Asia ===
Animals already introduced

- Southern white rhinoceroses in China (see also Rhinoceroses in ancient China#History)

Considered for reintroduction

- California sea lion (as a proxy for Japanese sea lion)

=== North America ===
A controversial 2005 editorial in Nature, signed by a number of conservation biologists, took up the argument, urging that elephants, lions, and cheetahs could be reintroduced in protected areas in the Great Plains. The Bolson tortoise, discovered in 1959 in Durango, Mexico, was the first species proposed for this restoration effort, and in 2006 the species was reintroduced to two ranches in New Mexico owned by media mogul Ted Turner. Other proposed species include various camelids such as the Wild Bactrian camel, and various equids such as the Prezwalski's horse.

As aforementioned, there is room for discussion to evaluate both merits and drawbacks of exotic fauna to local ecosystems, such as from feral pigs to oryxes and nilgai.

Possible candidates for reintroduction

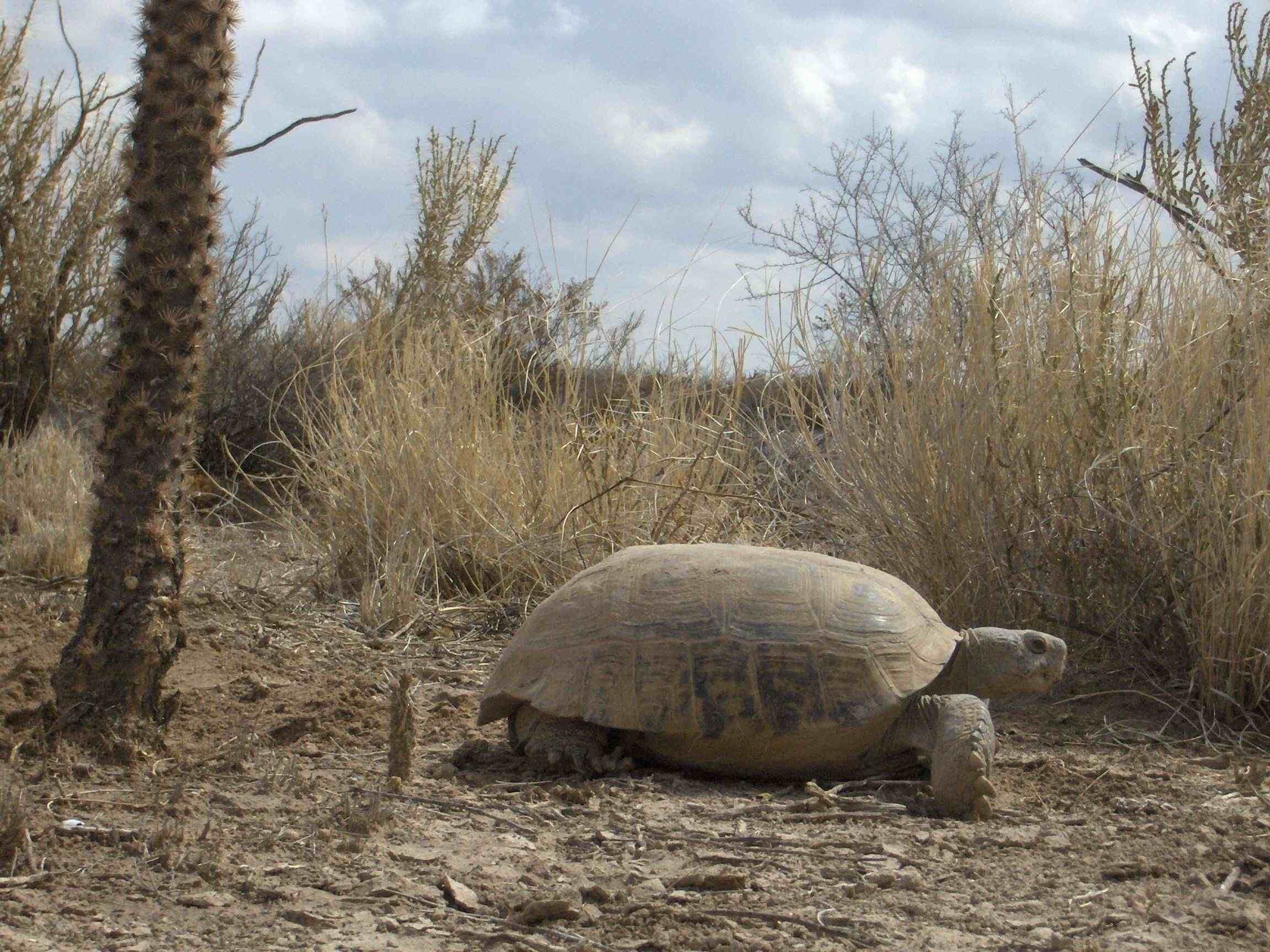
The Bolson tortoise, the first proposed candidate for Pleistocene rewilding in both North and South Americas.

Pleistocene rewilding aims at the promotion of extant fauna and the reintroduction of extinct genera in the southwestern and central United States. Native fauna are the first genera proposed for reintroduction. The Bolson tortoise was widespread during the Pleistocene epoch, and continued to be common during the Holocene epoch until recent times. Its reintroduction from northern Mexico would be a necessary step to recreate the soil humidity present in the Pleistocene, which would support grassland and extant shrub-land and provide the habitat required for the herbivores set for reintroduction. Other large tortoise species might later be introduced to fill the role of various species of Hesperotestudo. However, to be successful, ecologists must first support fauna already present in the region.

The plains bison and the wood bison numbered in the millions during the Pleistocene and most of the Holocene, until European settlers drove them to near-extinction in the late 19th century. The plains bison has made a recovery in many regions of its former range, and is involved in several local rewilding projects across the Midwestern United States.

The pronghorn, which is extant in most of the west after almost becoming extinct, is crucial to the revival of the ancient ecosystem. Pronghorns are native to the region, which once supported large numbers of the species and extinct relatives of the same family. It would occupy the Great Plains and other arid regions of the west and southwest.

Distributions of some of today's arctic species and their relatives were much broader during the late Pleistocene and the Holocene; reindeer reached as far as southern United States, and close relatives of muskox (Note: Bootherium, Euceratherium, Praeovibos, and Speleotherium.) extended to southern United States and Mexico, and extant reindeer and muskox might be able to inhabit southern Canada and northern portions of the Lower 48 states.

Bighorn sheep and mountain goat are already present in the surrounding mountainous areas and therefore should not pose a problem in rewilding more mountainous areas. Mountain goats are already being introduced to areas formerly occupied by Oreamnos haringtoni, a more southern relative that went extinct at the end of the Pleistocene. Reintroducing extant species of deer to the more forested areas of the region would be beneficial for the ecosystems they occupy, providing rich nutrients for the forested regions and helping to maintain them. These species include elk, white-tailed and mule deer.

Omnivorous species considered beneficial for the regional ecosystems include the collared peccary, a species of pig-like ungulate that was abundant in the Pleistocene. Although this species (along with the flat-headed and long-nosed peccaries) is extinct in many regions of North America, their relatives survive in Central and South America and the collared peccary can still be found in southern Arizona, New Mexico, and Texas. The Chacoan peccary, or even feral pigs, that possess morphological similarities to the flat-headed peccary, might be able to replace it in areas of the Great Plains and the South.

Horses originated in North America and spread to Asia via the Ice Age land bridge, but became extinct in their evolutionary homeland alongside the mammoth and ground sloth. The Pleistocene grasslands of North America were the birthplace of the modern horse, and by extension the wild horse. North America already has feral populations of Mustang and Burro. Animals that would serve as predators of these equine species would include lions and wolves.

Alongside the wild horse, camels evolved in the drier regions of North America. Although camelids are extinct in North America, they have survived in South America until today: the guanaco and vicuña, and domesticated llama and alpaca. North America links the South American camelids with those of the Old World (the Dromedary, Bactrian camel and wild Bactrian camel). Pleistocene rewilding suggests that the closest relatives of the North American species of camelid be reintroduced. The candidates would be Old World camels as a proxy for Camelops, and New World camelids as a proxies for smaller species of both Hemiauchenia and Palaeolama. These species would live in the arid regions and grasslands of North America. Although small in numbers, there are feral or semi-feral camelids in North America such as Dromedary in Texas and its vicinity and llamas among Hoh Rainforest on the Olympic Peninsula. Free-ranging camels face predators typical of their regional distribution, which include wolves and lions. The main predator of guanacos and vicuñas is the cougar.

During the Pleistocene, a species of tapir (Tapirus californicus) existed in North America with many ecotypes. They became extinct at the end of the Pleistocene epoch, but their relatives survive in Asia and South America. The mountain tapir would be an excellent choice for rewilding humid areas, such as those near lakes and rivers. The mountain tapir is the only extant non-tropical species of tapir. Predators of mountain tapirs include cougars, bears, and, less commonly, jaguars. Good introduction areas might include forested ecosystems of the west and east coasts, and the more scrub-like or wetland ecosystem of the south.

During the Pleistocene, large populations of Proboscideans lived in North America, such as the Woolly, Columbian and Pygmy mammoths, and the American mastodon. The mastodons all became extinct at the end of the Pleistocene epoch, as did the mammoths of North America. However, an extant relative of the mammoth is the Asian elephant. It now resides only in tropical southeastern Asia, but the fossil record shows that it was much more widespread, living in temperate northern China as well as the Middle East (an area bearing an ecological similarity to the southern and central United States). The Asian elephant is possibly a good candidate for Pleistocene rewilding in North America. Asian elephants would do well in the environments previously occupied by the Columbian mammoth.

Several species of capybaras, such as Hydrochoerus hesperotiganites and Neochoerus aesopi and Neochoerus pinckneyi, were present in North America until the late Pleistocene. Today, feral population(s) of capybara inhabit Florida while breeding has not been confirmed yet. These feral animals potentially fill ecological niches of extinct capybaras.

Pleistocene America boasted a wide variety of carnivores (most of which are extinct today), such as the short-faced bear, saber-toothed cats (e.g. Homotherium and Smilodon), the American lion, dire wolf, and the American cheetah. Some carnivores and omnivores survived the end of the Pleistocene era and were widespread in North America until Europeans arrived, such as grizzly bears, cougars, jaguars, grey and red wolves, bobcats, and coyotes. Jaguars could be reintroduced back to areas of North America to control populations of prey animals. Genetic evidence suggests that the closest living relative of the American lion (Panthera atrox) is the modern lion (Panthera leo). Modern lion could act as a proxy for the Pleistocene American lion.

One predator that was once considered for introduction as an ecological equivalent to an extinct Pleistocene predator—but was ultimately ruled out—is the cheetah; this due to new scientific discoveries regarding the American cheetah (Miracinonyx sp.). Cassatt-Johnstone and colleagues proposed that the species was not exceptionally specialized like the modern cheetah for hunting cursorial prey such as pronghorns, but had a more flexible diet comparable to those of modern lions and cougars.

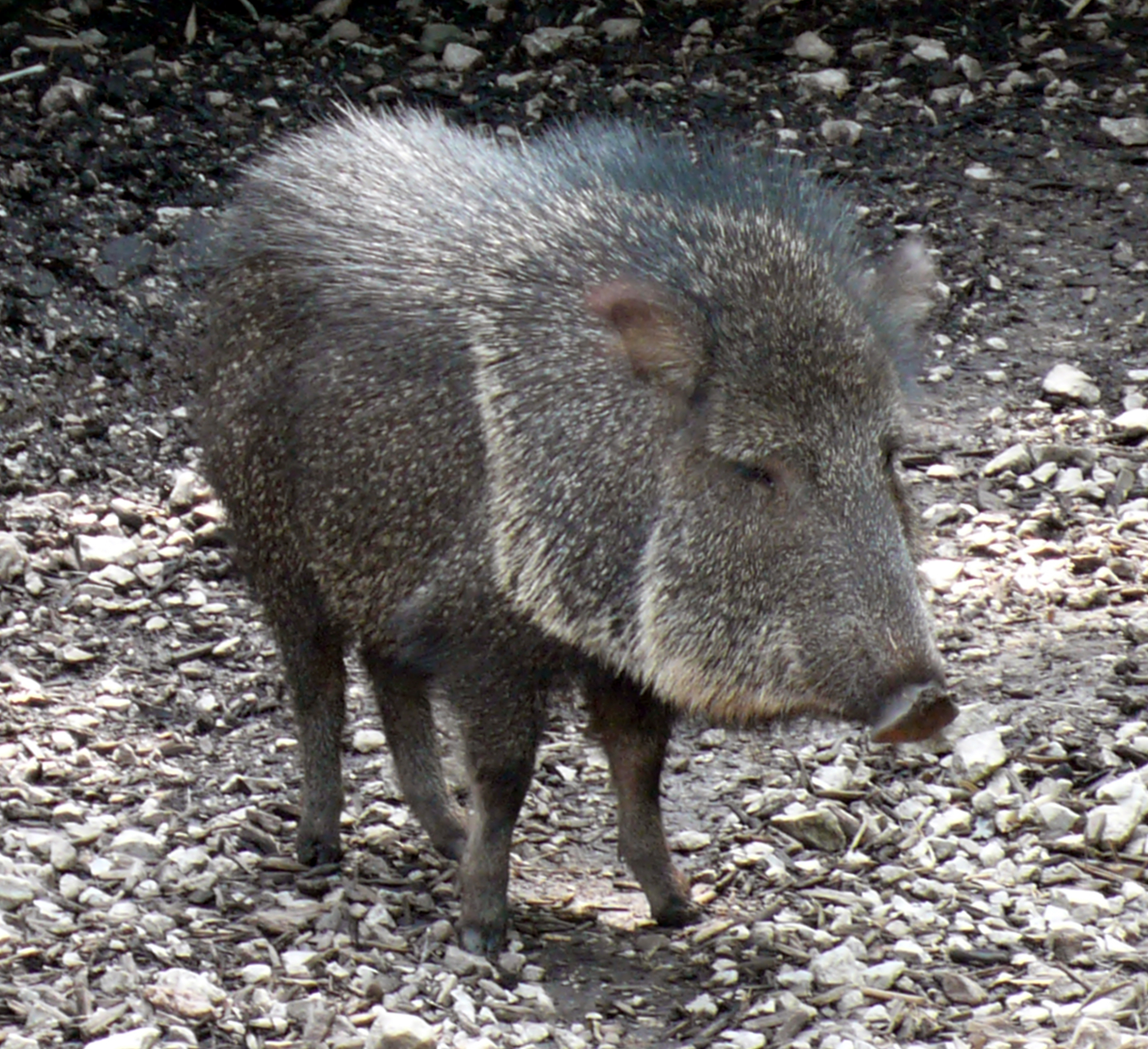
The Chacoan peccary

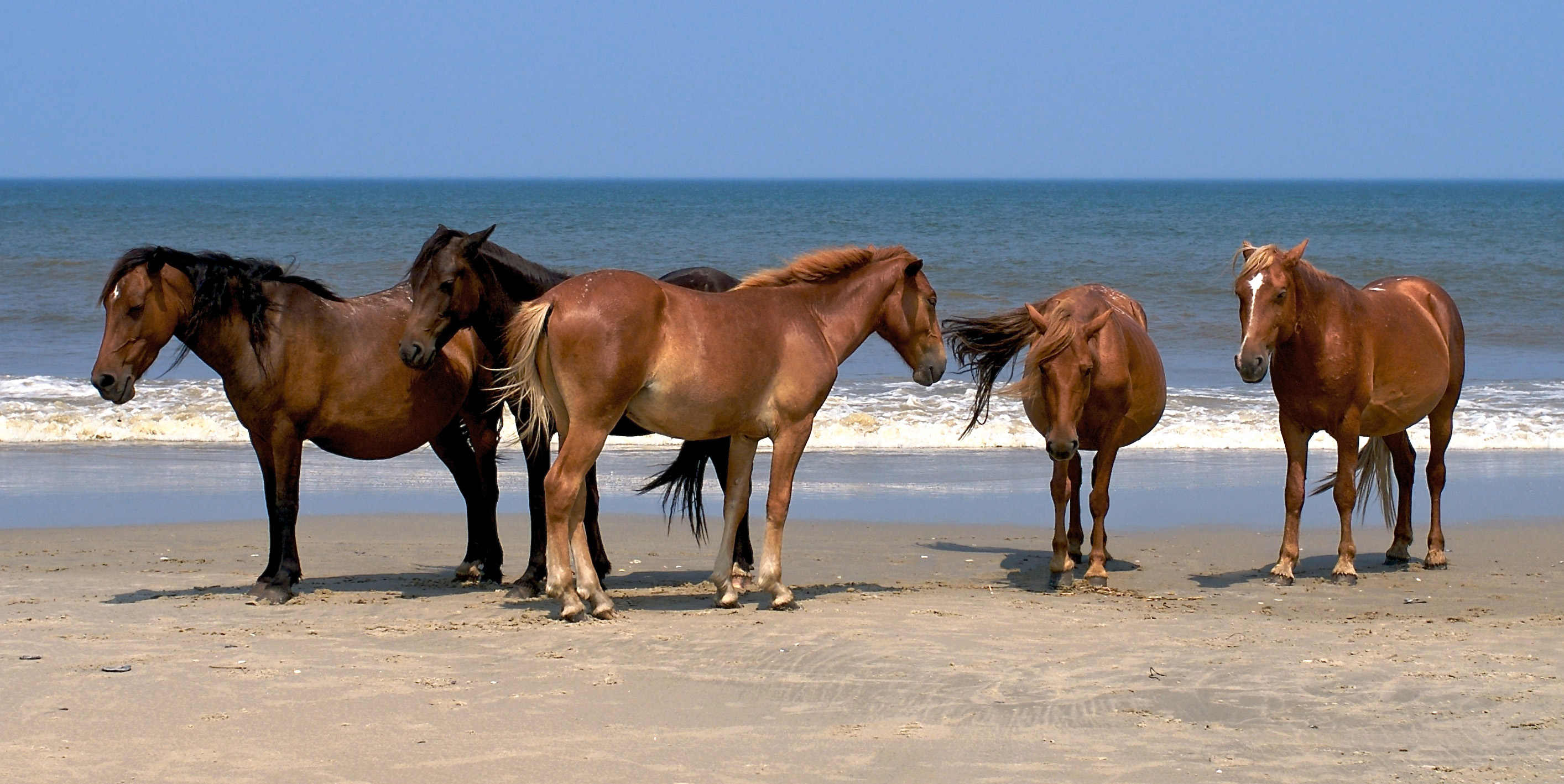
The Mustang

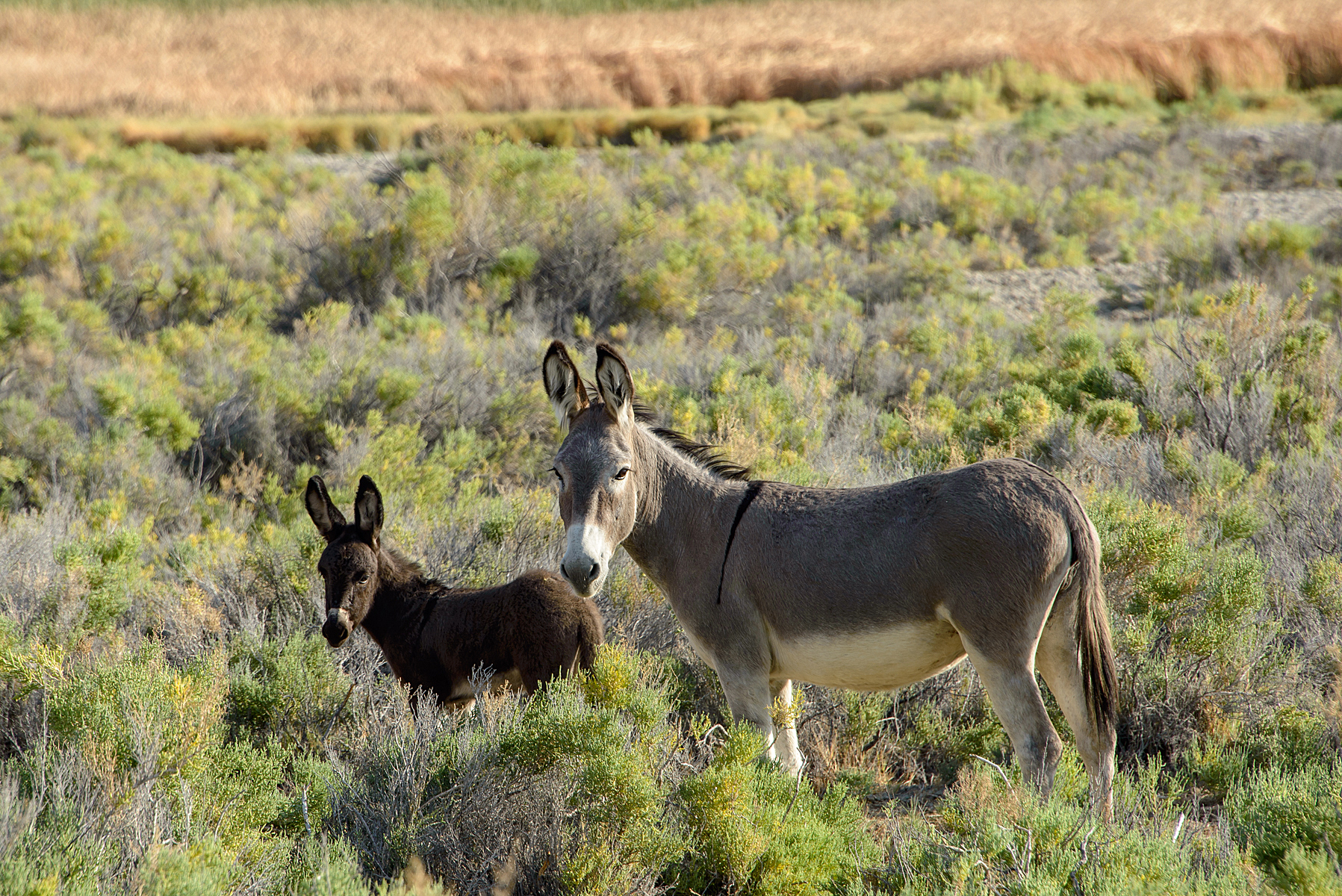
The Burro

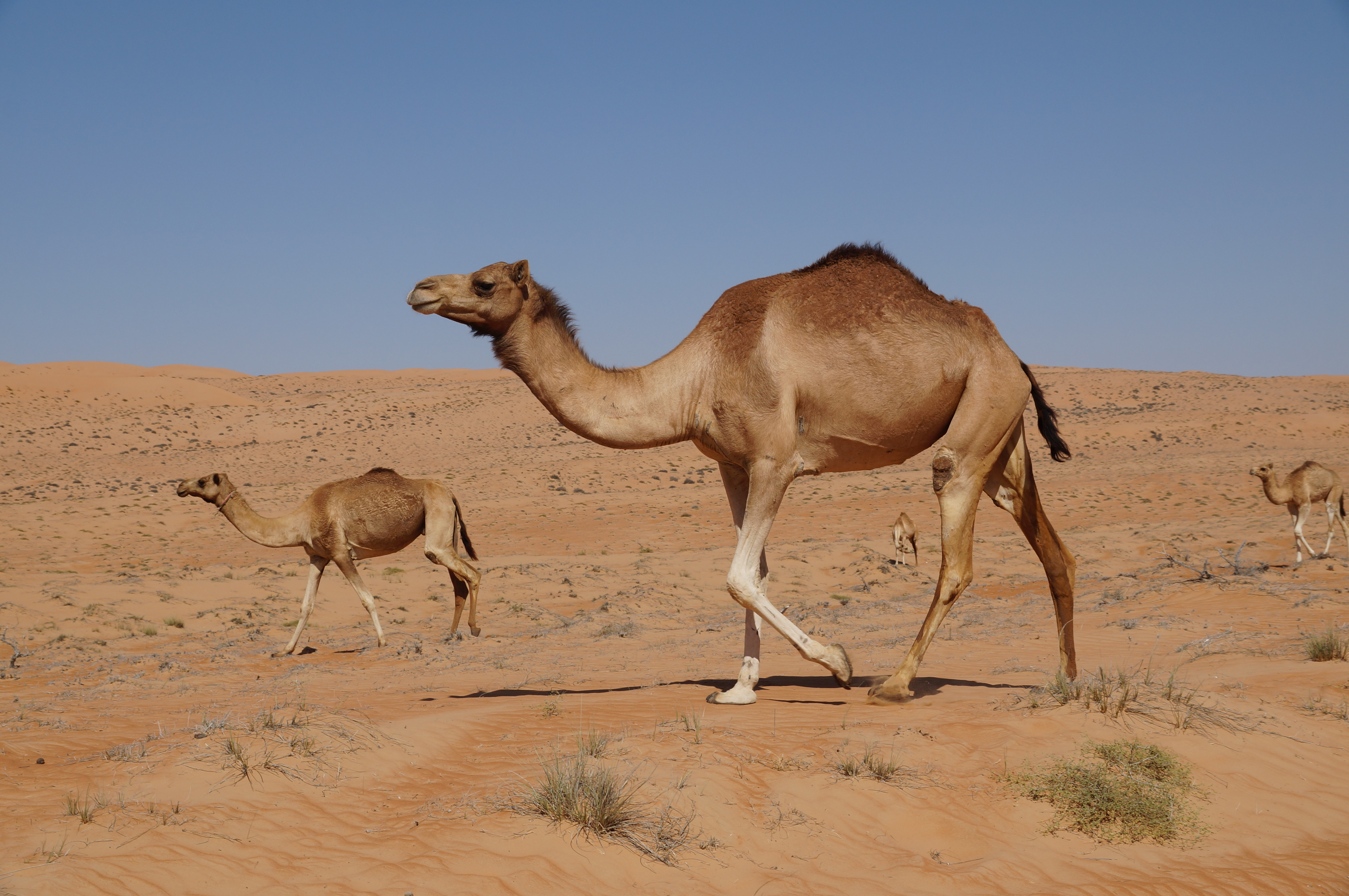
The Dromedary

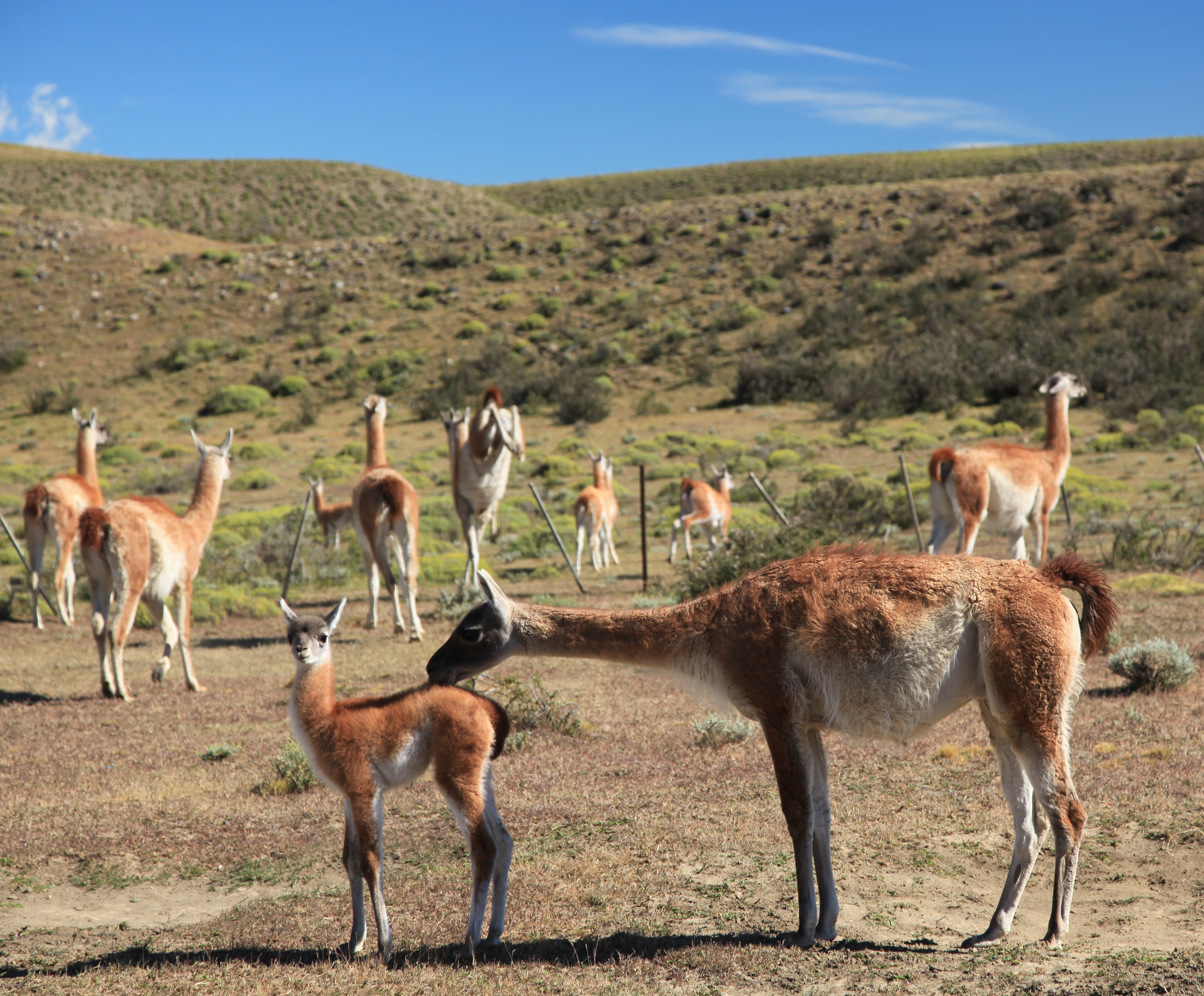
The Guanaco

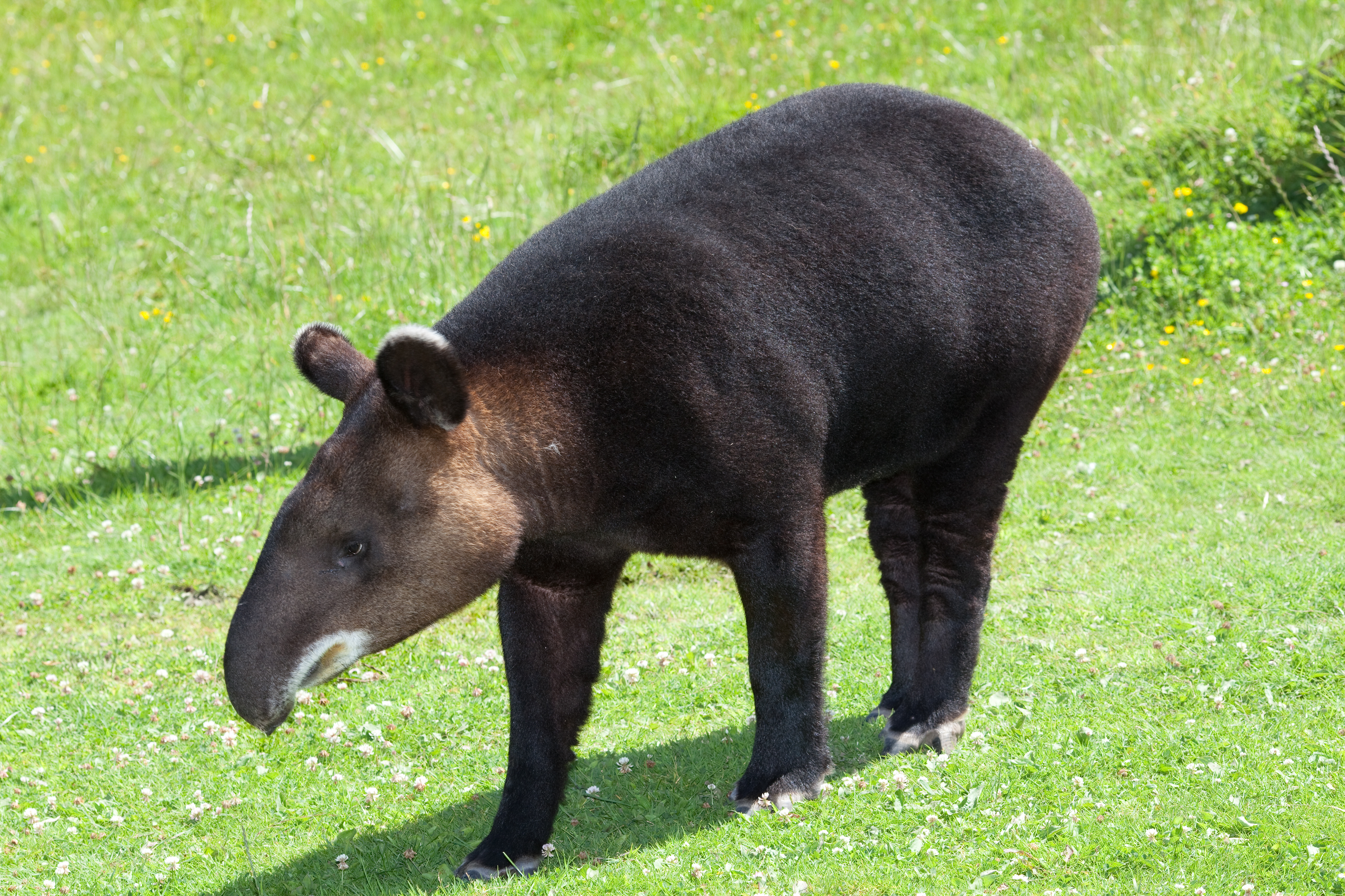
The mountain tapir

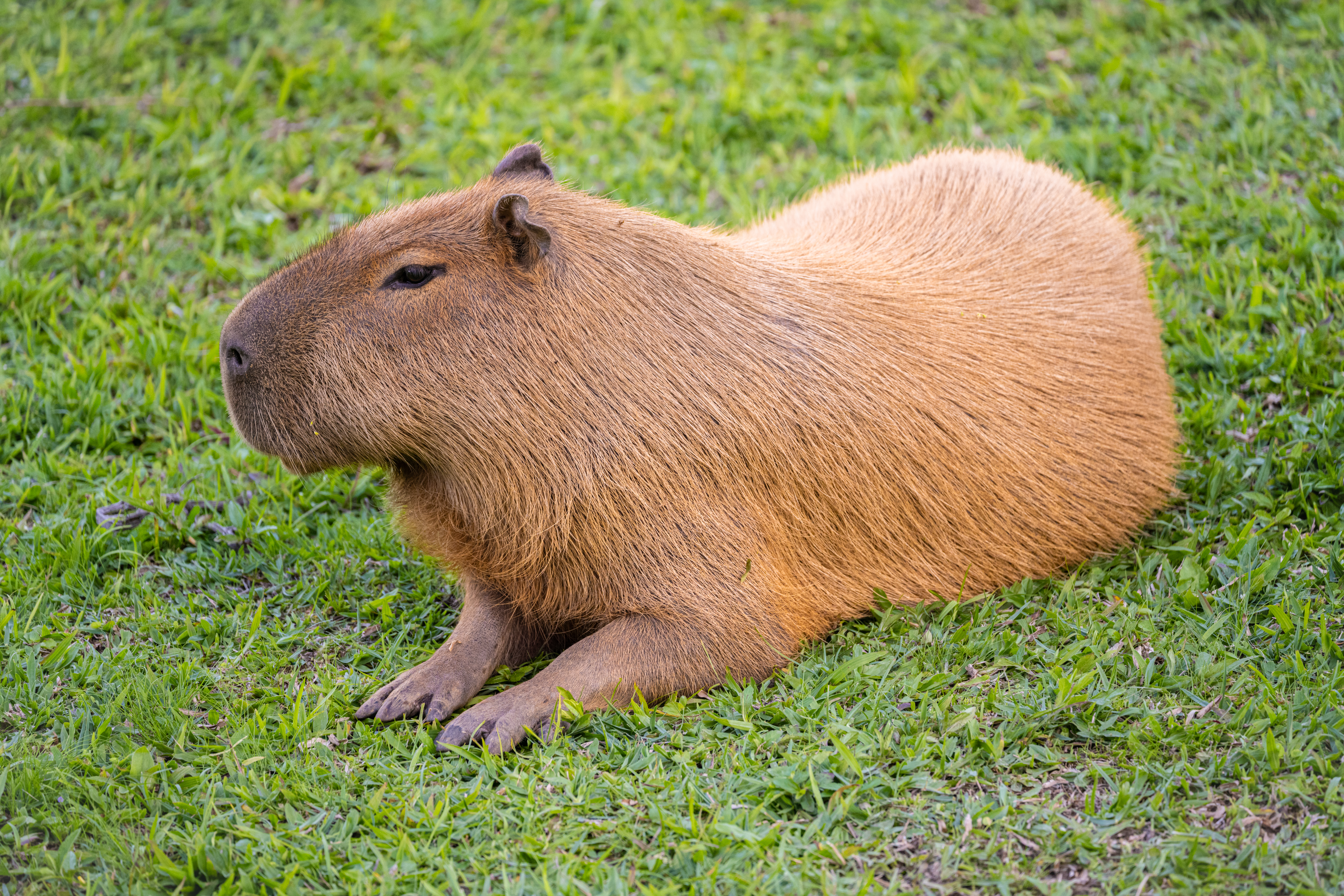
The capybara

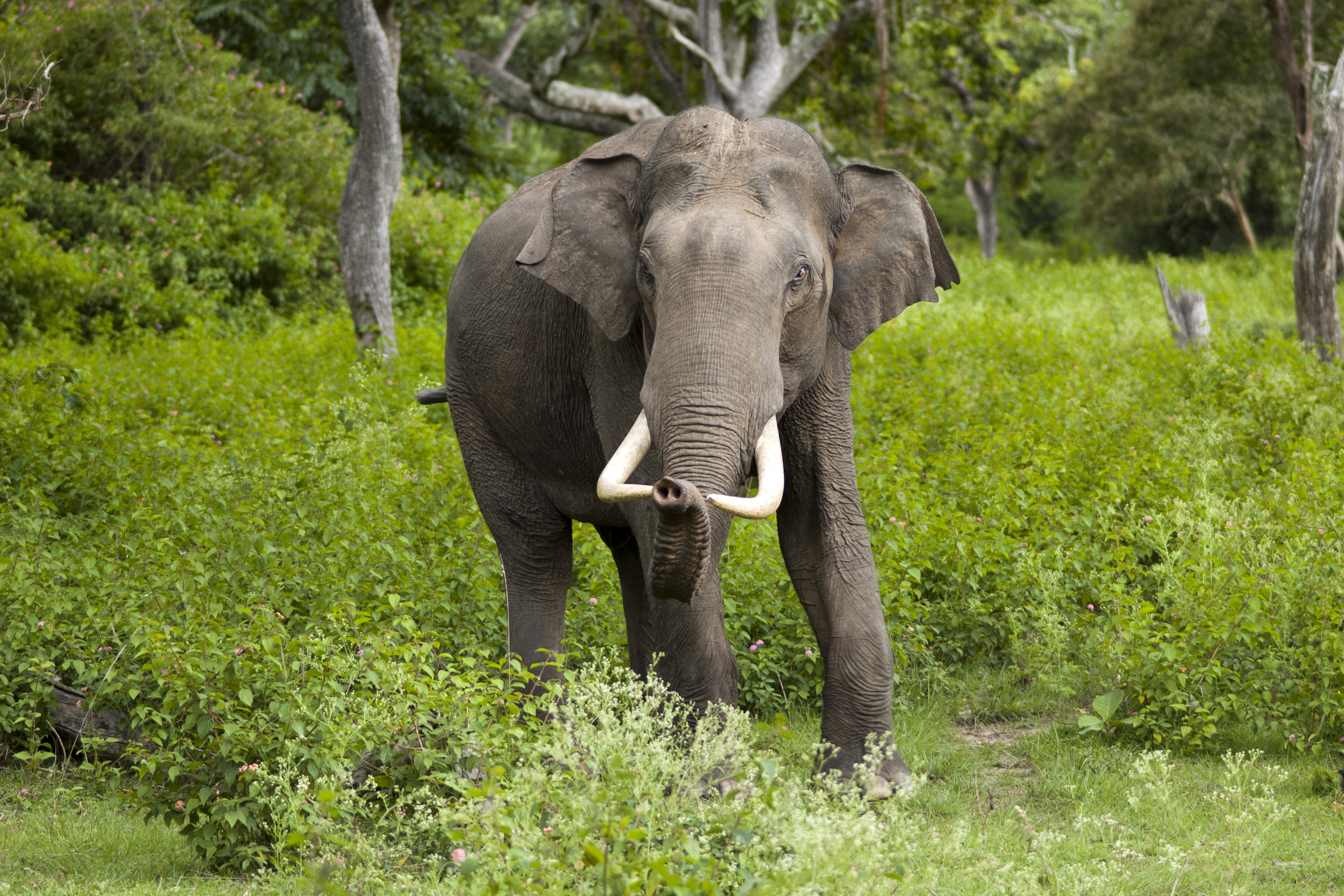
Asian elephant, the closest relative of the extinct mammoth.

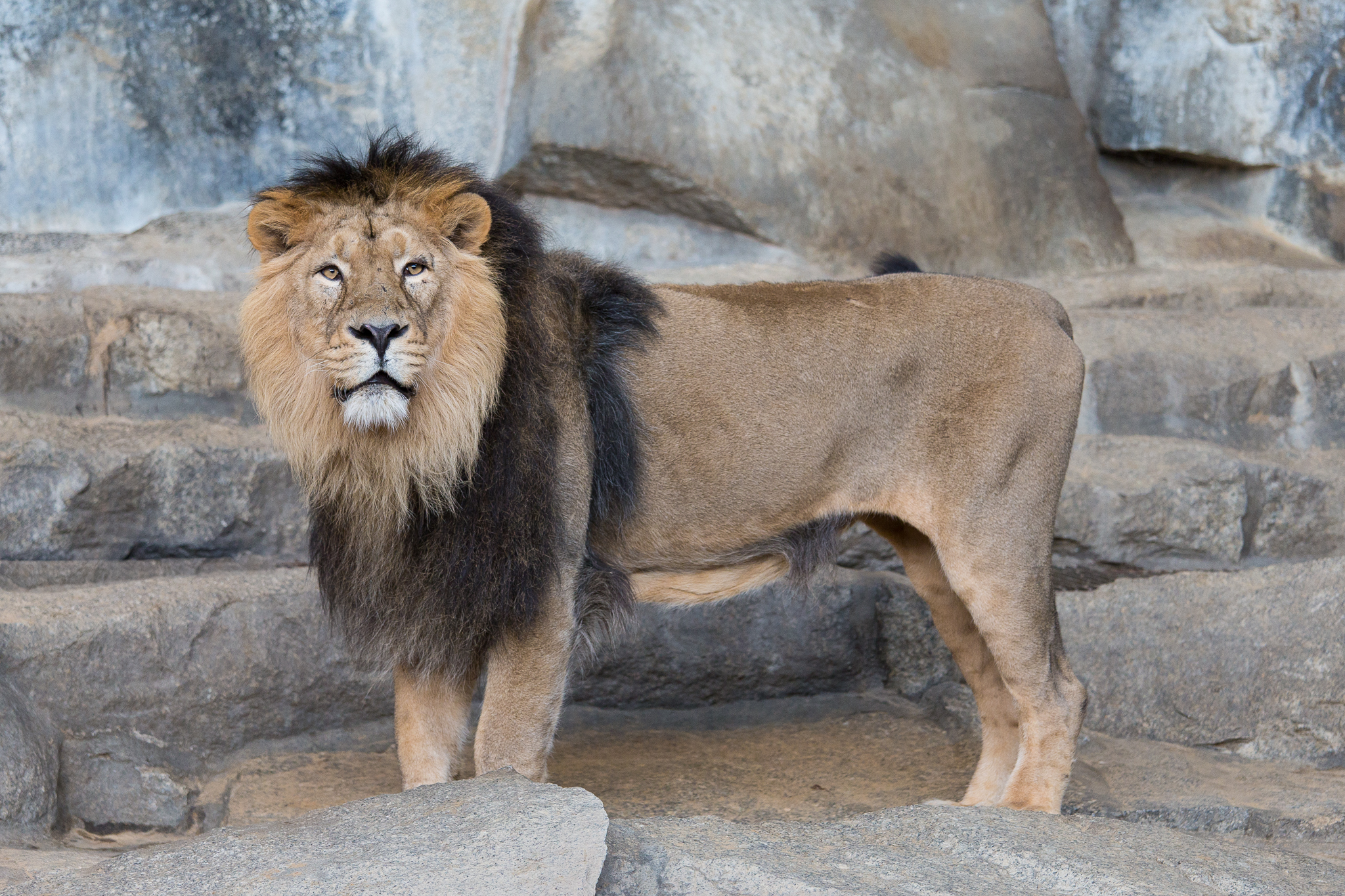
Modern lion, closest living relative of the American lion. In the picture an Asiatic lion.

Jaguar. In the United States it has been almost extinct since the beginning of the 20th century, but it still occurs in some areas of the country.

=== Central and South Americas ===
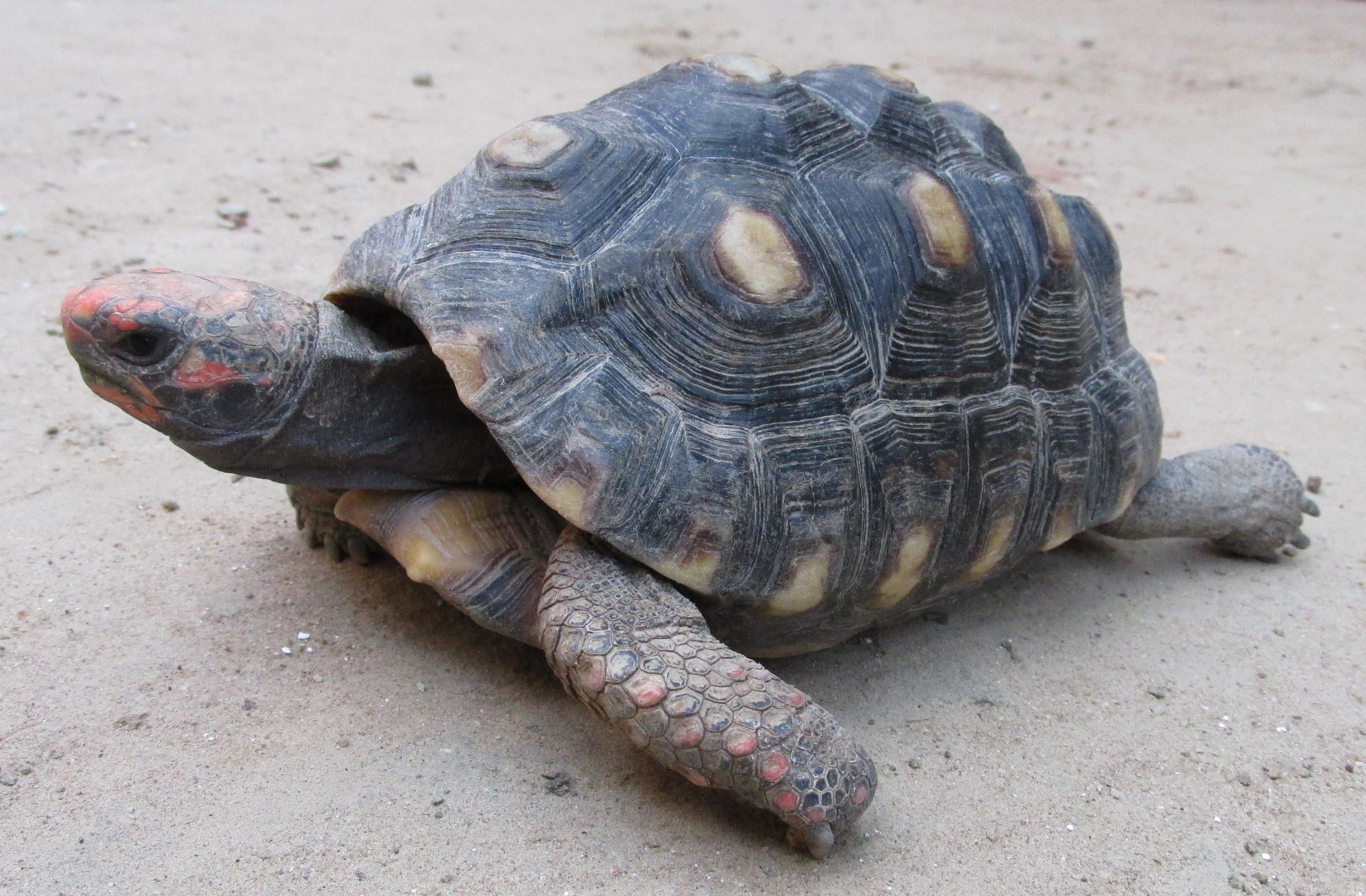
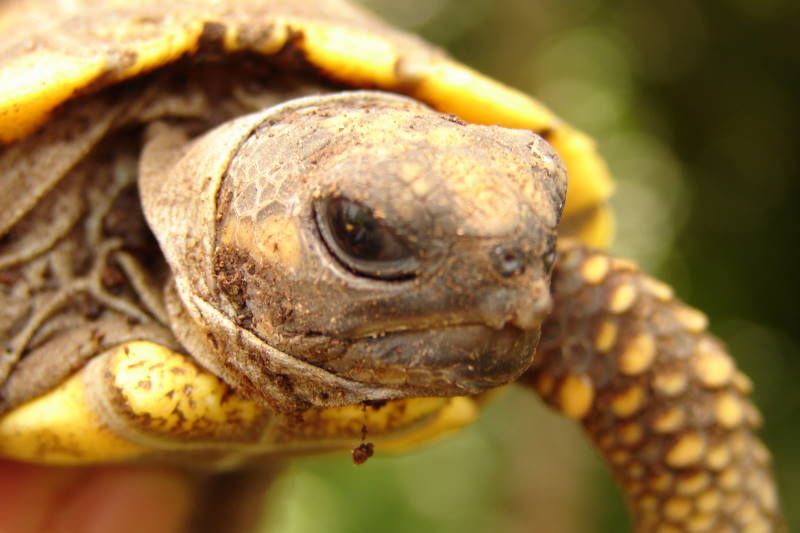
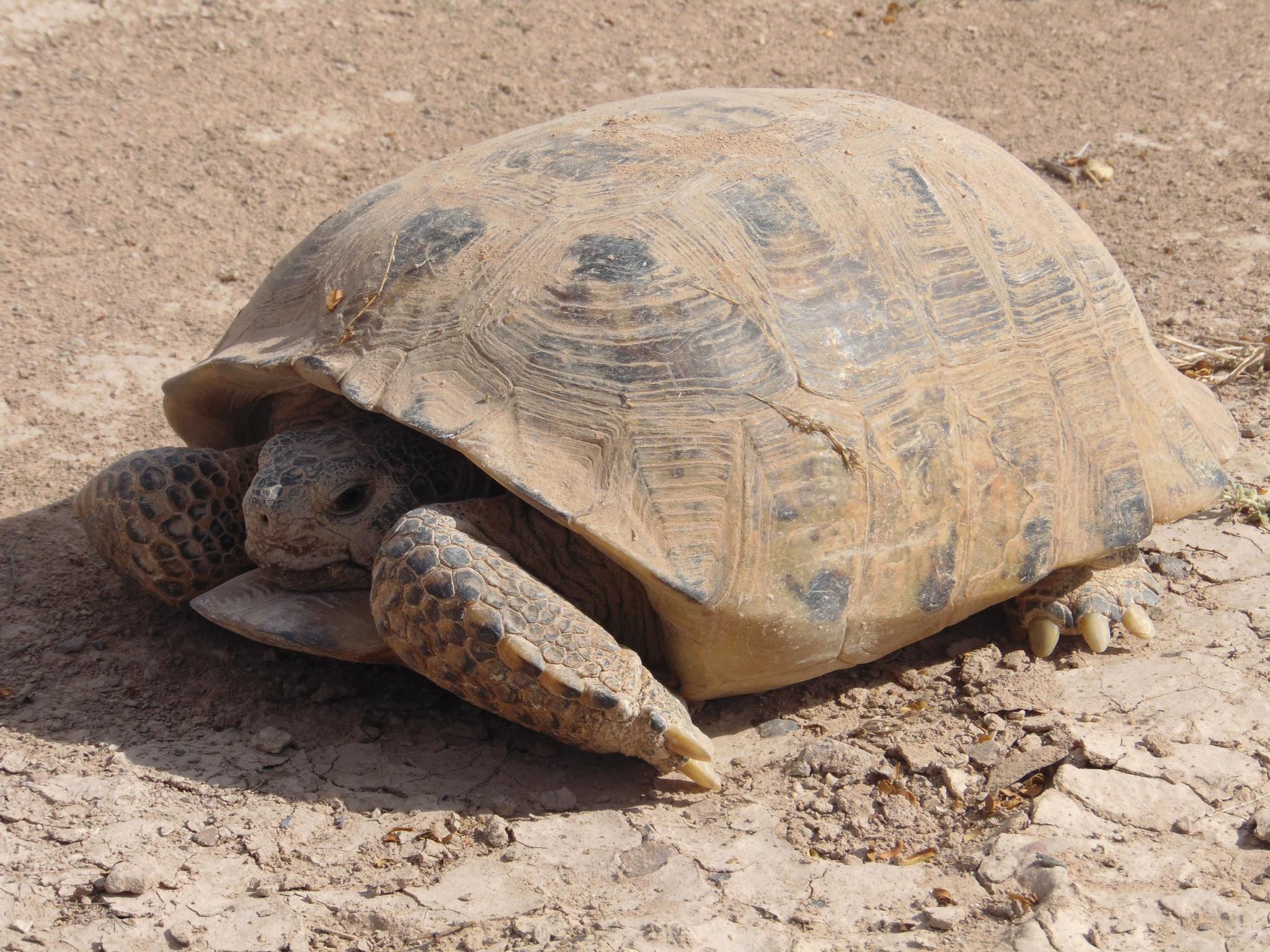
The red-footed, The yellow-footed, and the Bolson tortoises

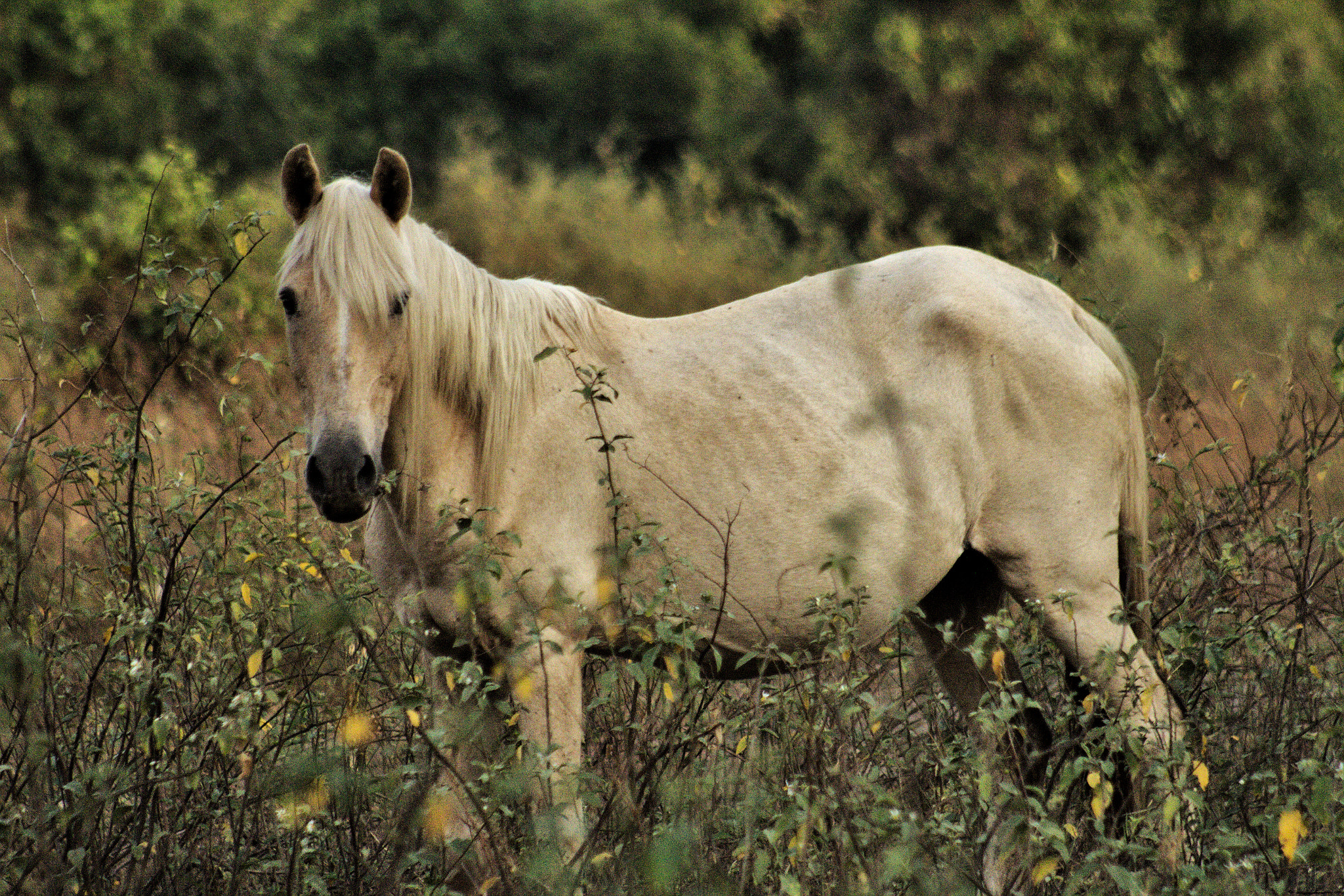
The Criollo horse

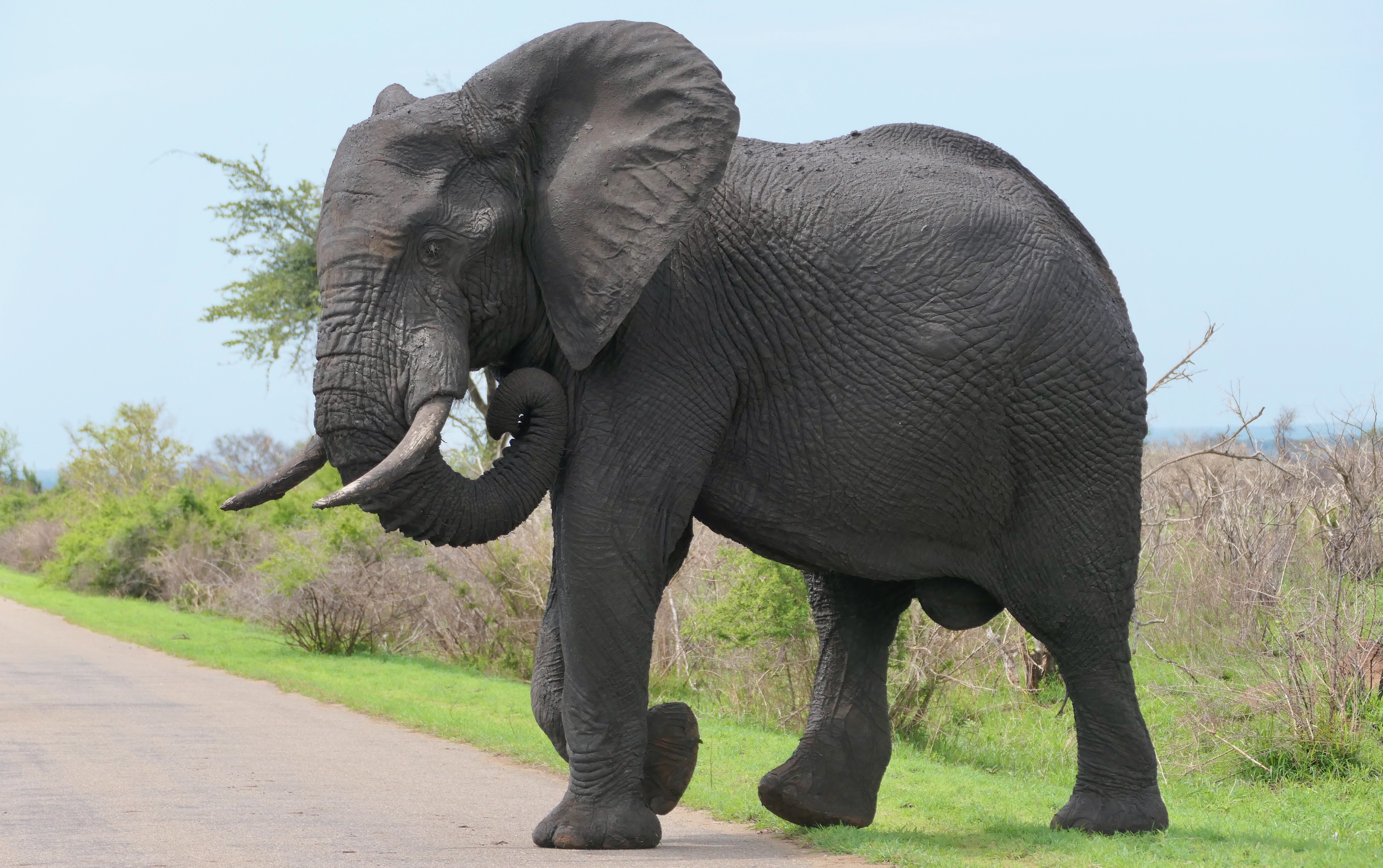
The African bush elephant

Pleistocene rewilding of parts of Brazil and other parts of the Americas was proposed by Brazilian ecologist Mauro Galetti in 2004. He suggested the introduction of elephants (and other analogues for extinct megafauna) to private lands in the Brazilian Cerrado and other parts of the Americas. Paul S. Martin made a similar argument in favour of taxon replacement, suggesting that the megafauna of North America which became extinct after the arrival of humans (e.g., mastodons, mammoths, ground sloths, and smilodons) could be replaced with species which have similar ecological roles.

The elephant sanctuary in Brazil, which was also established upon the same objective (animal welfare) with The Elephant Sanctuary in Tennessee in North America, may serve as an experimental case to examine potentials for rewilding prospects to recreate ecological niche of the extinct Gomphothere (Cuvieronius and Notiomastodon).

North, Central, and South Americas once had a variety of tortoises including giant ones, such as Hesperotestudo and Chelonoidis. Among extant species, the Red-footed and the Yellow-footed tortoises (along with the aforementioned Bolson tortoise) are candidates with higher precedence for rewilding objectives to restore seed dispersers of these continents most specifically for the Atlantic Forest regions.

Camelidae is among particular cases. Late-Pleistocene - Holocene South America has (had) native camelids (Note: Extant Guanaco and Vicuna, and extinct Eulamaops, Hemiauchenia, and Palaeolama.), however the last North American camel Camelops, which can be a subject for Pleistocene Rewilding in North America, has not been found from South America while the southern continent had its own similarly built Macraucheniidae (such as Macrauchenia and Xenorhinotherium).

Akin to Australia, prospects for counting introduced species (such as livestocks, antelopes, the "cocaine hippos") as potential proxies for extinct native megafauna may be applicable for South America, which had also lost most of its native megafaunas. Hippidion was a native Quaternary equid, and the continent currently hosts feral horse populations notably the Criollo horse.

=== Australia ===
Animals already introduced

- Tasmanian devil (to New South Wales)

Extant outside Australia

- Western long-beaked echidna (specimen collected in the early 20th century in the Kimberley region of Western Australia, a possible relic population continues to exist there)
- Dwarf cassowary
- Northern cassowary
- Komodo dragon (also potentially serves as proxy for Megalania)
- New Zealand pigeon (endemic race was exterminated on Lord Howe Island)
- New Zealand kākā (proxy for the Norfolk kākā that was exterminated on Norfolk Island)

Considered for reintroduction

- Australian sea lion (possible reintroduction to Bass Strait)
- Emu on Tasmania and adjacent islands (serves as a proxy for Tasmanian emu, King Island emu, and Kangaroo Island emu)

== Pleistocene rewilding on island landmasses ==
Megafauna that arose on insular landmasses were especially vulnerable to human influence because they evolved in isolation from other landmasses, and thus were not subjected to the same selection pressures that surviving fauna were subject to, and many forms of insular megafauna were wiped out after the arrival of humans. Therefore, scientists have suggested introducing closely related taxa to replace the extinct taxa. This is being done on several islands, with replacing closely related or ecologically functional giant tortoises to replace extinct giant tortoises.

For example, the Aldabra giant tortoise has been suggested as a replacement for the extinct Malagasy giant tortoise, and Malagasy radiated tortoises have been introduced to Mauritius to replace the tortoises that were present there. However, the usage of tortoises in rewilding experiments have not been limited to replacing extinct tortoises. At the Makauwahi Cave Reserve in Hawaii, exotic tortoises are being used as a replacement for the extinct moa-nalo, a large flightless duck hunted to extinction by the first Polynesians to reach Hawaii. The grazing habits of these tortoises control and reduce the spread of invasive plants, and promote the growth of native flora.

=== British Isles ===
Animals already introduced (including semi-wild animals)

- European bison in West Blean and Thornden Woods (5 animals including a calf born in 2022)
- Horse such as Exmoor pony
- Eurasian elk

=== Madagascar ===
Animals already introduced

- Aldabra giant tortoise

=== Maritime Southeast Asia ===
Considered for reintroduction

- Malayan tapir (a proxy for giant tapir on Java, but prehistoric occurrence of tapir on Borneo is debated)

=== Wrangel Island ===
Animals already introduced

- Muskox
- Reindeer

== See also ==
- Woolly mouse
- De-extinction
- Endangered species
- List of introduced species
