= Dzikie Pola =

Dzikie Pola or Dikoe Pole - Дикое Поле (wild plain) can refer to:

- Zaporizhzhia (region), a historical region of modern Ukraine
- Wild Field (wilderness reserve), in Russian Дикое поле (Dikoe pole), a wilderness reserve in Tula Oblast in the European part of Russia
- Dzikie Pola (role-playing game), a Polish role-playing game, set in the 17th century Polish-Lithuanian Commonwealth
