= Northeast Science Station =

Northeast Science Station Северо-Восточная научная станция РАН
- Research station
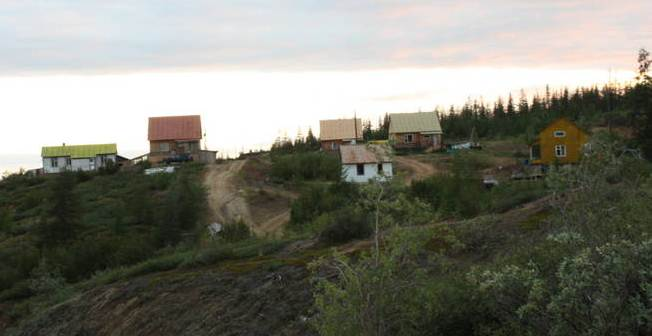

- Location in Sakha Republic, Russia
- Coordinates: 68.73987°N 161.3999°E
- Country: Russia
- Territory: Sakha Republic
- Region: Siberia
- Founded: 1977
- Director: Nikita Zimov
- Time zone: UTC+11 (Magadan Time)

The Northeast Science Station of the RAS (Russian: Северо-Восточная научная станция РАН) is an Arctic research station located in Chersky, Sakha Republic in Northeast Siberia. It is one of the world's three largest Arctic stations.

== Description ==
The Northeast Science Station is used as a year-round base for international research in arctic biology, geophysics, and atmospheric physics. The station also houses the administration of the Pleistocene Park, a local experimental wildlife preserve of 160 km^{2}.

Named after Russian explorer Jan Czerski, Chersky is sited on frozen Pleistocene carbon. The sediments here are made up of 50% ice, and 50% loess, which is a windblown sediment - the carbon content of loess deposits is five times that of a rainforest floor. During each annual melt between 2 and 5% of the stored carbon in the loess deposits is lost.

Far Eastern Federal University is planning to open an Arctic campus at the research station. “At the station, students and young scientists will study permafrost melting; greenhouse gas emissions; hydrates conservation; biodiversity; land, atmosphere and surrounding seas pollution; and other climatic, biological and environmental issues,” according to a press release.

== Personnel and funding ==
Resident staff consists of Nikita Zimov (director), Sergey Davydov, Galina Zimova, Sergey Zimov, Anastasija Zimova (bookkeeper). Additionally, around sixty international researchers visit the institute annually.

Salary of the resident staff is paid by the parent organisation, the Russian Academy of Sciences. The station itself is funded by the Max Planck Society.

== See also ==
- List of research stations in the Arctic
- Sergey Zimov
- Katey Walter
- Pleistocene Park
- Wild Field (wilderness reserve)
