= Wild Field (disambiguation) =

Wild Field (Russian: Дикое поле) is a 2008 Russian film directed by Mikheil Kalatozishvili.

Wild Field or Wild Fields may also refer to:

- Wild Field (wilderness reserve) (Russian: Дикое поле), a wilderness reserve in Tula Oblast in the European part of Russia which was created as a southern branch of Pleistocene Park
- Wild Fields (Ukrainian: Дике Поле, Russian: Дикое Поле, Polish: Dzikie pola, Lithuanian: Dykra), a very sparsely populated historical region roughly congruent to the Pontic steppe north of the Black Sea and Azov Sea in eastern Europe
