= Pleistocene Park =

Ecological experiment to make an Ice Age-Like Reserve

- Плейстоценовый парк
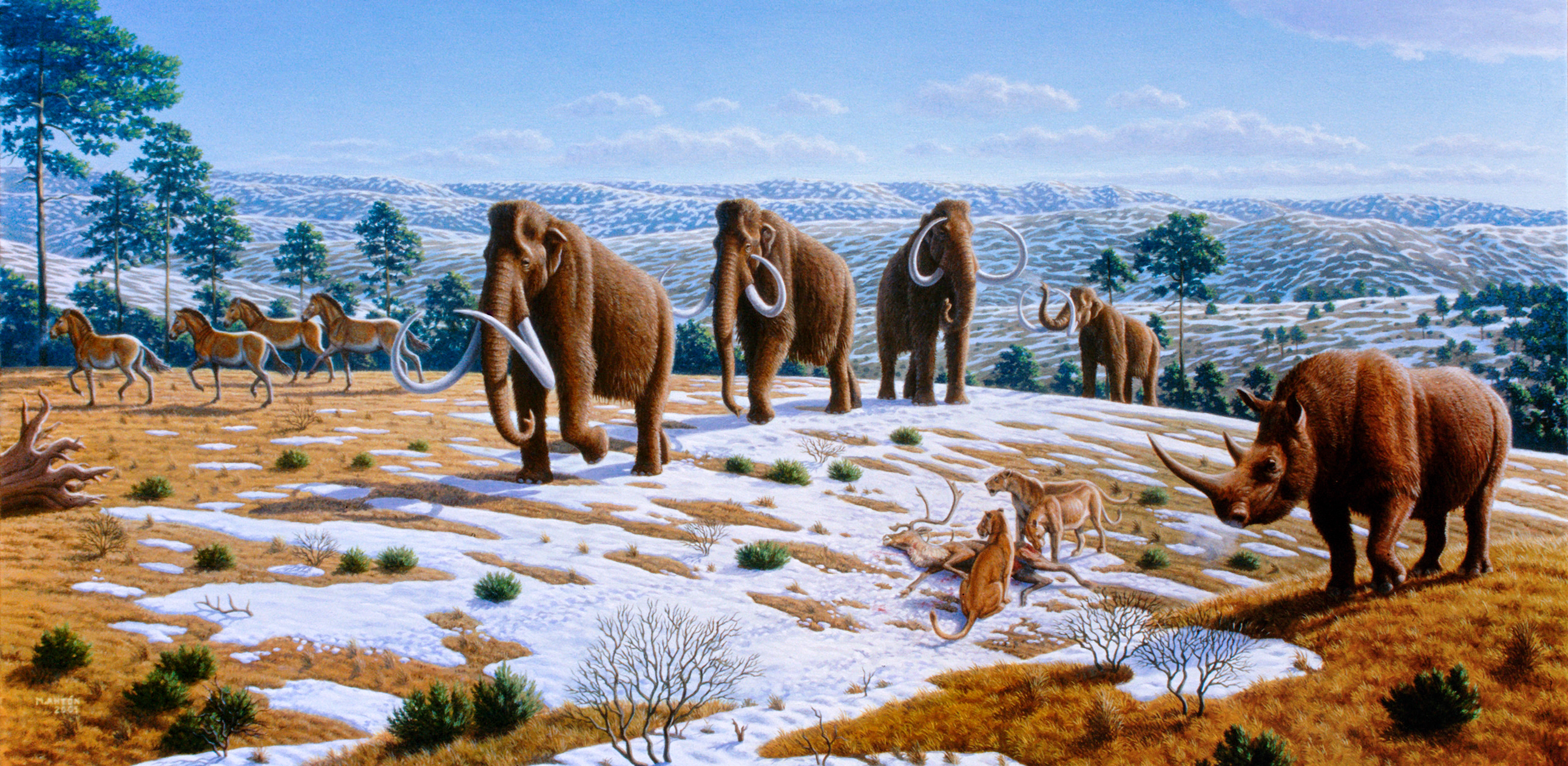
- Depiction of some mammals common in northern Eurasia during the late Pleistocene, by Mauricio Antón. From left to right: wild horse, woolly mammoth, reindeer, cave lion and woolly rhinoceros.

- Location within Russia
- Location: Russian Arctic, Sakha Republic
- Nearest city: Chersky
- Coordinates: 68°30′48″N 161°31′32″E
- Area: 144 km^{2} (60 sq mi)
- Established: 1988 / 1996
- Founder: Sergey Zimov
- Director: Nikita Zimov
- Website: pleistocenepark.ru

Pleistocene Park (Russian: Плейстоценовый парк, romanized: Pleystotsenovyy park) is a nature reserve in northeastern Siberia, Russia, where Russian scientists Sergey and Nikita Zimov are attempting to re-create the Mammoth steppe that existed during the last glacial period by repopulating the area with large herbivores, in order to mitigate climate change.

The Zimovs hypothesise that the change from tundra to grassland will cool the permafrost and reduce emission of greenhouse gases. According to them, removal and trampling of snow by animals would reduce the insulation of the permafrost. Increased albedo in grasslands versus forests, would reflect more energy back and keep the ground cooler. To study this, they released several species of large herbivores and monitored their effect on the local flora and permafrost. Preliminary results show that the ecologically low-grade tundra biome converted into a productive grassland biome.

== Overview ==
Pleistocene Park is located on the Kolyma River south of Chersky in the Sakha Republic which is in northeastern Siberia, Russia. It consists of willow brush, grasslands, swamps, forests and a multitude of lakes.The average temperature in January is about −33 °C and in July +12 °C; annual precipitation is 200–250 mm. The entire area of Pleistocene park is 144 km^{2} of which about 20 km^{2} are fenced in.

The project is founded by Russian scientist Sergey Zimov and led by Nikita Zimov, It is mostly funded by the Northeast Science Station. The goal is to recreate the northern subarctic steppe grassland ecosystem that flourished in the area during the last glacial period in order to mitigate climate change. In order for the ecosystem to change from tundra to grassland, they raised the animal density artificially by fencing in and concentrating the existing large herbivores, and introducing species that are locally extinct.

== Scientific background ==
Permafrost degradation causes microbes to consume buried organic matter, excreting carbon dioxide and methane. Methane is a potent greenhouse gas and has the potential to initiate a positive feedback cycle.

Graphical representation of the Pleistocene Park hypothesis

The Zimovs believe that recreating the highly productive mammoth steppe ecosystem can delay permafrost thawing and that the mammoth steppe can be recreated by introducing herbivores. Herbivores maintain the steppe ecosystem by increasing nutrient cycling by having the decomposition of plant matters take place in their warm stomachs. Grazing and trampling keep slower-growing competing plants like shrubs and mosses at bay, and grasses form deep root systems in order to get their required water, resulting in dry, oxygenated soils.

The Zimovs propose four different mechanisms by which the recreation of the mammoth steppe can cool the permafrost and increase carbon sequestration. These are permafrost preservation by snow trampling of animals, carbon sequestration underground, albedo effect, and methane-emission reduction.

=== Permafrost preservation by snow trampling of animals ===
Comparison of soil temperature observations (°C) at 90 cm depth inside and outside the Pleistocene Park during one year.

In the winter in the Arctic, it can get down to −50 °C. However, snow on the ground contains a lot of air so that it forms an insulating blanket over the permafrost. The Zimovs proposed that animals looking for forage trample the snow decrease the snow depth and thereby decrease ground temperature.

=== Carbon sequestration underground ===
Boxplots for total organic carbon (TOC) data of intensive, occasional, and non-grazed sampling sites in and outside Pleistocene Park

Arctic grazing experiments show that grazing can improve productivity and soil nitrogen. The mammoth steppe had a high ecosystem productivity. This increase in productivity would accumulate carbon in the soil. Intense summer grazing stimulated the grass growth and vegetative reproduction. The limiting factor was water; therefore, grasses form deep root systems all through the 1-meter-deep active layer to the permafrost. When the grass dies, the carbon will stay in the soil in the form of roots. Animals will eat the grass off the top layer, making space for new grass, and the cycle repeats. In this ecosystem, the soil could store up to 100 kg of carbon per square meter.

In Pleistocene Park, they compared highly grazed areas to non-grazed comparable areas in two different types of landscape: the thermokarst basin and the upland area. They found that the carbon accumulation in the top layer of highly grazed areas was six times higher in the thermokarst basin and twice as high in the upland area. This was observed after 23 years of grazing.

=== Albedo effect ===
Albedo is the fraction of sunlight reflected from Earth's surface. A lighter the surface has a higher albedo and reflects more energy back to space. This has a cooling effect. Snow and ice have very high albedos, and absorbed shortwave radiation is about three times lower than over non-snow-covered surfaces.

Net carbon impact and albedo offset

Vegetation changes albedo dramatically. Trees are darker and absorb more solar radiation than other vegetation, leading to warmer winter temperatures. Even though planting trees is often used as a climate mitigation strategy because of their ability to sequester carbon, in many places in the world the lower albedo of forests could completely negate the positive climate effects and can even be a net negative, creating a warming effect instead.

Trees in the Arctic do not sequester a lot of carbon because they grow extremely slowly and are subject to forest fires. This means that in many places in the Arctic, the positive effects of trees are minimal, while the negative effects from the decreased albedo are larger.

Herbivore grazing changes the vegetation from shrubs to grasses and thereby increases albedo. Several years of year-round measurement of albedo in Pleistocene Park show substantially higher albedo compared with most modern ecosystems like larch forest and shrublands, with the most dramatic difference in April and early May.

=== Methane emissions reduction ===
Methane is a greenhouse gas that is 24 times as potent as CO_{2}. Permafrost produces methane underwater, in anaerobic conditions. Fast-growing grasses need much more water than trees because they evaporate more water through photosynthesis. They drain the soil and reduce methane production. Methane production has been shown to be significantly reduced in the park, compared to a similar area outside of the park that had not been subjected to grazing.

== History ==
=== 1988–2004 ===
The first grazing experiments began in 1988 at the Northeast Science Station in Chersky with Yakutian horses. In 1996, they built a 50-hectare (120-acre; 0.50 km^{2}) enclosure. As a first step in recreating the ancient landscape, the Yakutian horses were introduced, as horses had been the most abundant ungulates on the northeastern Siberian mammoth steppe. Of the first 40 horses, 15 were killed by predators and 12 died of eating poisonous plants. More horses were imported, and they learned to cope with the environment. In 2006 approximately 20 horses lived in the park, and by 2007 more horses were being born annually than died. By 2013, the number had risen to about 30. Moose, already present in the region, were also introduced. The effects of large animals (mammoths and wisents) on nature were artificially created by using an engineering tank and an 8-wheel-drive Argo all-terrain vehicle to crush pathways through the willow shrub.

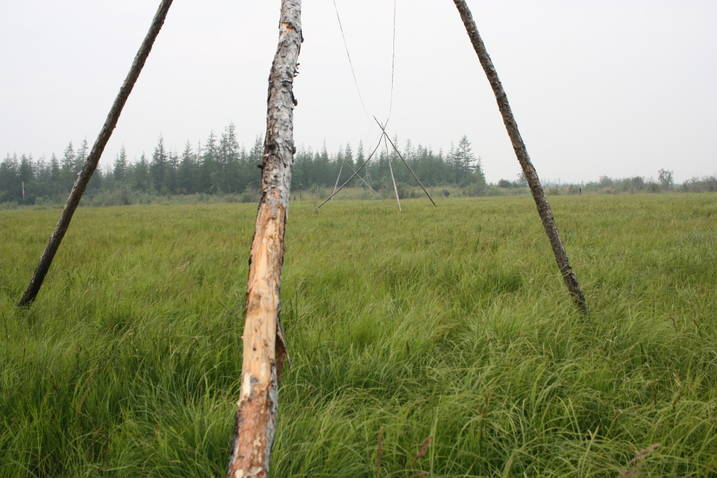
Restored grasslands in Pleistocene Park

The vegetation in the park started to change. In the areas where the horses grazed, the soil has been compacted, and mosses, weeds, and willow shrub were replaced by grasses. Flat grassland is now the dominating landscape inside the park. Permafrost was also influenced by the grazers. When air temperature sank to −40 °C (−40 °F) in winter, the temperature of the ground was found to be only −5 °C (23 °F) under an intact cover of snow, but −30 °C (−22 °F) where the animals had trampled down the snow. The grazers thus help keep permafrost intact, thereby lessening the amount of methane released by the tundra.

=== 2004–2011 ===
In the years 2004–2005, they erected a new fence, creating an enclosure of 16 km^{2} (6.2 mi^{2}). The new enclosure finally allowed a more rapid development of the project. After the fence was completed, reindeer were brought into the park from herds in the region. To increase moose density in the park, special constructions were added to the fence in several places that allow animals outside the fenced area to enter the park, while not allowing them to leave. Besides that, wild moose calves were caught in other regions and transported to the park.

In 2007, a 32-metre-high (105-foot) tower was built in the park that constantly monitors the levels of methane, carbon dioxide, and water vapor in the park's atmosphere.

In September 2010, they introduced 6 male muskox from Wrangel Island, but 2 muskoxen died in the first months: one from unknown causes, and the other from infighting among the muskoxen. Seven months later, in April 2011, 6 Altai wapiti and 5 wisents arrived at the park; the wapiti were from the Altai Mountains and the wisents from Prioksko-Terrasny Nature Reserve, near Moscow. The enclosing fence proved too low for the wapiti, and by the end of 2012 all 6 had jumped the fence and run off.

=== 2011–2016 ===
In the years 2011–2016, progress slowed down as most energy was put into the construction of a 150-hectare (370-acre) branch of Pleistocene Park near the city of Tula in Tula Oblast in Europe.

=== 2017–2020 ===
In 2017 they shifted their attention back to the further development of Pleistocene Park. A successful crowdfunding effort provided funding for further animal acquisitions. Later that year, 12 domestic yak and 30 domestic sheep were brought to the park.

In 2018, they bought 15 Kalmykian cows, which arrived in Pleistocene Park in the autumn.

In February of 2020, Pleistocene Park started a Patreon page, and in the spring, there was a successful expedition to get 10 new Yakutian horses. They traveled 800 km by truck over ice roads to the village of Aleko Kuel. The journey was filmed by Denis Sneguirev for the documentary The Zimov Hypothesis.

== Administration ==
Pleistocene Park is owned and administered by a non-profit corporation, the Pleistocene Park Association, consisting of the ecologists from the Northeast Science Station in Chersky and the Grassland Institute in Yakutsk. The present park area was signed over to the association by the state and is exempt from land tax. The reserve is surrounded by a 600 km^{2} buffer zone that will be added to the park by the regional government once the animals have successfully established themselves.

== Visitors ==
The park is a hub for international scientists and students, who come from around the world to conduct their own ecological research and experiments.

== Reception ==
A point of concern is doubt that the majority of species can be introduced in such harsh conditions. For example, according to some critics, the Yakutian horses, although they have been living in the park for several generations, would not have survived without human intervention. They normally tolerate –60 °C, but are said to cope poorly with an abundance of snow and possibly would have died of starvation in the first snowy winter. However, horses of much less primitive stock abandoned by the Japanese Army have been living feral on some uninhabited Kuril Islands since 1945. Despite the deep snows (two to three times deeper than in Yakutia), they have successfully survived all the winters without feeding. And in Pleistocene Park, while some of the Yakutian horses accept supplementary feeding, others keep away and survive on their own.

=== Positive reception ===
The Zimovs' concept of Pleistocene Park and repopulating the mammoth steppe is listed as one of the "100 most substantive solutions to global warming" by Project Drawdown. The list, encompassing only technologically viable, existing solutions, was compiled by a team of over 200 scholars, scientists, policymakers, business leaders, and activists; for each solution, the carbon impact through the year 2050, the total and net cost to society, and the total lifetime savings were measured and modeled.

In January 2020, a study co-authored by Nikita Zimov and three University of Oxford researchers assessed the viability of the park's goals when implemented on a larger scale. It was estimated that if three large-scale experimental areas were set up, each containing 1000 animals and costing US$114 million over a ten-year period, that 72,000 metric tons of carbon could be held and generate US$360,000 in carbon revenues.

A feature-length documentary, Pleistocene Park, was released in 2022, directed by Luke Griswold-Tergis.

== See also ==
- Pleistocene rewilding
- Colossal Biosciences
- Revival of the woolly mammoth
- Wild Field (wilderness reserve)

== Media ==
=== Literature ===
- Sergey A. Zimov (2005): ″Pleistocene Park: Return of the Mammoth's Ecosystem.″ In: Science, 6 May 2005, vol. 308, no. 5723, pp. 796–798. Accessed 5 May 2013..
- Aleksandr Markov (2006): ″Good Fence for Future Mammoth Steppes.″ Translated by Anna Kizilova. Russia-InfoCentre website, 21 January 2007. Accessed 5 May 2013..
- Sergei Zimov (2007): ″Mammoth Steppes and Future Climate.″ In: Science in Russia, 2007, pp. 105–112. Article found in: www.pleistocenepark.ru/en/ – Materials. Accessed 5 May 2013..
- Adam Wolf (2008): ″The Big Thaw.″ In: Stanford Magazine, Sept.–Oct. 2008, pp. 63–69. Accessed 7 May 2013.. – PDF of print version, found in: www.pleistocenepark.ru/en/ – Materials. Accessed 7 May 2013..
- Arthur Max (2010): ″Russian Scientist Working To Recreate Ice Age Ecosystem.″ In: The Huffington Post, 27 November 2010. Accessed 7 May 2013..
- Martin W. Lewis (2012): ″Pleistocene Park: The Regeneration of the Mammoth Steppe?″ and ″Pleistocene Re-Wilding: Environmental Restoration or Ecological Heresy?″ In: GeoCurrents, 12 respectively 14 April 2012. Accessed 2 May 2013..
- Sergey A. Zimov, Nikita S. Zimov, F. Stuart Chapin III (2012): "The Past and Future of the Mammoth Steppe Ecosystem." (doi). In: Julien Louys (ed.), Paleontology in Ecology and Conservation, Berlin Heidelberg, Springer-Verlag 2012. Accessed 4 November 2017..
- S.A. Zimov, N.S. Zimov, A.N. Tikhonov, F.S. Chapin III (2012): ″Mammoth steppe: a high-productivity phenomenon.″ In: Quaternary Science Reviews, vol. 57, 4 December 2012, pp. 26–45. Accessed 10 February 2014..
- Damira Davletyarova (2013): ″The Zimovs: Restoration of the Mammoth-Era Ecosystem, and Reversing Global Warming.″ In: Ottawa Life Magazine, 11 February 2013. Accessed 6 June 2013..
- Eli Kintisch (2015): "Born to rewild. A father and son's quixotic quest to bring back a lost ecosystem – and save the world." In: Science, 4 December 2015, vol. 350, no. 6265, pp. 1148–1151. (Alternative version on the Pulitzer Center on Crisis Reporting website.) Accessed 26 September 2016..
- Ross Andersen (2017): "Welcome to Pleistocene Park. In Arctic Siberia, Russian scientists are trying to stave off catastrophic climate change—by resurrecting an Ice Age biome complete with lab-grown woolly mammoths." In: The Atlantic, April 2017. Accessed 10 March 2017..
- Adele Peters (2017): "Home, home on the ферма. Meet The Father-Son Duo Importing American Bison To Siberia To Save The Planet." In: Fast Company, 21 March 2017. Accessed 29 March 2017..
- Animal People, Inc. (2017): "An Interview with Nikita Zimov, Director of Pleistocene Park." In: Animal People Forum, 2 April 2017.
- Noah Deich (2017): "Mammoths, Permafrost & Soil Carbon Storage: A Q&A about Pleistocene Park." Interview with Dr. Guy Lomax of the Natural Climate Initiative at The Nature Conservancy. Center for Carbon Removal, 3 April 2017.
