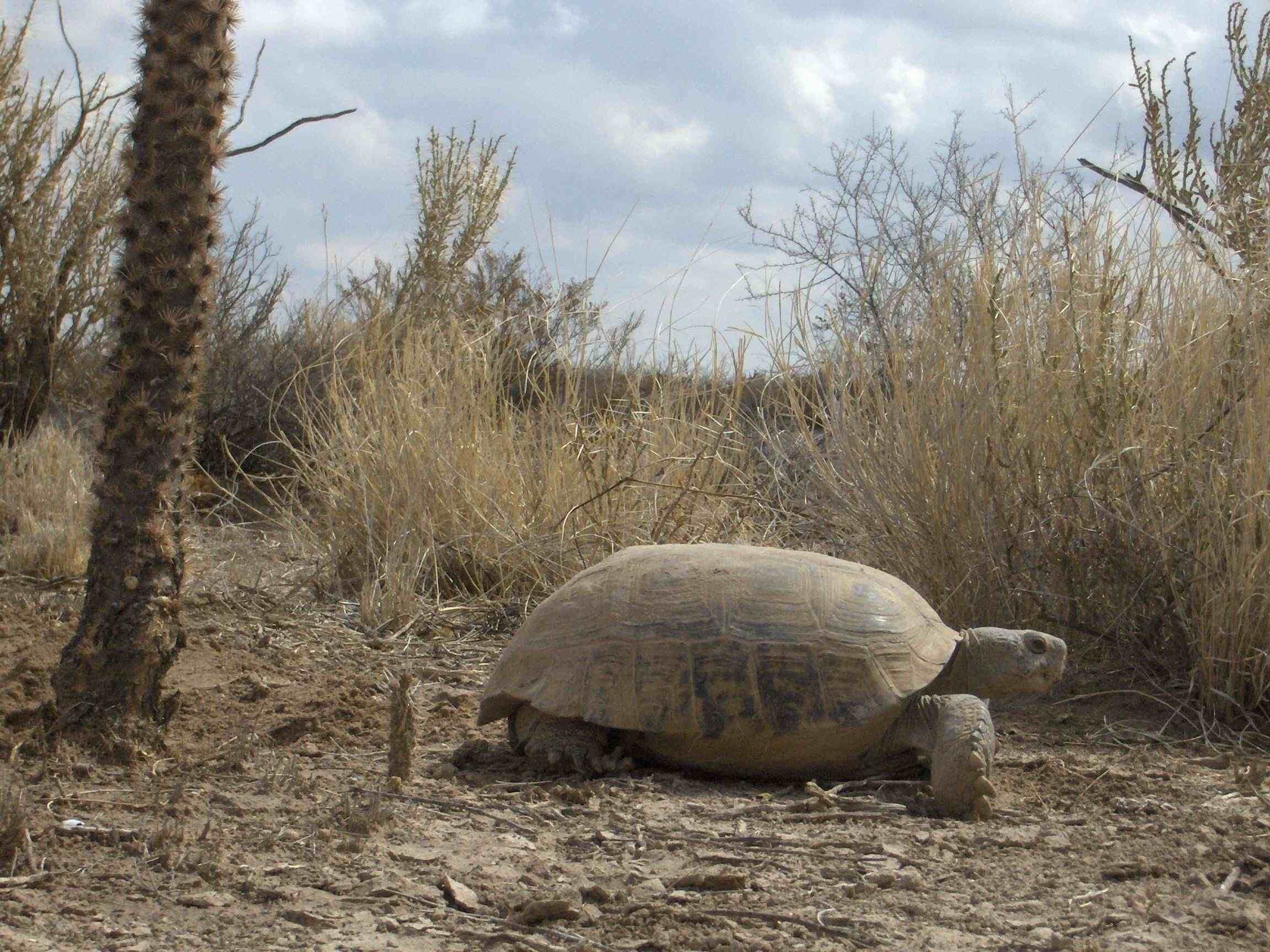
- Bolson tortoise

Conservation status
- Critically Endangered (IUCN 3.1)
- CITES Appendix I

Scientific classification
- Kingdom: Animalia
- Phylum: Chordata
- Class: Reptilia
- Order: Testudines
- Suborder: Cryptodira
- Family: Testudinidae
- Genus: Gopherus
- Species: G. flavomarginatus

Binomial name
- Gopherus flavomarginatus Legler, 1959

Synonyms
- Gopherus flavomarginatus Legler, 1959; Gopherus polyphemus flavomarginatus Wermuth & Mertens, 1961; Gopherus huecoensis Strain, 1966; Gopherus flavomarginata Auffenberg, 1974

= Bolson tortoise =

Species of reptile

The Bolson tortoise (Gopherus flavomarginatus), also called the Mexican giant tortoise, Mexican gopher tortoise, yellow-bordered tortoise or yellow-margined tortoise, is a species of tortoise from North America. Of the six North American tortoise species, it is the largest, having a carapace length of about 46 cm (18 in). It lives in a region of the Chihuahuan Desert known as the Bolsón de Mapimí, which is located in north-central Mexico.

== Discovery ==

The Bolson tortoise was discovered by scientists only in 1959. The legend is that a group of biologists working in the Bolsón de Mapimí were at a ranch and saw chickens eating out of a large tortoise shell. They inquired about the origin of the shell and the locals responded by saying that it was, "la tortuga grande del desierto", the big turtle of the desert.

In 1979 the 340,000 hectare Mapimi Biosphere Reserve was created to protect the Bolson tortoise and other unique flora and fauna of the Bolsón de Mapimí. Despite this designation, cattle ranching and mining still occur in the reserve. Whether this is detrimental to the tortoise is not known.

== Declining population ==
The most recent research, published in 1991 from data collected in 1983, estimates that fewer than 10,000 tortoises remain in the wild. Populations have declined mostly due to overcollecting for food and the pet trade. Incursion of roads, railroads and agricultural development have accelerated the decline of the species in the last 40 years. In the central portion of its range locals are keenly aware of the tortoise's protected status and aid in its conservation. However, in the northeastern portion of its range, near La Sierra Mojada, populations of the tortoise are low. It is believed that tortoises are still collected and eaten in this area. Additionally, extensive brush clearing operations are being conducted to make way for cattle grazing. In 2008, following the construction of federally subsidized ethanol plants, extensive corn farming operations began within the Mapimi Biosphere Reserve. Farms have been tilled in tortoise habitat, despite its protected status. In 2018, the IUCN Tortoise and Freshwater Turtle Specialist Group recommended a re-assessment and re-classification of all six Gopherus species. This reclassification would move G. flavomarginatus from Vulnerable (VU) to Critically Endangered (CR)

== Appleton tortoises ==
In the fall of 2006, 26 Bolson tortoises were translocated from the Audubon Appleton-Whittell Research Ranch in Elgin, Arizona to Ted Turner's Armendaris Ranch in south-central New Mexico, a Chihuahuan desert environment within the prehistoric range of this species along with other rare species living on the ranch such as the Mexican wolf, the black footed ferret, and the Aplomado falcon. These tortoises, known as the Appleton tortoises in commemoration of Ariel Appleton, a champion of Bolson tortoise conservation, were originally brought to Arizona from Durango, Mexico by Dr. David Morafka in 1973. Four tortoises from the Appleton population were established at the Living Desert Museum in Carlsbad, New Mexico. Both locations have active breeding programs in place.

== Rewilding ==
The Bolson tortoise was recently brought to the world's attention when, in August 2005, an article on Pleistocene rewilding appeared in the journal Nature (Donlan, et al., 2005) proposing that megafauna that became extinct in North America at the close of the Pleistocene (~12,800 years ago) be reintroduced to the continent to create a Pleistocene Park. The Bolson tortoise was the first species proposed for this restoration effort. The tortoise is unique in that, unlike mammoths, sabre-toothed cats and giant ground sloths, it is not extinct. The Turner Endangered Species Fund, who re-introduced the tortoise to New Mexico, has made it clear that the restoration of the tortoise to the Southwest is an endangered species recovery project and not a rewilding project, although elements of rewilding exist.
