= Sergey Zimov =

Russian earth scientist

Sergey Aphanasievich Zimov
- Сергей Афанасьевич Зимов
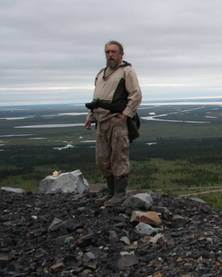
- Zimov overlooking the Siberian landscape
- Born: July 18, 1955 (age 71)
- Education: Far Eastern State Technical University
- Known for: The Northeast Science Station, Pleistocene Park, global carbon and methane cycles, Pleistocene ecosystem reconstruction
- Awards: Wolf Vishniac Award (1991)
- Scientific career
- Workplaces: Northeast Science Station

Sergey Aphanasievich Zimov (Russian: Сергей Афанасьевич Зимов; born 18 July 1955) is a Russian geophysicist who specialises in arctic and subarctic ecology. He is the Director of Northeast Scientific Station (a research institute of the Russian Academy of Sciences), a senior research fellow of the Pacific Institute for Geography (an institute within the Far East Division of the Russian Academy of Sciences (FED RAS)), and one of the founders of Pleistocene Park (a 160 km^{2} wildlife preserve and a research substation of the Northeast Scientific Station). He is best known for his work in advocating the theory that human overhunting of large herbivores during the Pleistocene caused Siberia's grassland-steppe ecosystem to disappear and for raising awareness as to the important roles permafrost and thermokarst lakes play in the global carbon cycle.

According to a colleague, Sergey Zimov is the most cited Russian earth scientist.

== Life and work ==
Sergey Zimov, born 18 July 1955, is a Russian scientist who resides in Cherskii, Sakha Republic, Russia. He studied and received his degree in geophysics from Far East State University, located in Vladivostok, Russia.

Zimov founded the Northeast Science Station near Cherskii in 1977. Twelve years later, in 1988, he began the Pleistocene Park project. In 1991, Sergei Zimov was awarded the Wolf Vishniac Award at the tenth International Symposium On Environmental Biogeochemistry (ISEB).

== Professional career ==
=== Northeast Science Station ===
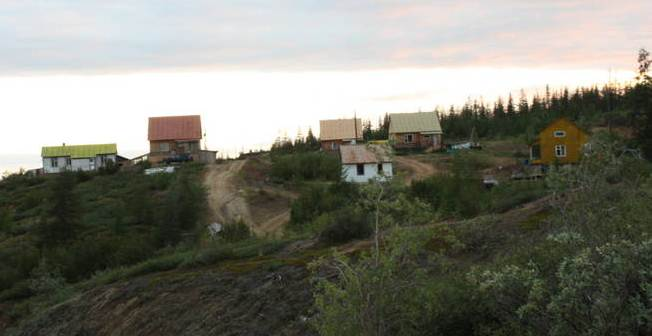
Overview of the Northeast Science Station, Cherskii, Russia

Sergey Zimov is a co-founder and the director of the Northeast Science Station, one of the world's three largest Arctic stations. Located near Cherskii, Russia on the mouth of the Kolyma River, 150 kilometers south of the Arctic Ocean, the station serves as a year-round base for international Arctic research.

In collaboration with Dr. Terry Chapin and Dr. Katey Walter-Anthony, Sergey Zimov has published a collection of scientific papers exposing the importance of permafrost and high-latitude carbon dioxide and methane emissions in the global carbon cycle. These papers identified methane ebullition from thermokarst lakes to be a significant source of atmospheric methane, a potent greenhouse gas.

=== Pleistocene Park ===
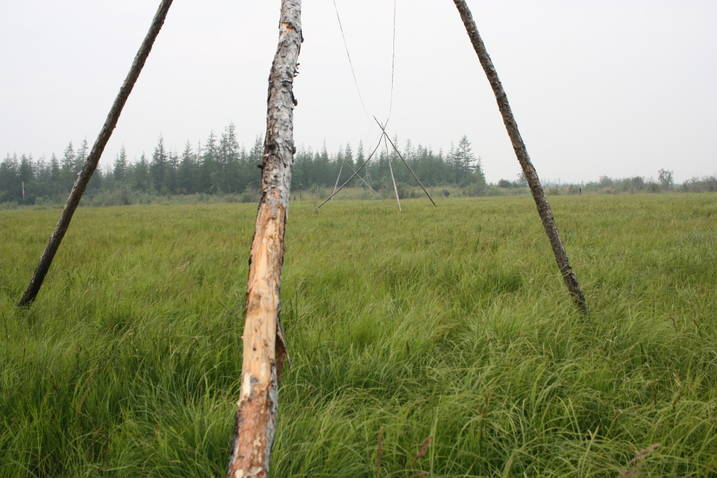
Restored grasslands in Pleistocene Park

Zimov began the Pleistocene Park project in 1988 in northeastern Siberia near the Northeast Science Station in Cherskii, Sakha Republic, Russia. Pleistocene Park seeks to test the hypotheses that large herbivores maintained the Pleistocene tundra steppe and that overhunting by humans caused both the animals and Pleistocene ecosystem to vanish.

At Pleistocene Park, Zimov is attempting to re-create the Pleistocene grasslands to demonstrate that the grasslands would have persisted into the Holocene if humans did not overhunt the herds of Pleistocene herbivores that roamed and maintained the ecosystem. He has demonstrated that grasses take over the landscape 1–2 years after mosses are anthropogenically removed.

== Selected publications ==
- Walter, K. M.; Edwards, M. E.; Grosse, G.; Zimov, S. A.; Chapin, F. S. (2007-10-26). "Thermokarst Lakes as a Source of Atmospheric CH4 During the Last Deglaciation". Science. 318 (5850): 633–636. doi:10.1126/science.1142924. ISSN 0036-8075. PMID 17962561. S2CID 31630756.

This paper estimates that 33-87% of high-latitude increases in atmospheric methane originate from thermokarst lakes. It is suggested that sediments which have been frozen since the Pleistocene, called yedoma, will have high methane-releasing potential as they thaw due to climate change.

- Walter, K. M.; Zimov, S. A.; Chanton, J. P.; Verbyla, D.; Chapin, F. S. (2006-09-07). "Methane bubbling from Siberian thaw lakes as a positive feedback to climate warming". Nature. 443 (7107): 71–75. doi:10.1038/nature05040. ISSN 0028-0836. PMID 16957728. S2CID 4415304.

This paper quantifies methane emissions from thermokarst lakes in North Siberia. Most of the methane is sourced to thawing permafrost from the lake margins.

- Zimov, Sergey A. (2005-05-06). "Pleistocene Park: Return of the Mammoth's Ecosystem". Science. 308 (5723): 796–798. doi:10.1126/science.1113442. ISSN 0036-8075. PMID 15879196. PDF

This essay outlines the concept behind Pleistocene Park, Sergei Zimov's research site in which he seeks to demonstrate that human overhunting of Pleistocene megafauna led to the disappearance of the Pleistocene's grassland-steppe ecosystem.

- Zimov, S. A.; Davidov, S. P.; Zimova, G. M.; Davidova, A. I.; Chapin, F. S.; Chapin, M. C.; Reynolds, J. F. (1999-06-18). "Contribution of Disturbance to Increasing Seasonal Amplitude of Atmospheric CO2". Science. 284 (5422): 1973–1976. doi:10.1126/science.284.5422.1973. ISSN 0036-8075. PMID 10373112. S2CID 22490220.

This paper suggests that increasing high-latitude ecological disturbances such as fires and grazing contribute to the long-term increase in atmospheric carbon dioxide.

- Zimov, Sergey A.; Schuur, Edward A. G.; Chapin, F. Stuart (2006-06-16). "Permafrost and the Global Carbon Budget". Science. 312 (5780): 1612–1613. doi:10.1126/science.1128908. ISSN 0036-8075. PMID 16778046. S2CID 129667039.

This paper contends that permafrost represents a significant global carbon sink. As climate change causes permafrost to thaw, the stored carbon will be released and amplify global climate change.

- Zimov, S. A.; Voropaev, Y. V.; Semiletov, I. P.; Davidov, S. P.; Prosiannikov, S. F.; Chapin, F. S.; Chapin, M. C.; Trumbore, S.; Tyler, S. (1997-08-08). "North Siberian Lakes: A Methane Source Fueled by Pleistocene Carbon". Science. 277 (5327): 800–802. doi:10.1126/science.277.5327.800. ISSN 0036-8075. S2CID 128837197.

This paper identifies Pleistocene-aged soils, referred to as yedoma, as being a major carbon source for methane emissions from thermokarst lakes in North Siberia.
