= Katey Walter Anthony =

American ecologist

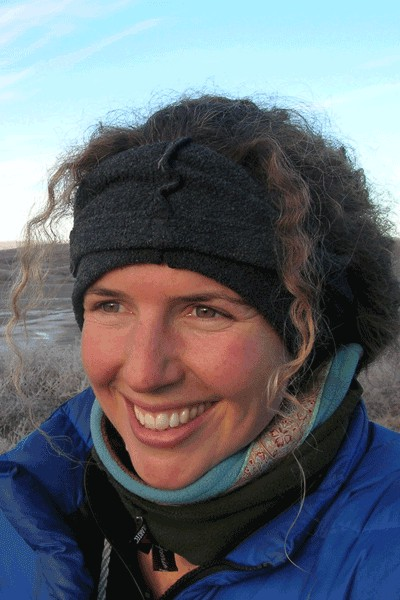
- Education: Mount Holyoke College; University of California, Davis
- Alma mater: University of Alaska
- Scientific career
- Fields: Aquatic ecology and biogeochemistry
- Thesis: Methane Emissions From Lakes In Northeast Siberia And Alaska
- Doctoral advisor: F. Stuart Chapin III

Katey M. Walter Anthony (born Katey Marion Walter) is an Alaskan aquatic ecologist and biogeochemist researching carbon and nutrient cycling between terrestrial and aquatic systems, and the cryosphere and atmosphere.

== Education ==
Walter Anthony graduated magna cum laude from Mount Holyoke College (1998). She has an M.Sc. in ecology from the University of California, Davis (2000) and a Ph.D. from the University of Alaska, Fairbanks (2006).

== Career and research ==
Walter Anthony has conducted research projects in Russia, Germany, Central America and the United States. During her master's research, Walter Anthony worked on the biogeochemistry of an invasive aquatic plant, Eurasian Watermilfoil.

In 2007, Walter Anthony started an International Polar Year Postdoctoral Fellow at the University of Alaska in Fairbanks

Walter Anthony's current research focuses on methane and carbon dioxide emissions from arctic and temperate lakes and wetlands in Alaska and Siberia, and the processes involved in greenhouse gas emissions from lakes, including thermokarst (permafrost thaw), industrial plant emissions, geology, and changes in lake area. By capturing methane flowing from lakes into the atmosphere, Walter Anthony estimated up to 2.5 Pg of carbon was released into the atmosphere during the previous 60 years. In the New York Times, Walter Anthony describes first finding bursts of methane escaping from lakes in Siberia and bubbling out of lakes in Alaska and Greenland.

Walter Anthony, who is fluent in Russian, works as project coordinator at Chersky for joint Russian-U.S. projects over the International Polar Year, aiming to network arctic observatories in Alaska and Russia for long term monitoring of climate change in cold regions. Walter Anthony is co-PI of the Arctic Observatory Network which is a project funded by the National Science Foundation that is developing long-term data sets in Alaska and Siberia.

== Awards ==
- EPA STAR Fellowship (2000)
- CGS/ProQuest Distinguished Dissertation Award (2006)
- National Wildlife Federation: National Conservation Achievement Award in Science (2009)
- National Geographic Emerging Explorer (2009)
- Mary Lyon Award from Mount Holyoke College for "exceptional promise or sustained achievement" (2010)
- Fellow, Wings WorldQuest (2011) profile
- Usibelli Award - Distinguished Research Award, University of Alaska Fairbanks (2019)
