= Wild Field (wilderness reserve) =

Nature reserve near the city of Tula, Russia

- Дикое поле
- Location within Russia
- Location: Tula Oblast, Russia
- Nearest city: Yefremov
- Coordinates: 53°20′54″N 37°57′17″E
- Area: 300 hectares (740 acres)
- Established: 2012

Wild Field (Russian: Дикое поле Dikoe pole) is a 300 ha (740 ac) nature reserve near the city of Tula in Tula Oblast in the European part of Russia, approximately 250 km (150 mi) south of Moscow. It was established in 2012 by Russian scientists Sergey Zimov and Nikita Zimov as a companion to Pleistocene Park in Siberia.

Unlike Pleistocene Park, Wild Field's primary purpose is not scientific research but public outreach, i.e. it will provide a model of what an unregulated steppe ecosystem looked like before the advent of humans. It is situated near a federal road and a railway station and is accessible to the general public.

== The reserve ==
Wild Field comprises 300 ha (740 ac) of which at first 150 ha were fenced off and stocked with animals. In 2017 the fenced area was increased to 280 hectares.

The area of the reserve will be increased to 500 ha in 2018–2019. For the future, plans call for a continuous increase of the area in relation to the increasing population of animals in the reserve.

== Animals ==
Introduced between 2012 and 2015 were

- Bashkir horses (a strain of Equus ferus caballus), from a feral herd in the southern part of the Ural Mountains,
- Altai maral/Altai wapiti (Cervus canadensis sibiricus),
- Edilbaevskaya sheep (a strain of Ovis orientalis aries),
- Roe deer (Capreolus spec.), (Note: These are the roe deer of the Tula region, which were already present on the site of Wild Field reserve. The species is not certain, as roe deer were absent in much of European Russia throughout the 20th century and only reoccupied the area in the last decades. Judging by the IUCN distribution maps, the roe deer of the Tula region should be European roe deer (Capreolus capreolus), with the westernmost extension of the range of the Siberian roe deer (Capreolus pygargus) ending approximately 500 km (300 mi) to the east.)
- Kalmykian cattle (a strain of Bos primigenius taurus),
- Domestic yaks (Bos mutus grunniens), both polled and unpolled.

The total number of large herbivores in Wild Field Park numbered around 150 in April 2015.

In 2016, several wild boars (Sus scrofa) and a female elk^{[BE]}/moose^{[AE]} (Alces alces) entered the reserve through special one-way entrances built into the fences. Several young wild boar/domestic pig hybrids (Sus scrofa × domesticus) have also been purchased to be released into the park upon maturing.

In 2017, four reindeer (Rangifer tarandus) and 73 domestic Pridonskaya goats (a strain of Capra aegagrus hircus) were added.

A herd of 20 plains bison (Bison bison bison) which was to be delivered in March 2014 by the True Nature Foundation, a European organization for ecological restoration and rewilding, could not be imported due to a blanket import ban on cattle from countries affected by the Schmallenberg virus.

The introduction of a test group of camels (Camelus spec. (Note: This must be either Camelus ferus or Camelus bactrianus, as Camelus dromedarius is not adapted to the climate of the region.)) is under consideration. Further plans call for the introduction of bison, saiga antelopes, vultures, bobak marmots and speckled ground squirrels.
