= Pubal =

European bison

- Foresters bid farewell to Pubal in 2007
- Species: European bison
- Sex: Male
- Born: c. 24 July 2005 (age 16) (Note: Pubal was found and rescued as a calf by workers on 26 July 2005; his age at the time was estimated to be at no more than two days old due to umbilical cord remnants, but his exact date of birth remains unknown as Pubal was born in the wild.); Near Rabe, Lesko County in Poland
- Notable role: Initially a local tourist attraction, then semen provider for żubroń farm

Pubal ([puˈbal] or /puːbæl/, born c. 24 July 2005) was a male European bison, or zubr, that became renowned in southeast Poland for his friendly interactions with humans and unwillingness to reintegrate into the wild. Media coverage of his numerous escapes from captivity to seek out human contact earned him a degree of popularity with the public. He has been described as one of the most famous zubrs ever and the only known case of an individual of his species retaining friendly contact with humans throughout his life.

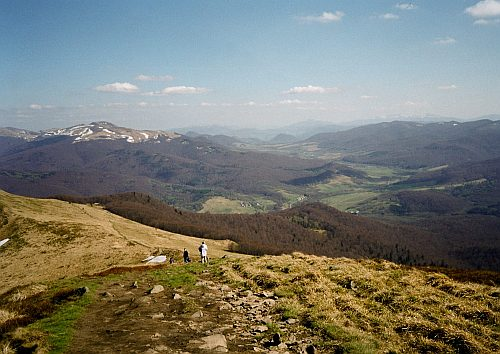
Bieszczady Mountains in Poland

== History ==
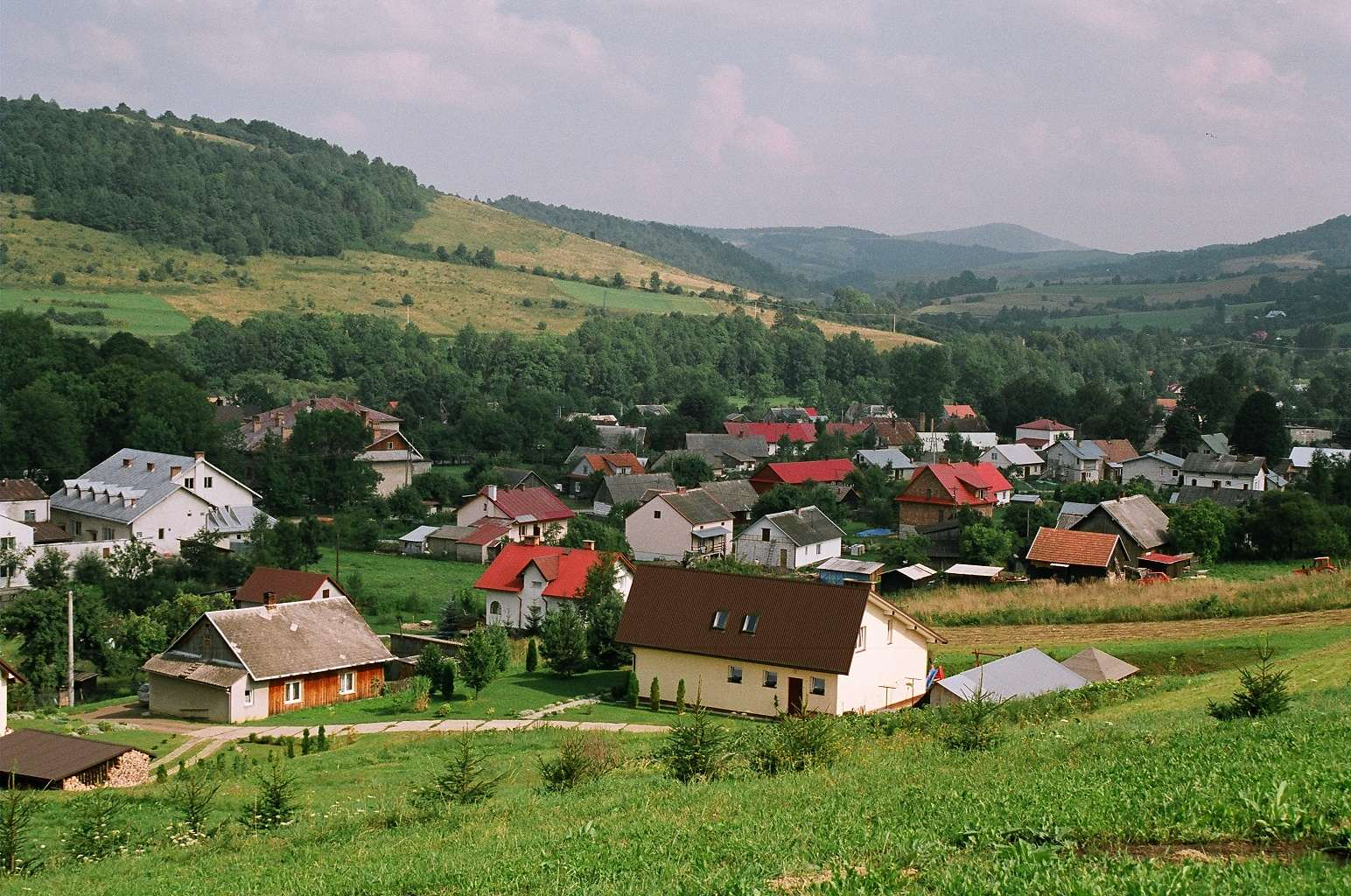
A panorama of Baligród in 2007

On 26 July 2005, a lone bison calf was discovered and rescued by charcoal burners, in Rabe near Baligród, after a flood swept across the Bieszczady Mountains. He was said to be no more than two days old judging by the umbilical cord remnants that were still present; it was speculated that the male calf was separated from his mother by the flood and thrown onto the road by the rising water levels. After waiting with him for several days for the possibility of his mother returning, the calf was taken into the care of local foresters, who named him "Pubal". Officially Pubal was not supposed to have a name as they are not given to wild animals, but the rangers who raised him and looked after him prior to his departure from the region started calling him "Pubal"; the letters "P" and "U" are reserved for the Białowieża-Caucasus race of the European bison species, while the ending "bal" comes from Nadleśnictwo Baligród or the Baligród Forestry. For nine months, the Baligród forester Witold Szybowski and his wife Urszula looked after the young zubr, initially feeding him milk with a baby bottle. Kompania Piwowarska, the brewing company of the popular Żubr beer brand, donated 2400 złoty to cover some of the growing bison's feeding costs. In April 2006, Pubal was released into the wild near a zubr herd, but he soon lost interest in rejoining his own species and continued to seek out human contact – at one point interrupting the picnic of a family of tourists and frightening them, before the group realised that he was not aggressive and completely tame.

The plan to reintroduce Pubal into the wild was carefully managed to potentially increase the genetic diversity of the group of bison that were supposed to be his new herd, but even though he was spotted in their vicinity, Pubal was relatively quickly seen on his own again, trying to find humans. Initially he was released into the valley of the San river, but due to his constant encounters with tourists Pubal was moved back to a sizeable enclosure in Wola Michowa with an older zubr named "Bolo"; this was done in hopes of getting him used to the company of his own species and to encourage Pubal to start finding his own sources of food. By early 2007, Pubal continued to resist all efforts made at reintegrating him into the wild by breaking out of his enclosures multiple times; when roaming free he was often seen wandering around local villages, approaching humans for food, walking between houses, interacting with people, and following cars.

Since Pubal weighed 250 kilograms (over 550 lbs) at this point and there were concerns that he could harm someone when frightened, a decision was made that he must leave the Bieszczady area permanently. In spring of 2007, the almost two-year-old bison was transported northwest to become the semen provider at a żubroń (domestic cattle and zubr hybrid) breeding farm in Karolew. The owner of the farm, Henryk Ordanik, had heard about Pubal on TV; Ordanik worked together with the foresters under the approval of the authorities to secure Pubal's role as a semen provider at his farm. The Subcarpathian rangers who had up until this point been looking after Pubal condemned the actions of a tour guide who had lured the animal out of his enclosure into a local town, further reinforcing Pubal's old habits of relying on people feeding him. As of September 2009, Pubal was still taking an active part in experimental żubroń breeding efforts at the facility in Karolew with a degree of success in their results. His status since then is unclear, though some sources from 2017 state that Pubal died.

== Legacy ==
In addition to the widespread media coverage of his friendly encounters with local villagers and tourists alike, Pubal has also been mentioned in a number of books and articles. A poem and an award-winning ballad have also been written about him. In 2007, TVP3 Rzeszów created and broadcast a short documentary film about Pubal entitled Żubra żal – Polish for "Regret of the Bison" or "Bison's Regret". Directed by Jacek Szarek, it received accolades such as first place at the Ninth International Touristic Film Festival "TOUR - FILM" in Poznań and was later shown to pupils at primary schools in May 2008. Although a few stories of long and solitary bison journeys have appeared in Polish history prior to this one from the mid-2000s—such as the case of Pulpit and Pulon from the 1960s—none of them featured as much and as close interaction with humans as that of Pubal.
