= West Blean and Thornden Woods =

Ancient woodland and conservation site in Kent, England

Coordinates: 51.328°N 1.088°E

- Site of Special Scientific Interest
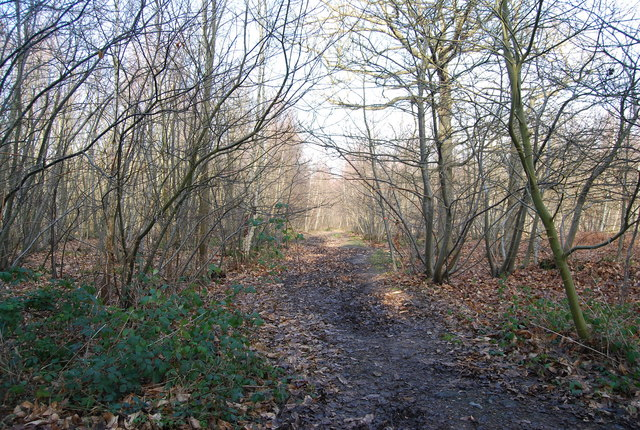
- Location of West Blean and Thornden Woods.
- Area of search: Kent
- Grid reference: TR 152 633
- Interest: Biological
- Area: 781.0 hectares (1,930 acres)
- Notification date: 1989
- Location map: Magic Map

West Blean and Thornden Woods is a 781-hectare (1,930-acre) biological Site of Special Scientific Interest north of Canterbury in Kent. It is part of the Blean Woods Nature Conservation Review site (a Grade I site), and an area of 490 hectares (1,200 acres) is a nature reserve managed by the Kent Wildlife Trust. The woods form one of the largest areas of ancient woodland in the UK, with parts of it over 1,000 years old.

These woods have more than fifty species of breeding birds, and the diverse invertebrate fauna include five nationally rare and thirteen nationally scarce species. There is also a population of the declining and protected hazel dormouse.

In July 2022, as part of the Wilder Blean project, European bison were released in to West Blean and Thornden Woods. The reintroduction to the UK in 2022, the first time in 6000 years (apart from an unsuccessful project in Scotland in 2011), consists of three females and one male. The bison's natural behaviour is expected to transform an area of former commercial pine forest into a natural woodland. Exmoor ponies, iron age pigs and English Longhorn cattle are also to be released into the woods.

There is access to the nature reserve but some areas are private land.
