= Prioksko-Terrasny Nature Reserve =

Strict nature reserve in Moscow Oblast, Russia

- IUCN category Ia (strict nature reserve)
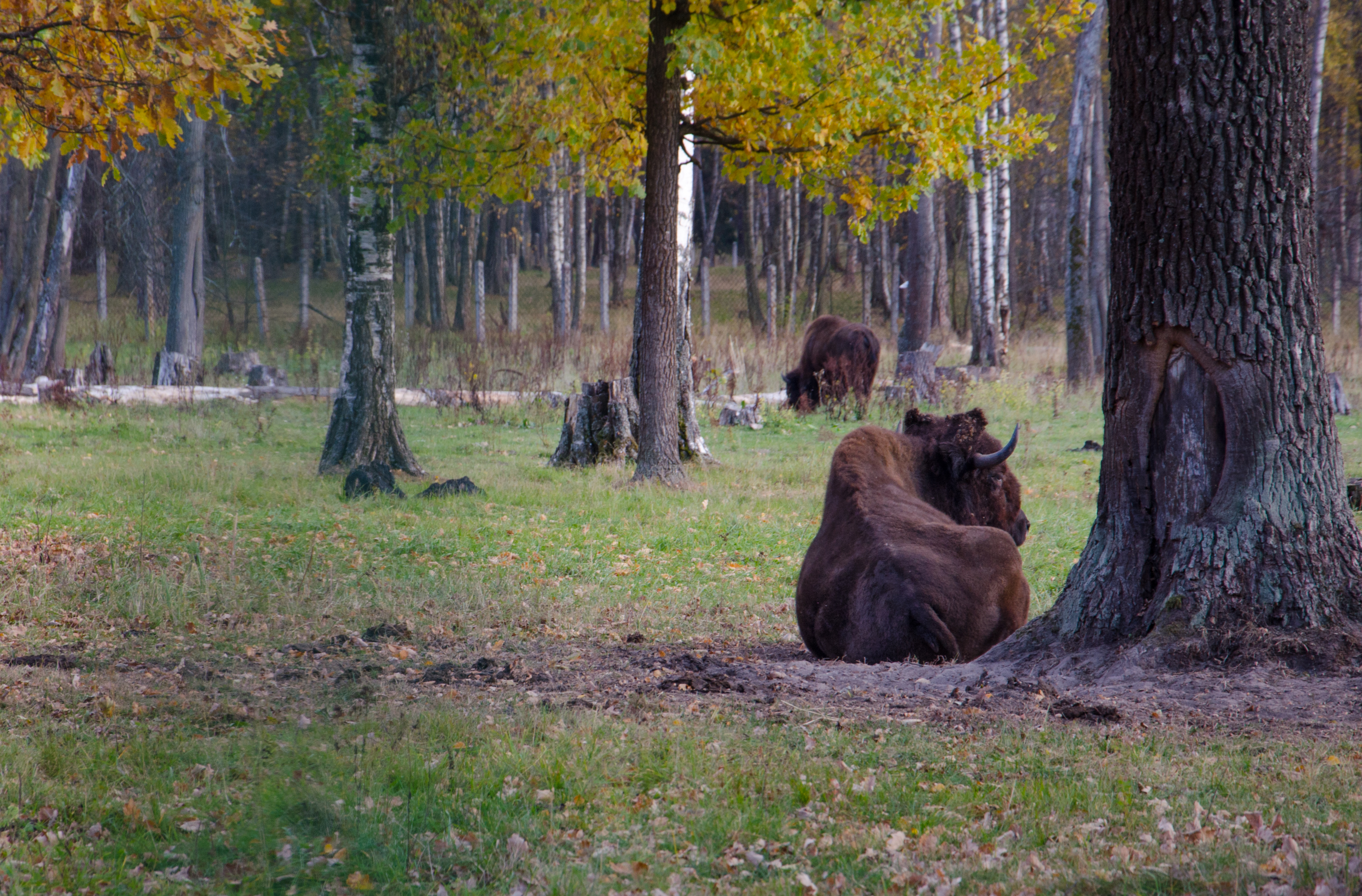
- European bison in Prioksko-Terrasny Reserve

- Location within Russia
- Location: Serpukhov, Moscow Oblast
- Nearest city: Serpukhov
- Coordinates: 54°54′13″N 37°32′48″E
- Area: 4,945 hectares (49.45 km^{2}; 19.09 mi^{2})
- Established: 1945
- Website: https://pt-zapovednik.ru/

Prioksko-Terrasny Nature Biosphere Reserve (Russian: Приокско-Террасный государственный природный биосферный заповедник Priokska-Tyerrasnyy gosudarstvyennyy prirodnyy biasfyernyy zapavyednik) is one of Russia's smallest zapovedniks (nature reserves), sprawling over an area of 5,000 hectares along the left bank of the Oka River in the Serpukhov District of Moskva Oblast. It was established in 1945 as part of the Moscow Nature Reserve and is home to 900 plant species, 130 bird species, and 54 mammal species. A wisent nursery was established in 1948 to populate the region with European bison from the Belovezhskaya Pushcha and Western Caucasus. There is also a small herd of American bison.

The important thing to scientists was that the Prioksko-Terrasny biosphere reserve is situated on the border of the subzone of European taiga with the admixture of broad-leaved species and the subzone of broad-leaved forests. The functions of reserve were in preservation of typical ecosystems and unique observation of the natural dynamics of ecosystems and their components (biota, soil, water, climate), the study of the influence of anthropogenic factors on the change in the natural state of the natural environment at the territory of the biosphere reserve and training researchers in conservation and environmental monitoring.

== Birds of the Prioksko-Terrasny State Biosphere Reserve ==
On the territory of the Prioksko-Terrasny state nature biosphere reserve, covering 4945 ha, 134 species of birds from 14 orders (Ciconiiformes, Anseriformes, Falconiformes, Galliformes, Gruiformes, Charadriiformes, Columbiformes, Cuculiformes, Strigiformes, Caprimulgiformes, Apodiformes, Coraciiformes, Piciformes, Passeriformes) had been registered by 1991. Later 5 more species were observed here. Thus, by the present time, the list of species of birds registered in the Reserve numbers 139 species. About 55% of them are Passerines. Most of the birds of the Reserve belong to migratory breeding species or to nomadic breeding species. Some species are vagrants in the Reserve and in the Moscow Region (nutcracker Nicifraga caryocatactes (L.), etc.). Birds, nesting in central parts of Russia and on the territory of the Prioksko-Terrasny Reserve, in autumn are migrating to the south-west. Part of them are wintering in southern regions of Russia and near the Black Sea, others are flying to the south-western part of Europe: the Balkans, the Apennines, South France, South Germany. The rest migrate across the Mediterranean Sea and fly to Northern Africa.

Forty-one bird species winter in the Prioksko-Terrasny Reserve. Among wintering species are: Northern goshawk Accipiter gentilis L., Eurasian sparrowhawk Accipiter nisus L., Eurasian black grouse Lyrurus tetrix L., western capercaillie Tetrao urogallus L., hazel grouse Tetrastes bonasia L., grey partridge Perdix perdix L., long-eared owl Asio otus L., Tengmalm's owl Aegolus funereus L., little owl Athene noctua Scop., Eurasian pygmy owl Glaucidium passerinum L., tawny owl Strix aluco L., European green woodpecker Picus viridis L., grey-headed woodpecker Picus canus Gm., black woodpecker Dryocopus martius L., great spotted woodpecker Dendrocopos major L., white-backed woodpecker Dendrocopos leucotos Bechst., middle spotted woodpecker Dendrocopos medius L., lesser spotted woodpecker Dendrocopos minor L., Eurasian jay Garrulus glandarius (L.), Eurasian magpie Pica pica (L.), hooded crow Corvus cornix L., common raven Corvus corax L., Bohemian waxwing Bombicilla garrulous (L.), goldcrest Regulus regulus (L.), fieldfare Turdus pilaris L., long-tailed tit Aegithalos caudatus (L.), willow tit Parus montanus Bald., crested tit Parus cristatus L., coal tit Parus ater L., blue tit Parus caeruleus L., great tit Parus major L., Eurasian nuthatch Sitta europea L., common treecreeper Certhia familiaris L., house sparrow Passer domesticus (L.), Eurasian tree sparrow ( Passer montanus L.), Eurasian siskin Spinus spinus (L.), European goldfinch Carduelis carduelis (L.), common redpoll Acanthis flammea (L.), red crossbill Loxia curvirosrta L., Eurasian bullfinch Pyrrhula pyrrhula (L.), yellowhammer Emberiza citinella L.

Prioksko-Terrasny Reserve is situated on the border of the subzone of European taiga with the admixture of broad-leaved species and of a subzone of broad-leaved forests of the western type. Owing to this phenomenon among birds in the reserve, there are species from taiga faunistic complex and species from faunistic complex of broad-leaved forests of western type. Typical representatives of taiga faunistic complex are: western capercaillie Tetrao urogallus L., hazel grouse Tetrastes bonasia L., black woodpecker Dryocopus martius L., goldcrest Regulus regulus (L.), fieldfare Turdus pilaris L., mistle thrush Turdus viscivorus L., redwing Turdus iliacus L., siskin ( Spinus spinus (L.), red crossbill Loxia curvirostra L., bullfinch Pyrrhula pyrrhula (L.).

Among typical representatives of faunistic complex of broad-leaved forests of western type are: green woodpecker Pinus viridis L., golden oriole Oriolus oriolus L., blackbird Turdus merula L., icterine warbler Hippolais icterina (Vieill.), blackcap Sylvia atricapilla (L.), pied flycatcher Ficedula hypoleuca (Pall.), common rosefinch Carpodacus erythrinus(Pall.), greenfinch Chloris chloris (L.), hawfinch Coccothraustes coccothraustes (L.). Among birds registered in the Prioksko-Terrasny Reserve, two species are enlisted in Red Data Book of the Russian Federation: Osprey Pandion haliaetus L. and great grey shrike Lanius excubitor L.

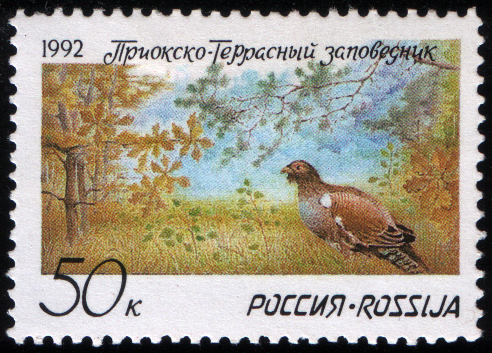
Prioksko-Terrasnyi preserve, 1992

Twenty-six species of birds registered in the Reserve are enlisted in Red Data Book of the Moscow Region. Among them: 8 species of birds of prey: Osprey Pandion haliaetus L., European honey buzzard Pernis apivorus L., black kite Milvus migrans Bodd., hen harrier Cyrcus cyaneus L., Montagu's harrier Cyrcus pygargus L., booted eagle Hieraetus pennatus Gm., greater spotted eagle Aquila clanga Pall., red-footed falcon Falco vespertinus L., 1 species of wader: Great snipe Gallinago media Lath., 1 species of dove: stock dove Columba oenas L., 3 species of owls: Eurasian eagle owl Bubo bubo L., Eurasian scops owl Otus scops L., little owl Athene noctua Scop., 2 species of roller: roller Coracius garrulous L., common kingfisher Alcedo atthis L., 1 species of hoopoe: common hoopoe Upupa epops L., 5 species of woodpecker: Green woodpecker Picus canus Gm., white-backed woodpecker Dendrocopos leucotos Bechst., middle spotted woodpecker Dendrocopos medius L., Eurasian three-toed woodpecker Picoides tridactylus L. and 5 species of passerines: wood lark Lullula arborea (L.), great grey shrike Lanius excubitor L., Eurasian nutcracker Nucifraga caryocatactes (L.), barred warbler Sylvia nisoria (Bechst.), azure tit Paruus cyanus Pall.).
