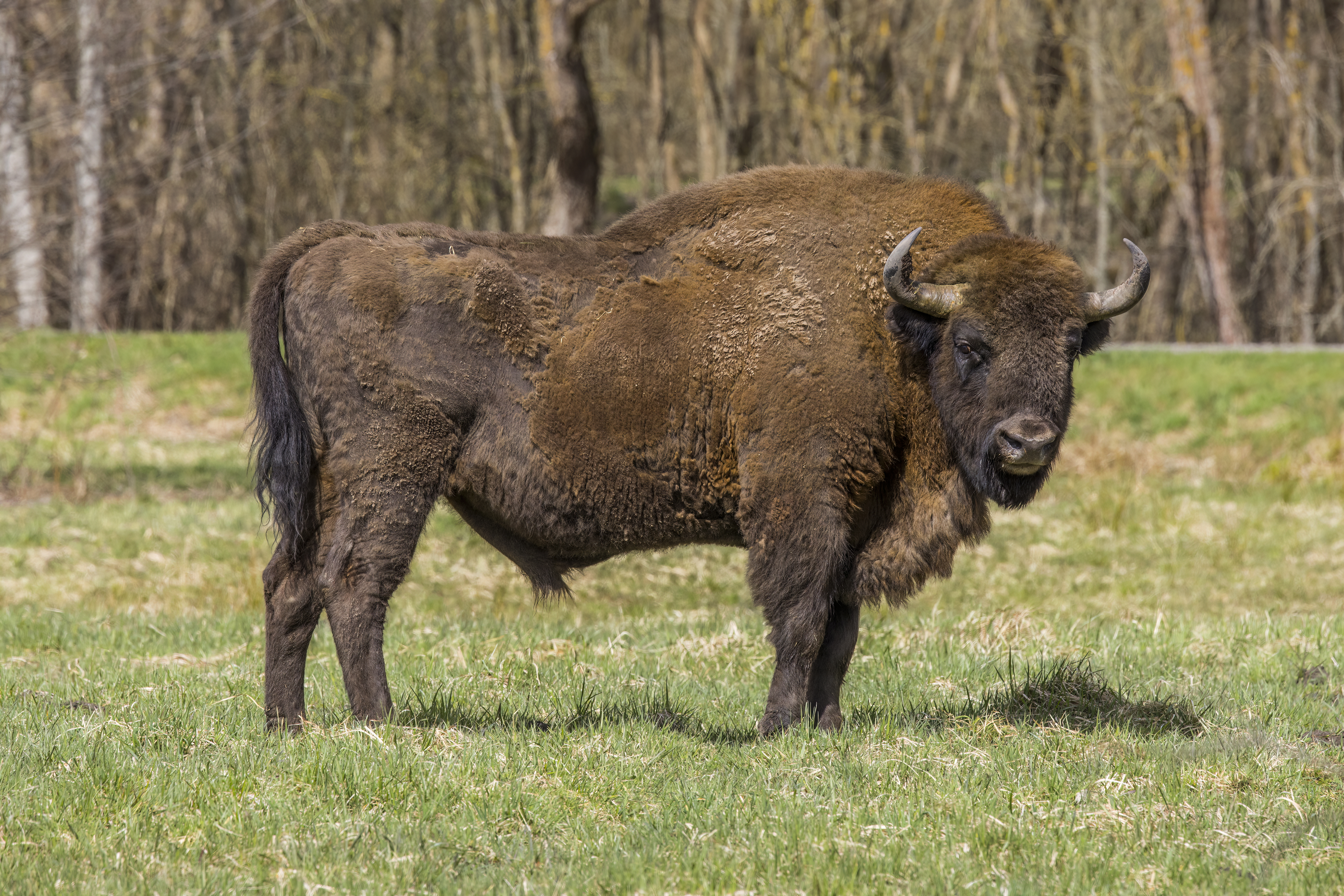
- A male bison in the process of moulting

Conservation status
- Near Threatened (IUCN 3.1)

Scientific classification
- Kingdom: Animalia
- Phylum: Chordata
- Class: Mammalia
- Order: Artiodactyla
- Family: Bovidae
- Subfamily: Bovinae
- Genus: Bos
- Subgenus: Bison
- Species: B. bonasus

Binomial name
- Bison bonasus (Linnaeus, 1758)

Subspecies
- Bison bonasus bonasus (Linnaeus, 1758); †Bison bonasus caucasicus; †Bison bonasus hungarorum
- European bison (Bison bonasus)
- Range of B. bonasus (Compiled by: IUCN (International Union for Conservation of Nature) 2020) Resident

Synonyms
- Bos bonasus Linnaeus, 1758

= European bison =

European bison Temporal range: Late Pleistocene – recent

Eurasian species of mammal

The European bison (pl.: bison) (Bison bonasus) or the European wood bison, also known as the wisent (Note: Borrowing from the German Wisent. See wisent and Wisent for etymology.) (/ˈviːzənt/ or /ˈwiːzənt/), the zubr (Note: A less commonly used name for the European bison in English, borrowed from Polish. Previously also used to refer to one race of the species. See zubr and żubr for more info.) (/ˈzuːbər/), or sometimes colloquially as the European buffalo, (Note: Used mostly in American sources. Bison are only distantly related to true buffalo.) is a European species of bison. It is one of two extant species of bison, alongside the American bison. The European bison is the heaviest wild land animal in Europe, and individuals in the past may have been even larger than their modern-day descendants. During late antiquity and the Middle Ages, bison became extinct in most of Europe and Asia, surviving into the 20th century only in northern-central Europe and the northern Caucasus Mountains. During the early years of the 20th century, the remaining bison were hunted to extinction in the wild, with domestic bison later reintroduced into the wild.

By the late 2010s, the species numbered several thousand and had been returned to the wild by captive breeding programmes. It is no longer in immediate danger of extinction, but remains absent from most of its historical range. It is not to be confused with the aurochs (Bos primigenius), the extinct ancestor of domestic cattle, with which it once co-existed. Besides humans, bison have few predators. In the 19th century, there were scattered reports of wolves, lions, tigers, and bears hunting bison. In the past, especially during the Middle Ages, humans commonly killed bison for their hide, meat and other uses such as drinking horns.

European bison were hunted to extinction in the wild in the early 20th century, with the last wild animals of the B. b. bonasus subspecies being shot in the Białowieża Forest (on today's Belarus–Poland border) in 1921. The last of the Caucasian wisent subspecies (B. b. caucasicus) was shot in the northwestern Caucasus in 1927. The Carpathian wisent (B. b. hungarorum) had been hunted to extinction by 1852. The Białowieża or lowland European bison was kept alive in captivity, and has since been reintroduced into several countries in Europe. In 1996, the International Union for Conservation of Nature classified the reintroduced European bison as an endangered species, no longer extinct in the wild. Its status has improved since then, changing to vulnerable and later to near-threatened.

European bison were first scientifically described by Carl Linnaeus in 1758. Some later descriptions treat the European bison as conspecific with the American bison. Three subspecies of the European bison existed in the recent past, but only one, the nominate subspecies (B. b. bonasus), survives today. The ancestry and relationships of the wisent to fossil bison species remain controversial and disputed. The European bison is one of the national animals of Poland and Belarus.

== Etymology ==
The ancient Greeks and ancient Romans were the first to name bison as such; the 2nd-century AD authors Pausanias and Oppian referred to them as βίσων, bisōn. Earlier, in the 4th century BC, during the Hellenistic period, Aristotle referred to bison as βόνασος, bónasos. He also noted that the Paeonians called it μόναπος (monapos). Claudius Aelianus, writing in the late 2nd or early 3rd centuries AD, also referred to the species as βόνασος, and both Pliny the Elder's Natural History and Gaius Julius Solinus used Latin: bĭson and bonāsus. Both Martial and Seneca the Younger mention bison (pl. bisontes). Later Latin spellings of the term included visontes, vesontes, and bissontes.

John Trevisa is the earliest author cited by the Oxford English Dictionary as using, in his 1398 translation of Bartholomeus Anglicus's De proprietatibus rerum, the Latin plural bisontes in English, as "bysontes" (Middle English: byſontes and bysountes). Philemon Holland's 1601 translation of Pliny's Natural History, referred to "bisontes". The marginalia of the King James Version gives "bison" as a gloss for the Biblical animal called the "pygarg" mentioned in the Book of Deuteronomy. Randle Cotgrave's 1611 French–English dictionary notes that bison was already in use in French, and it may have influenced the adoption of the word into English; alternatively, it may have been borrowed directly from Latin. John Minsheu's 1617 lexicon, Ductor in linguas, gives a definition for Bíson in Early Modern English: "a wilde oxe, great eied, broad-faced, that will neuer be tamed".

In the 18th century the name of the European animal was applied to the closely related American bison (initially in Latin in 1693, by John Ray) and the Indian bison (the gaur, Bos gaurus). Historically, the word was also applied to Indian domestic cattle, the zebu (B. indicus or B. primigenius indicus). Because of the scarcity of the European bison, the word 'bison' was most familiar in relation to the American species.

By the time of the adoption of 'bison' into Early Modern English, the early medieval English name for the species had long been obsolete: the Old English: wesend had descended from Proto-Germanic: *wisand, *wisund and was related to Old Norse: vísundr. The word 'wisent' was then borrowed in the 19th century from modern German: Wisent [ˈviːzɛnt], itself related to Old High German: wisunt, wisent, wisint, and to Middle High German: wisant, wisent, wisen, and ultimately, like the Old English name, from Proto-Germanic.

The word 'zubr' in English is a borrowing from Polish: żubr [ʐubr], previously also used to denote one race of the European bison. The Polish żubr is similar to the word for the European bison in other modern Slavic languages, such as žubr in Upper Sorbian; зубр, zubr or бізон, bizon in Ukrainian; зубр, zubr (or зубар, zubar) or бізон, bizon in Belarusian; and зубр, zubr in Russian. The noun for the European bison in all living Slavonic tongues is thought to be derived from Proto-Slavic: *zǫbrъ ~ *izǫbrъ, which itself possibly comes from Proto-Indo-European: *ǵómbʰ- for tooth, horn or peg. In the Baltic countries of Lithuania and Latvia, where some bison populations persist as well, the animal is known as stumbras (plural: stumbrai) in Lithuanian and sumbrs (plural: sumbri) in Latvian, respectively.

== Description ==
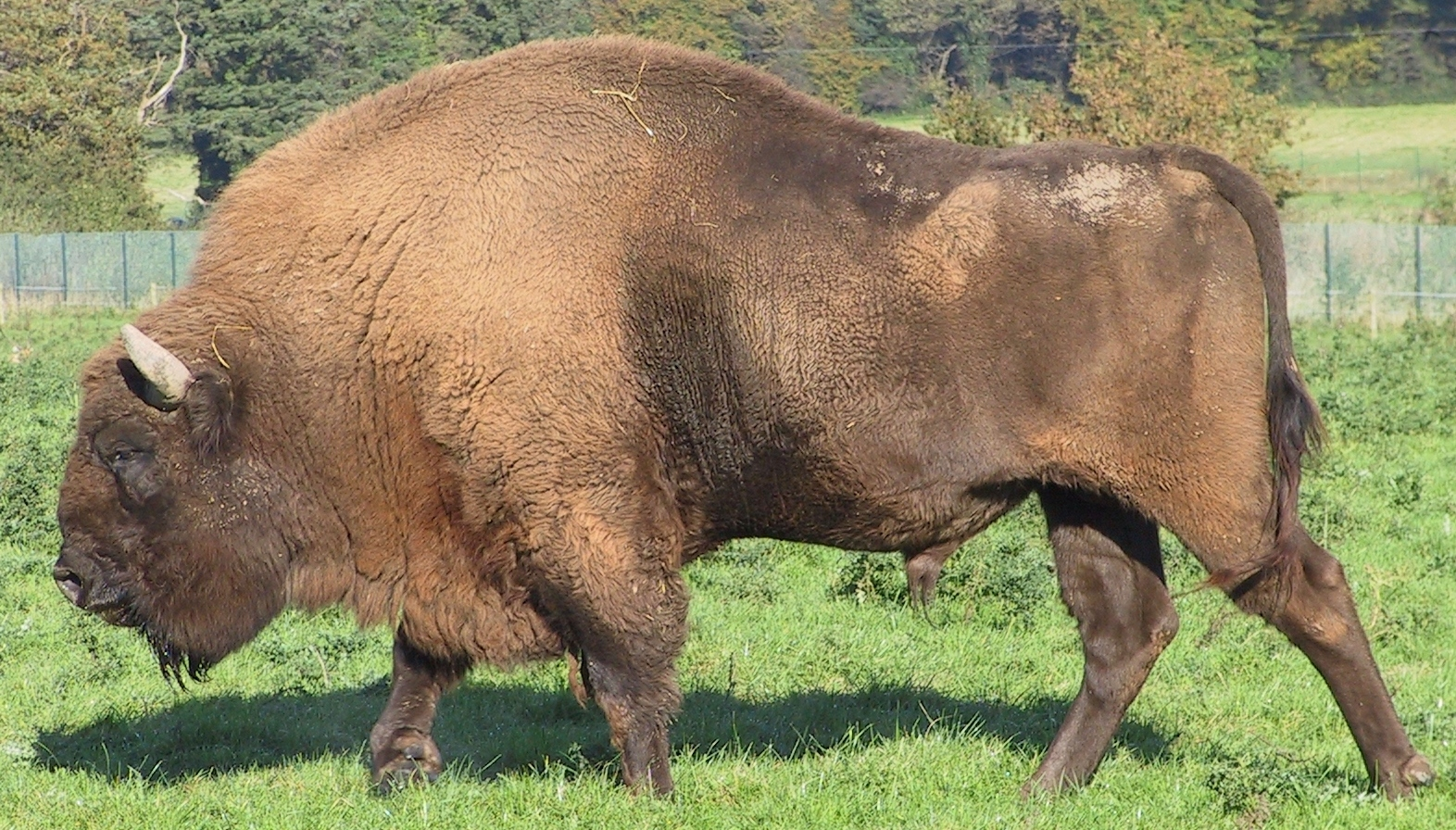
Side view of a European bison bull

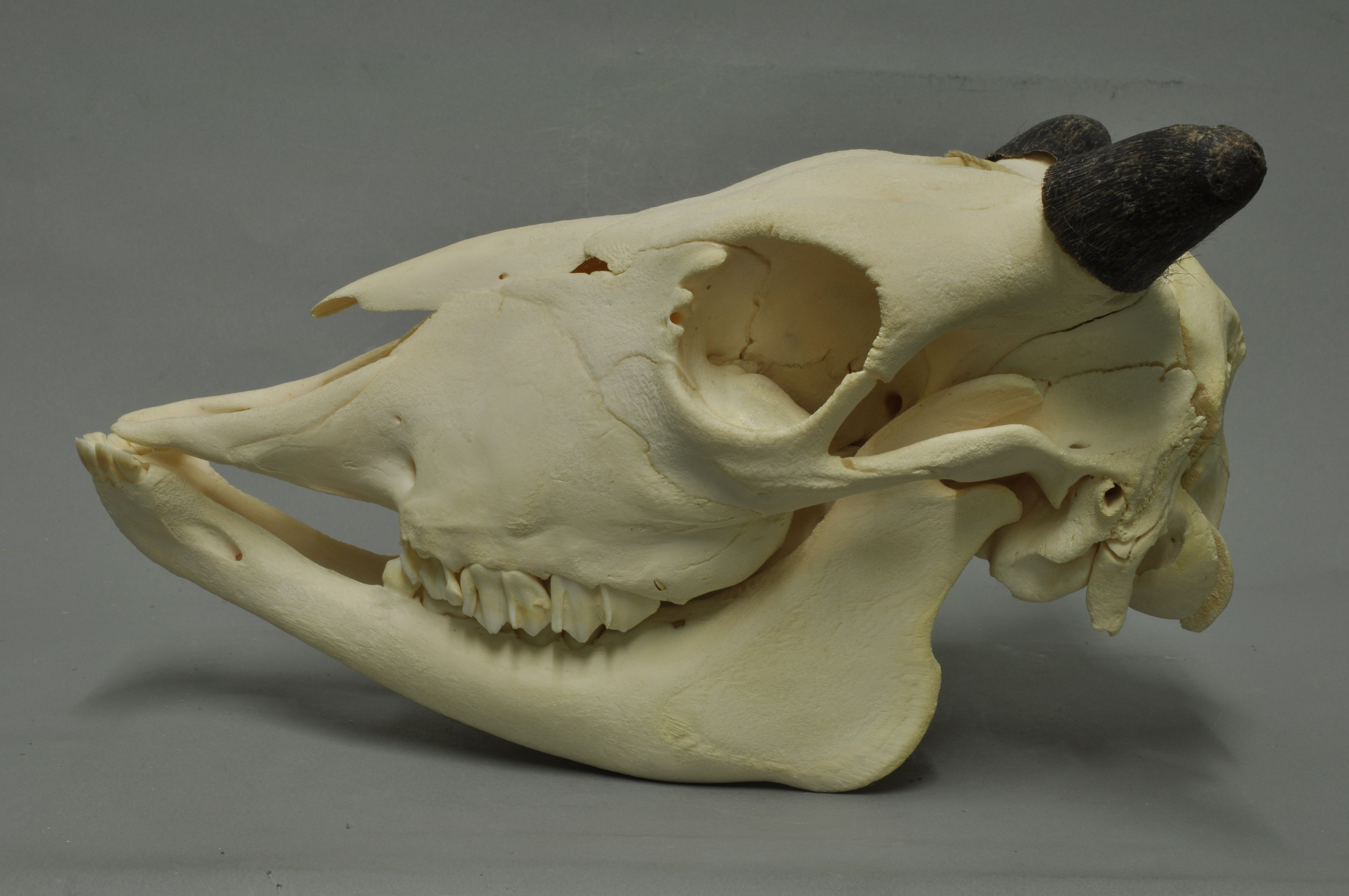
Skull of a European bison

Bison bull showing tongue colouration

The European bison is the heaviest surviving wild land animal in Europe. Similar to their American cousins, European bison were potentially larger historically than remnant descendants; modern animals are about 2.8 to 3.3 m (9.2 to 10.8 ft) in length, not counting a tail of 30 to 92 cm (12 to 36 in), 1.8 to 2.1 m (5.9 to 6.9 ft) in height, and 615 to 920 kg (1,356 to 2,028 lb) in weight for males, and about 2.4 to 2.9 m (7.9 to 9.5 ft) in body length without tails, 1.69 to 1.97 m (5.5 to 6.5 ft) in height, and 424 to 633 kg (935 to 1,396 lb) in weight for females. At birth, calves are quite small, weighing between 15 and 35 kg (33 and 77 lb). In the free-ranging population of the Białowieża Forest of Belarus and Poland, body masses among adults (aged 6 and over) are 634 kg (1,398 lb) on average in the cases of males, and 424 kg (935 lb) among females. An occasional big bull European bison can weigh up to 1,000 kg (2,200 lb) or more with old bull records of 1,900 kg (4,200 lb) for lowland wisent and 1,000 kg (2,200 lb) for Caucasian wisent.

On average, it is lighter in body mass, and yet slightly taller at the shoulder, than its American relatives, the wood bison (Bison bison athabascae) and the plains bison (Bison bison bison). Compared to the American species, the wisent has shorter hair on the neck, head, and forequarters, but longer tail and horns. See differences from American bison.

The European bison makes a variety of vocalisations depending on its mood and behaviour, but when anxious, it emits a growl-like sound, known in Polish as chruczenie ([xrutʂɛɲɛ]). This sound can also be heard from wisent males during the mating season.

== History ==
=== Prehistory ===
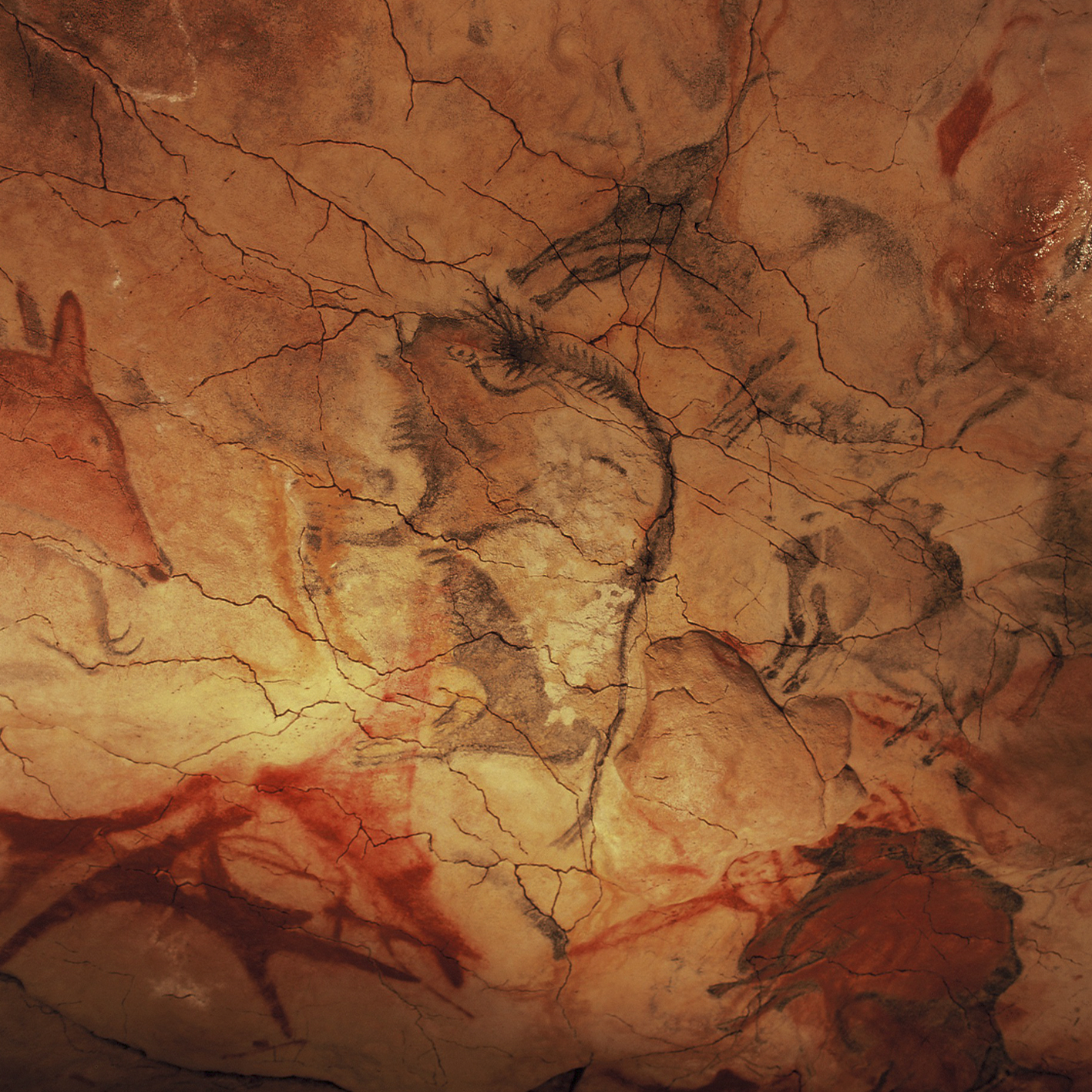
Bison depicted at cave of Altamira

The similar skeletal morphology of the wisent with the steppe bison (Bison priscus) which also formerly inhabited Europe complicates the understanding of the early evolution of the European bison. It is thought that European bison genetically diverged from steppe bison (as well as modern American bison, which are descended from steppe bison) at least 100,000 years ago. While nuclear DNA indicates that the two living bison species are each other's closest living relatives, the mitochondrial DNA of European bison is more closely related to that of aurochs and their domestic cattle descendants, which is suggested to be the result of either incomplete lineage sorting or ancient introgression, as result of interbreeding.

Genetic evidence indicates that European bison were present across Europe, from Spain (where a sedimentary ancient DNA record is known from El Miron Cave in Cantabria^{supplemental material}) to the Caucasus during the Last Glacial Period, where they co-existed alongside steppe bison. Cave paintings appear to distinguish between B. bonasus and B. priscus. Late Pleistocene European bison belong to two mitochondrial genome lineages (which a 2025 study estimated split from each other around 100,000 years ago), Bb1 (also known as Bison X, and sometimes controversially attributed to the species Bison schoetensacki, which is otherwise known from remains hundreds of thousands of years older) and Bb2. Bb1 has been found across Europe spanning from France to the Caucasus, while Bb2 was originally only found in the Caucasus, before expanding westwards at least by 22-21,000 years ago. At the end of the Last Glacial Period steppe bison became extinct in Europe, leaving European bison as the only bison species in the region. The Bb1 lineage became extinct at the beginning of the Holocene, with its youngest records dating to around 9900 years Before Present in southern Scandinavia, with all modern European bison belonging to the Bb2 lineage.

While some studies have estimated that modern European bison derive 10% of their ancestry from aurochs via interspecies gene flow, other authors have considered this a gross overestimate and based on flawed data, and not supported by the data from the full nuclear genome of the wisent, and that the actual contribution from aurochs/cattle around 2.4-3.2%, which is suggested to have occurred in the last 70,000 years.

Historically, the lowland European bison's range encompassed most of the lowlands of northern Europe, extending from the Massif Central to the Volga River and the Caucasus. It may have once lived in the Asiatic part of what is now the Russian Federation, reaching to Lake Baikal and Altai Mountains in east. The European bison is known in southern Sweden only between 9500 and 8700 BP, and in Denmark similarly is documented only from the Pre-Boreal. It is not conclusively recorded from the British Isles, nor from Italy or the Iberian Peninsula during the Holocene. However, in early 2026 a discovery of a skeleton belonging to the genus Bison was reported from the Sima de Arrafela cave in Navarre, Spain. The skeleton is estimated to be c. 4,000 years old, dating to the Chalcolithic period, though its exact identity is uncertain pending genetic analysis.

=== Antiquity and Middle Ages ===
Within mainland Europe, its range decreased as human populations expanded and cut down forests. They seemed to be common in Aristotle's period on Mount Mesapion (possibly the modern Ograzhden). In the same wider area Pausanias calling them Paeonian bulls and bison, gives details on how they were captured alive; adding also the fact that a golden Paeonian bull head was offered to Delphi by the Paeonian king Dropion (3rd century BC) who lived in what is today Tikveš. The last references (Oppian, Claudius Aelianus) to the animal in the transitional Mediterranean/Continental biogeographical region in the Balkans in the area of modern borderline between Greece, North Macedonia and Bulgaria date to the 3rd century AD. In northern Bulgaria, the wisent was thought to have survived until the 9th or 10th century AD, but more recent data summary shows that the species survived up to 13th - 14th century AD in eastern Bulgaria and up to 16th - 17th century AD in the northern part of the country. There is a possibility that the species' range extended to East Thrace during the 7th–8th century AD. Its population in Gaul was extinct in the 8th century AD. The species survived in the Ardennes and the Vosges Mountains until the 15th century. In the Early Middle Ages, the wisent apparently still occurred in the forest steppes east of the Urals, in the Altai Mountains, and seems to have reached Lake Baikal in the east. The northern boundary in the Holocene was probably around 60°N in Finland. European bison survived in a few natural forests in Europe, but their numbers dwindled.

=== Early Modern period ===
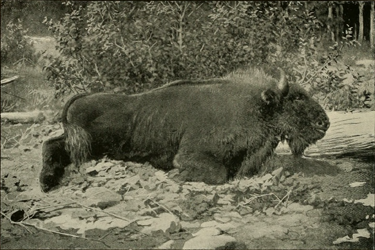
A specimen of the now-extinct Caucasian subspecies, 1889

In 1513 the Białowieża Forest, at this point one of the last areas on Earth where the European bison still roamed free, was transferred from the Troki Voivodeship of Lithuania to the Podlaskie Voivodeship, which after the Union of Lublin became part of the Polish Crown. In the Polish–Lithuanian Commonwealth, at first European bison in the Białowieża Forest were legally the property of the Grand Dukes of Lithuania and later belonged to the Crown of the Kingdom of Poland. Polish-Lithuanian rulers took measures to protect the European bison, such as King Sigismund II Augustus who instituted the death penalty for poaching bison in Białowieża in the mid-16th century. Wild European bison herds existed in the forest until the mid-17th century. In 1701, King Augustus II the Strong greatly increased protection over the forest; the first written sources mentioning the use of some forest meadows for the production of winter fodder for the bison come from this period. In the early 19th century, after the partitions of the Polish Commonwealth, the Russian tsars retained old Polish-Lithuanian laws protecting the European bison herd in Białowieża. Despite these measures and others, the European bison population continued to decline over the following century, with only Białowieża and Northern Caucasus populations surviving into the 20th century. The last European bison in Transylvania died in 1790.

=== Early 20th century ===
During World War I, occupying German troops killed 600 of the European bison in the Białowieża Forest for sport, meat, hides and horns. A German scientist informed army officers that the European bison were facing imminent extinction, but at the very end of the war, retreating German soldiers shot all but nine animals. The last wild European bison in Poland was killed in 1921. The last wild European bison in the world was killed by poachers in 1927 in the western Caucasus. By that year, 48 remained, all held by zoos. The International Society for the Preservation of the Wisent was founded on 25 and 26 August 1923 in Berlin, following the example of the American Bison Society. The first chairman was Kurt Priemel, director of the Frankfurt Zoo, and among the members were experts like Hermann Pohle, Max Hilzheimer and Julius Riemer. The first goal of the society was to take stock of all living bison, in preparation for a breeding programme. Important members were the Polish Hunting Association and the Poznań zoological gardens, as well as a number of Polish private individuals, who provided funds to acquire the first bison cows and bulls. The breeding book was published in the company's annual report from 1932. While Priemel aimed to grow the population slowly with pure conservation of the breeding line, Lutz Heck planned to grow the population faster by cross-breeding with American bison in a separate breeding project in Munich, in 1934.

=== World War II ===
Heck gained the support of then Reichsjägermeister Hermann Göring, who hoped for huntable big game. Heck promised his powerful supporter in writing: "Since surplus bulls will soon be set, the hunting of the Wisent will be possible again in the foreseeable future". Göring himself took over the patronage of the German Professional Association of Wisent Breeders and Hegers, founded at Heck's suggestion. Kurt Priemel, who had since resigned as president of the International Society for the Preservation of the Wisent, warned in vain against "manification". Heck answered by announcing that Göring would take action against Priemel if he continued to oppose his crossing plans. Priemel was then banned from publishing in relation to bison breeding, and the regular bookkeeper of the International Society, Erna Mohr, was forced to hand over the official register in 1937. Thus, the older society was effectively incorporated into the newly created Professional Association. After the Second World War, therefore, only the pure-blooded bison in the game park Springe near Hanover were recognised as part of the international herd book.

=== 1950s onwards ===
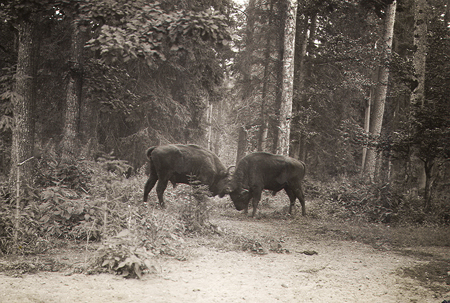
Białowieża Forest, 1955

The first two bison were released into the wild in the Białowieża Forest in 1929. By 1964 more than 100 existed. Over the following decades, thanks to Polish and international efforts, the Białowieża Forest regained its position as the location with the world's largest population of European bison, including those in the wild. In 2005–2007, a wild bison nicknamed Pubal became renowned in southeast Poland due to his friendly interactions with humans and unwillingness to reintegrate into the wild. As of 2014 there were 1,434 wisents in Poland, out of which 1,212 were in free-range herds and 522 belonged to the wild population in the Białowieża Forest. Compared to 2013, the total population in 2014 increased by 4.1%, while the free-ranging population increased by 6.5%. Bison from Poland have also been transported beyond the country's borders to boost the local populations of other countries, among them Bulgaria, Spain, Romania, Czechia and others. Poland has been described as the world's breeding centre of the European bison, where the bison population doubled between 1995 and 2017, reaching 2,269 by the end of 2019 – the total population has been increasing by around 15% to 18% yearly. In July 2022 a small population was released into woodland by Canterbury in Kent to trial their reintroduction into the UK. In May 2024, a small population was released in central Portugal. In 2012 bisons were released in protected areas on Bornholm and northern Jutland, Denmark; the latter population was relocated to Lille Vildmose in 2019.

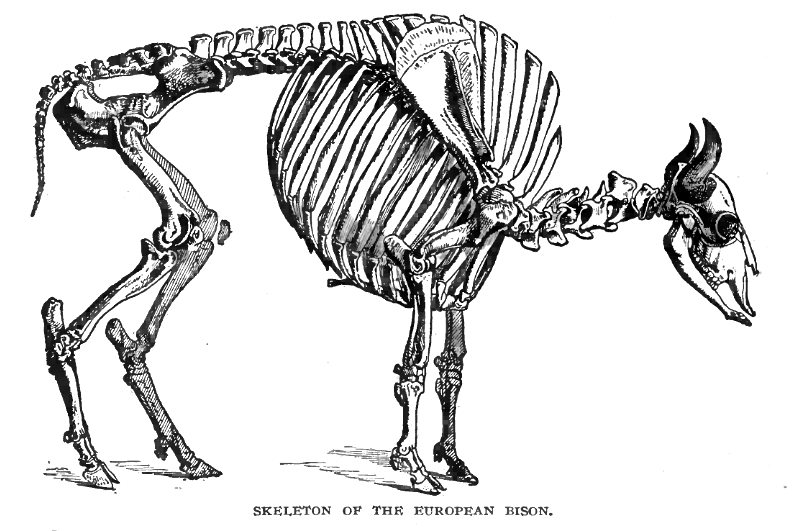
European bison's skeleton

== Behaviour and biology ==
=== Social structure and territorial behaviours ===
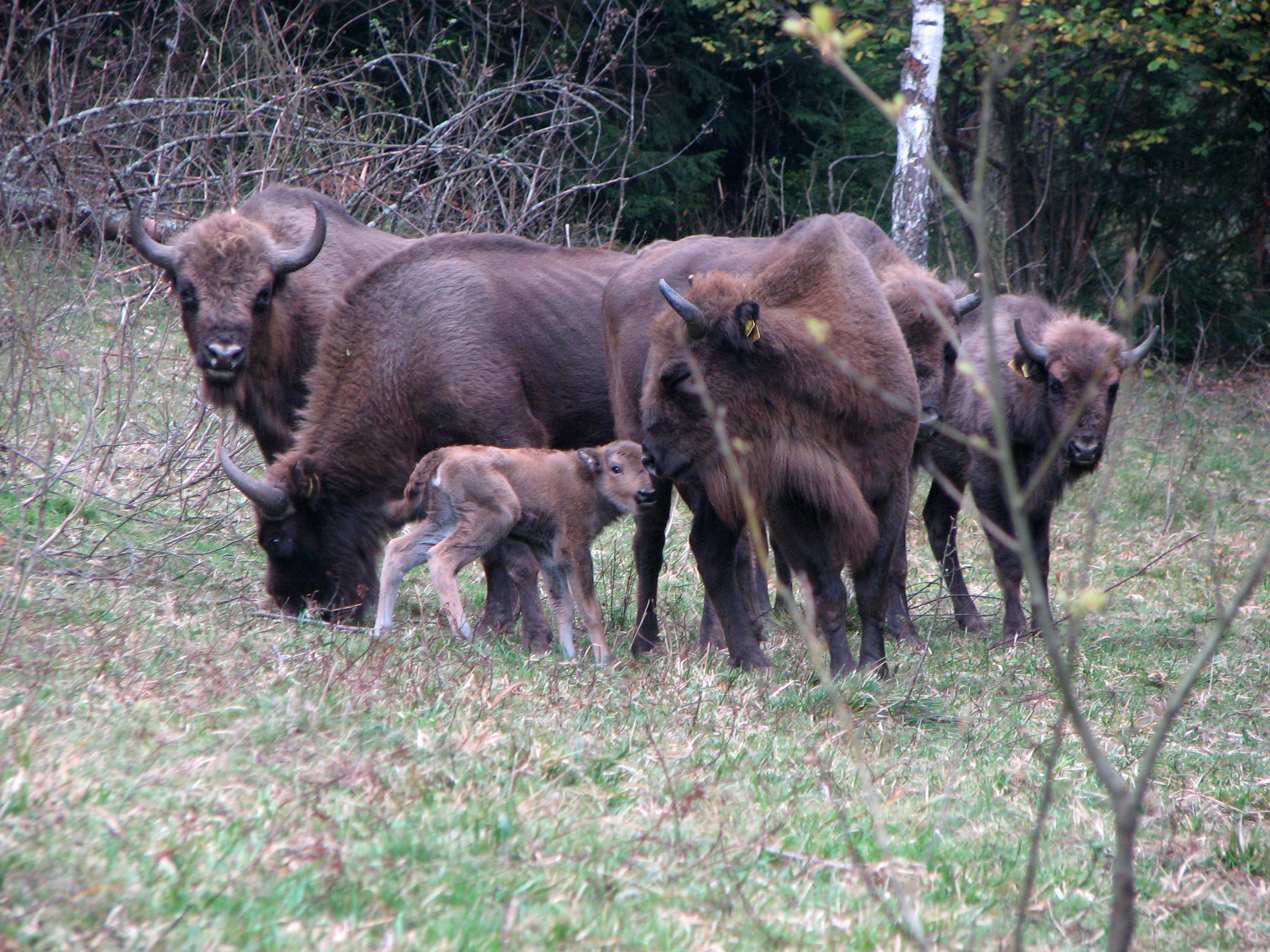
Adult females with calves

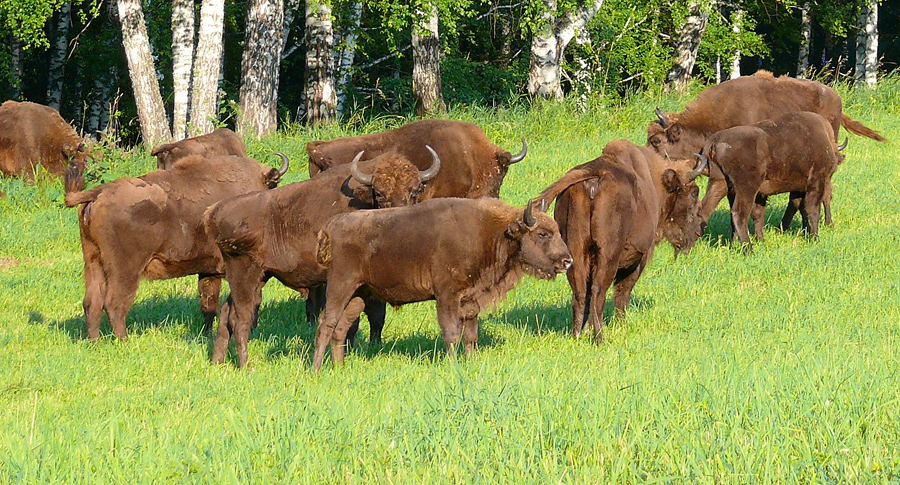
Bison usually live in small herds of about 10 animals; the image shows a herd in a nursery in the Altai Mountains.

The European bison is a herd animal, which lives in both mixed and solely male groups. Mixed groups consist of adult females, calves, young aged 2–3 years, and young adult bulls. The average herd size is dependent on environmental factors, though on average, they number eight to 13 animals per herd. Herds consisting solely of bulls are smaller than mixed ones, containing two individuals on average. European bison herds are not family units. Different herds frequently interact, combine, and quickly split after exchanging individuals.

Bison social structure has been described by specialists as a matriarchy, as it is the cows of the herd that lead it, and decide where the entire group moves to graze. Although larger and heavier than the females, the oldest and most powerful male bulls are usually satellites that hang around the edges of the herd to protect the group. Bulls begin to serve a more active role in the herd when a danger to the group's safety appears, as well as during the mating season – when they compete with each other.

Territory held by bulls is correlated by age, with young bulls aged between five and six tending to form larger home ranges than older males. The European bison does not defend territory, and herd ranges tend to greatly overlap. Core areas of territory are usually sited near meadows and water sources.

=== Reproduction ===
The rutting season occurs from August through to October. Bulls aged 4–6 years, though sexually mature, are prevented from mating by older bulls. Cows usually have a gestation period of 264 days, and typically give birth to one calf at a time.

On average, male calves weigh 27.6 kg (60.8 lb) at birth, and females 24.4 kg (53.8 lb). Body size in males increases proportionately to the age of 6 years. While females have a higher increase in body mass in their first year, their growth rate is comparatively slower than that of males by the age of 3–5. Bulls reach sexual maturity at the age of two, while cows do so in their third year.

European bison have lived as long as 30 years in captivity, but in the wild their lifespan is usually between 18 and 24 years, with females living longer than males. Productive breeding years are between four and 20 years of age in females, and only between six and 12 years of age in males.

=== Diet ===
European bison feed predominantly on grasses, sedges, and herbs, although they also browse on shoots, twigs, bark, and leaves from trees and shrubs; in summer, an adult male can consume 32 kg of food in a day. Mosses, horsetails, ferns, and fungi combined account for 0.1 to 0.7% of the rumen capacity, depending on the season. European bison in the Białowieża Forest in Poland have traditionally been fed hay in the winter for centuries, and large herds may gather around this diet supplement. European bison need to drink every day, and in winter can be seen breaking ice with their heavy hooves.

=== Differences from American bison ===
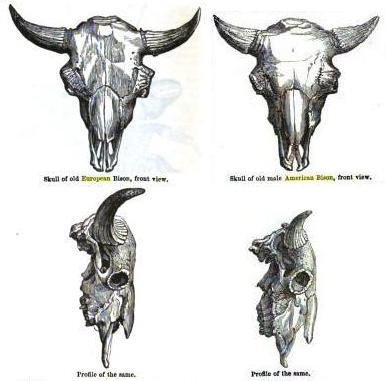
Skulls of European bison (left) and American bison (right)

Although superficially similar, a number of physical and behavioural differences are seen between the European bison and the American bison. The European bison has 14 pairs of ribs, while the American bison has 15.

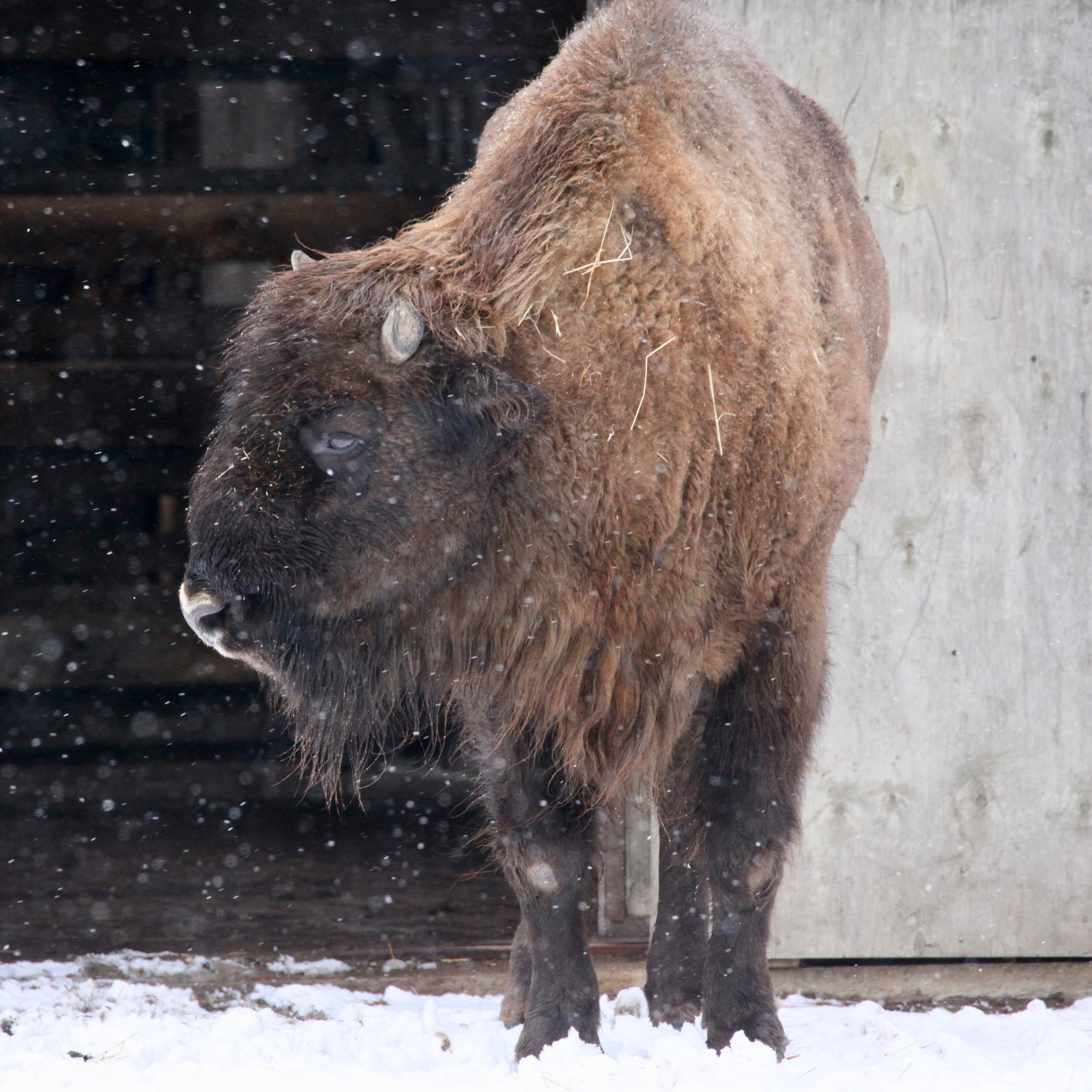
European bison has a lankier body than the American bison (Tallinn Zoo, Estonia, 2023 March)

Adult European bison are (on average) taller than American bison, and have longer legs. European bison tend to browse more, and graze less than their American relatives; to accommodate this their necks are set differently. Compared to the American bison, the nose of the European bison is set further forward than the forehead when the neck is in a neutral position.

The body of the wisent is less hairy, though its tail is hairier than that of the American species. The horns of the European bison point forward through the plane of their faces, making them more adept at fighting through the interlocking of horns in the same manner as domestic cattle, unlike the American bison, which favours charging. European bison are less tameable than the American ones, and breed with domestic cattle less readily.

The European bison is less shaggy, with a more lanky body shape.

In terms of behavioural capability, European bison runs slower and with less stamina yet jumps higher and longer than American bisons, showing signs of more developed adaptations into mountainous habitats.

== Conservation ==
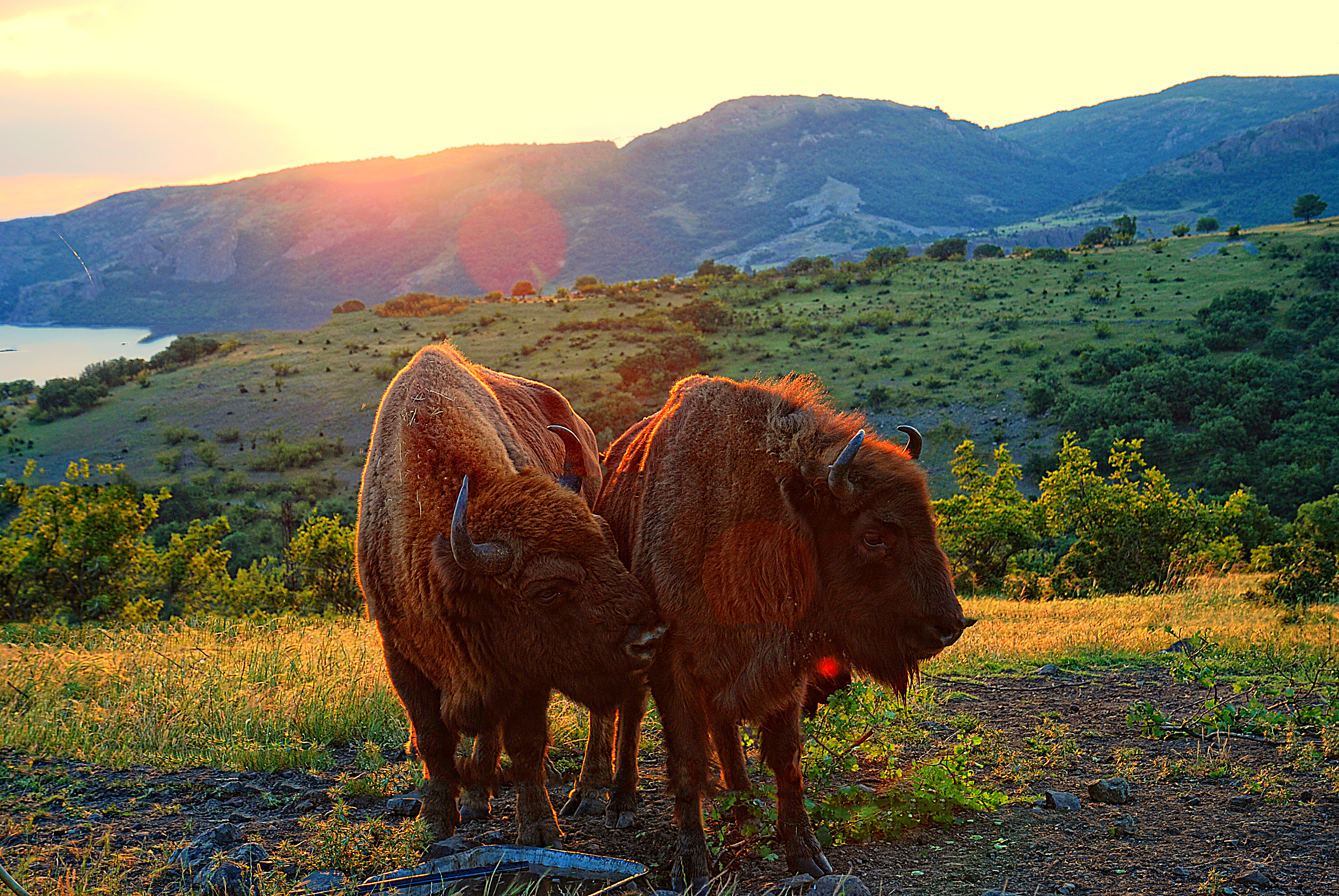
Valchi Dol reserve in Bulgaria

The protection of the European bison has a long history; between the 15th and 18th centuries, those in the forest of Białowieża were protected and their diet supplemented. Efforts to restore this species to the wild began in 1929, with the establishment of the Bison Restitution Centre at Białowieża, Poland. Subsequently, in 1948, the Bison Breeding Centre was established within the Prioksko-Terrasny Biosphere Reserve.

The modern herds are managed as two separate lines – one consisting of only Bison bonasus bonasus (all descended from only seven animals) and one consisting of all 12 ancestors, including the one B. b. caucasicus bull. The latter is generally not considered a separate subspecies because they contain DNA from both B. b. bonasus and B. b. caucasicius, although some scientists classify them as a new subspecies, B. b. montanus. Only a limited amount of inbreeding depression from the population bottleneck has been found, having a small effect on skeletal growth in cows and a small rise in calf mortality. Genetic variability continues to shrink. From five initial bulls, all current European bison bulls have one of only two remaining Y chromosomes.

=== Reintroduction ===
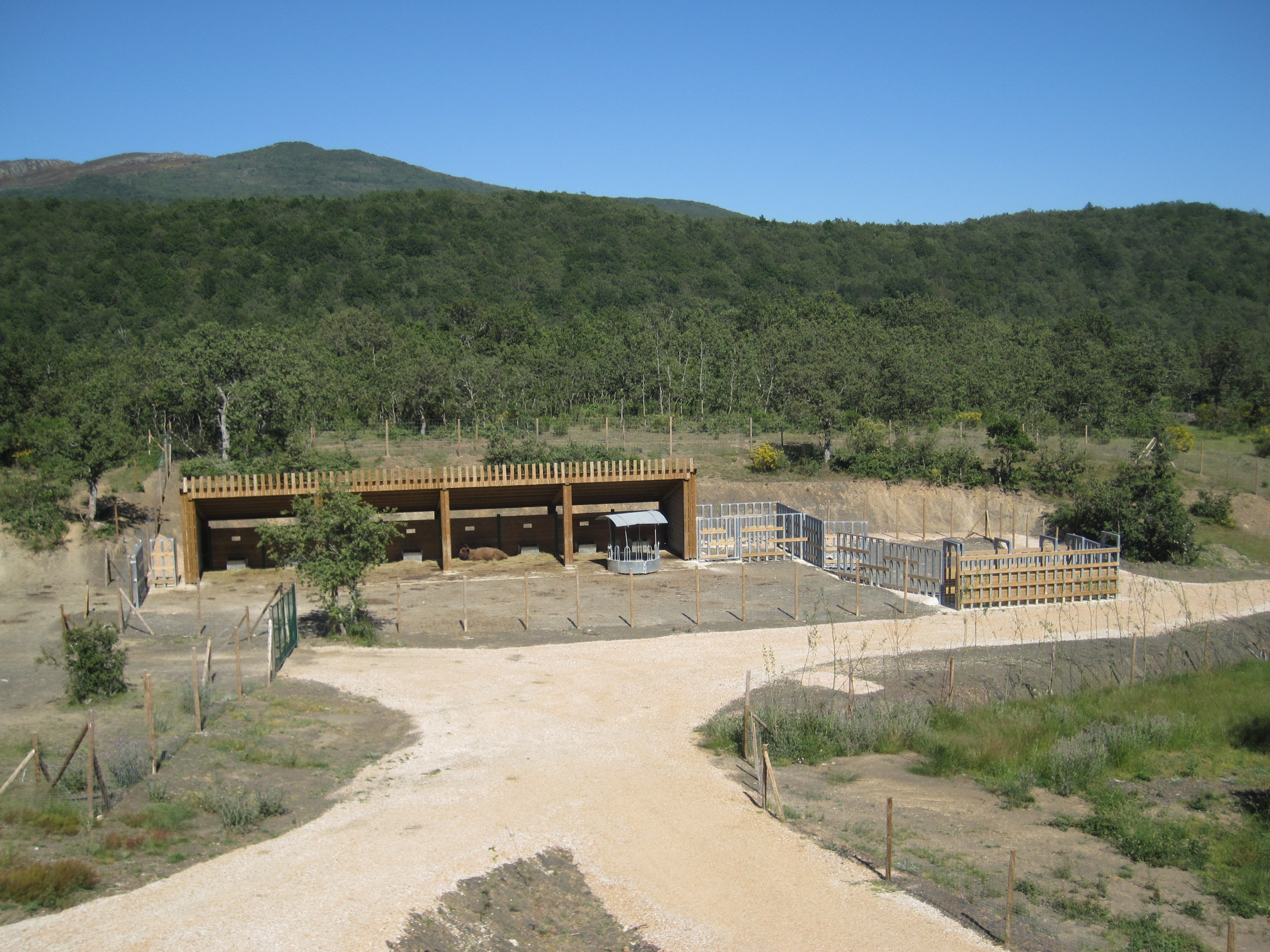
European bison reserve in Spain, where a reintroduction programme in San Cebrián de Mudá, Castile and León is in place.

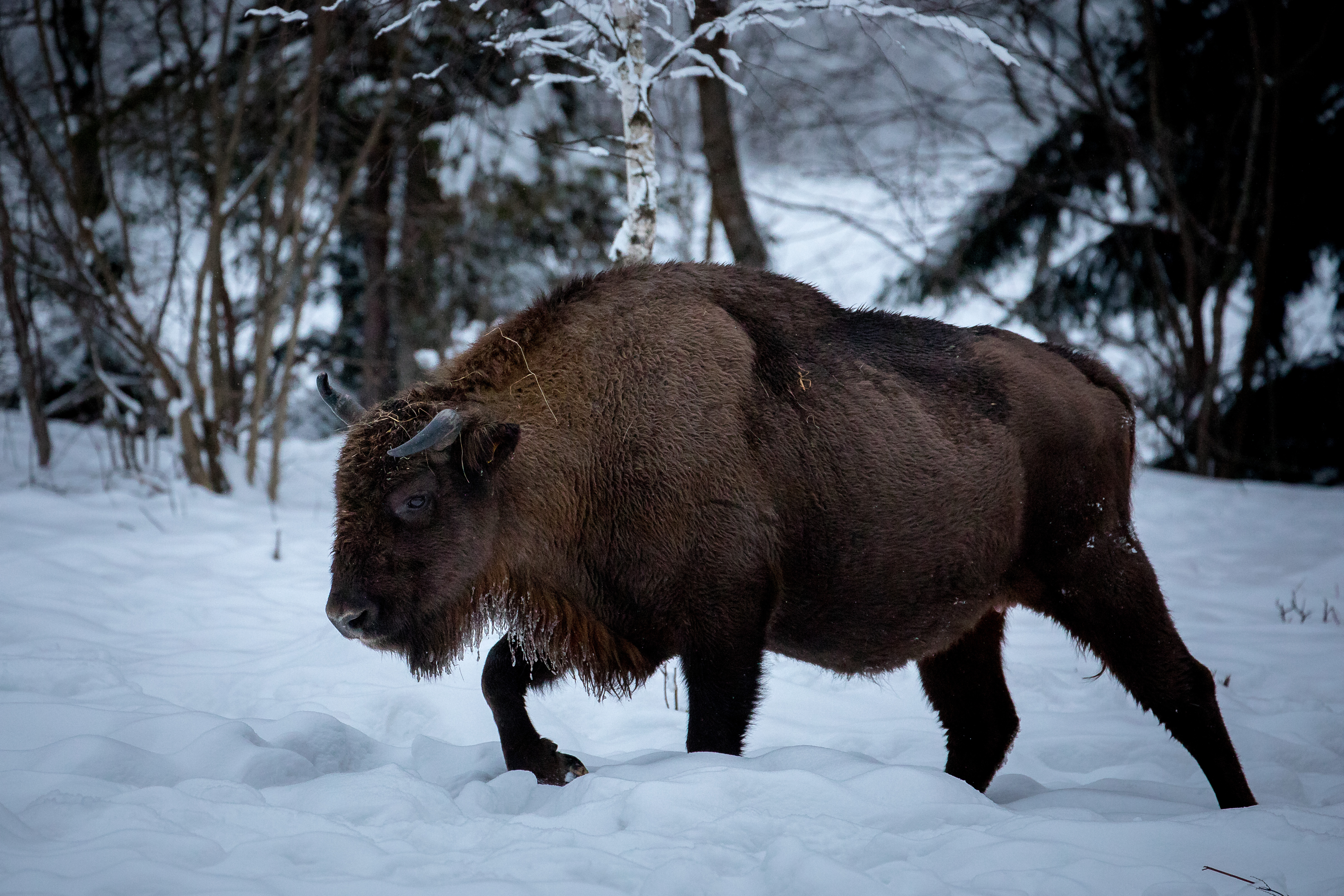
Bison in Skole Beskids National Nature Park, Stryi Raion in Ukraine

Beginning in 1951, European bison have been reintroduced into the wild, including some areas where they were never found wild. Free-ranging herds are currently found in Poland, Lithuania, Belarus, Ukraine, Bulgaria, Romania, Russia, Slovakia, Latvia, Switzerland, Kyrgyzstan, Germany, and in forest preserves in the Western Caucasus. The Białowieża Primeval Forest, an ancient woodland that straddles the border between Poland and Belarus, continues to have the largest free-living European bison population in the world with around 1000 wild bison counted in 2014. Herds have also been introduced in Moldova (2005), Spain (2010), Denmark (2012), the Czech Republic (2014), and Portugal (2024).

Reintroduction of bison to a 52 square km grasslands area in the Țarcu Mountains of Romania in 2014 was found to have resulted in an additional 54,000 tons of carbon draw-down annually.

The Wilder Blean project, headed up by the Wildwood Trust and Kent Wildlife Trust, introduced European bison to the UK for the first time in 6000 years (although there was an unsuccessful attempt in Scotland in 2011, and the European bison is not confirmed to be native to England while the British Isles once used to be inhabited by now-extinct Steppe bison and Pleistocene woodland bison). The herd of 3 females, with plans to also release a male in the following months, was set free in July 2022 within a 2,500-acre (10 square km) conservation area in West Blean and Thornden Woods, near Canterbury. Unknown to the rangers, one of the females was pregnant and gave birth to a calf in October 2022, marking the first wild bison born in the UK for the first time in millennia. In winter 2023, the matriarch of the herd gave birth to a male calf. A further two female calves were born at the site in October 2024. In January 2025, the project was recognised as one of The Big Issue's top Changemakers of 2025.

As below-mentioned, there are established herds in Spain, Portugal and Italy, however European bison has not been recorded naturally from the Italian Peninsulas, while these regions were once inhabited by Pleistocene woodland bison and Steppe bison. The introduction of European bison into Spain has drawn opposition from ecologists and wildlife biologists who argue that Bison bonasus never lived on the Iberian peninsula and that the climate is ill-suited to the species, particularly in light of global warming.

=== Numbers and distribution ===
==== Numbers by country ====
The total worldwide population recorded in 2019 was around 7,500 – about half of this number being in Poland and Belarus, with over 25% of the global population located in Poland alone. For 2016, the number was 6,573 (including 4,472 free-ranging) and has been increasing. Some local populations are estimated as:

- Austria: 10 animals
- Azerbaijan: 29 animals in 2021.
- Belarus: 2,385 animals in 2023.
- Bulgaria: Around 150 animals in northeastern Bulgaria; a smaller population has been reintroduced in the eastern Rhodope Mountains.
- Czech Republic: 106 animals in 2017.
- Denmark: Two herds were established in the summer of 2012, as part of conservation of the species. First, fourteen animals were released in meadows near the town of Randers, and later, seven animals on Bornholm. In June 2012, one male and six females were moved from Poland to the Danish island Bornholm. The plan was to examine if it is possible to establish a wild population of bison on the island over a five-year period. In 2018, it was decided to keep the bison on Bornholm, but maintained within the large fenced-in part of the Almindingen forest where originally introduced. In 2019, the bison that initially had been introduced near Randers were moved to the more suitable and spacious Lille Vildmose; these were supplemented by seven animals from the Netherlands in 2021.
- France: One herd was established in 2005 in the Alps near the village of Thorenc (close to the city of Grasse), as part of conservation of the species. In 2015, it contained around 50 animals.
- Germany: A herd of 8 animals (1 male, 5 females, and 2 calves) was released into nature in April 2013 at the Rothaarsteig natural reserve near Bad Berleburg (North Rhine-Westphalia) after 850 years of absence since the species became extinct in that region. As of May 2015, 13 free-roaming wisents lived there. In September 2017 one of the free-living Polish animals swam the border river Oder and migrated to Germany. It was the first wild bison seen in Germany for more than 250 years. German authorities ordered the animal to be killed and it was shot dead by hunters in September 2017. As of 2020, the population has steadily increased to 26 individuals, living in one subpopulation.
- Hungary: 11 animals in the Őrség National Park and few more in the Körös-Maros National Park.
- Italy: A small herd can be found in the Natura Viva Park near Verona, Italy, where the animals are protected and are prepared to be put in nature again in the wild areas of Romania.
- Kyrgyzstan: Animals were reintroduced at one point.
- Latvia: Animals were reintroduced in Pape Nature Reserve in 2007.
- Lithuania: 214 free-ranging animals as of 2017.
- Moldova: Extirpated from Moldova since the 18th century, wisents were reintroduced with the arrival of three European bison from Białowieża Forest in Poland several days before Moldova's Independence Day on 27 August 2005. Moldova is currently interested in expanding their wisent population, and began talks with Belarus in 2019 regarding a bison exchange program between the two countries. Bisons can be found in Pădurea Domnească.

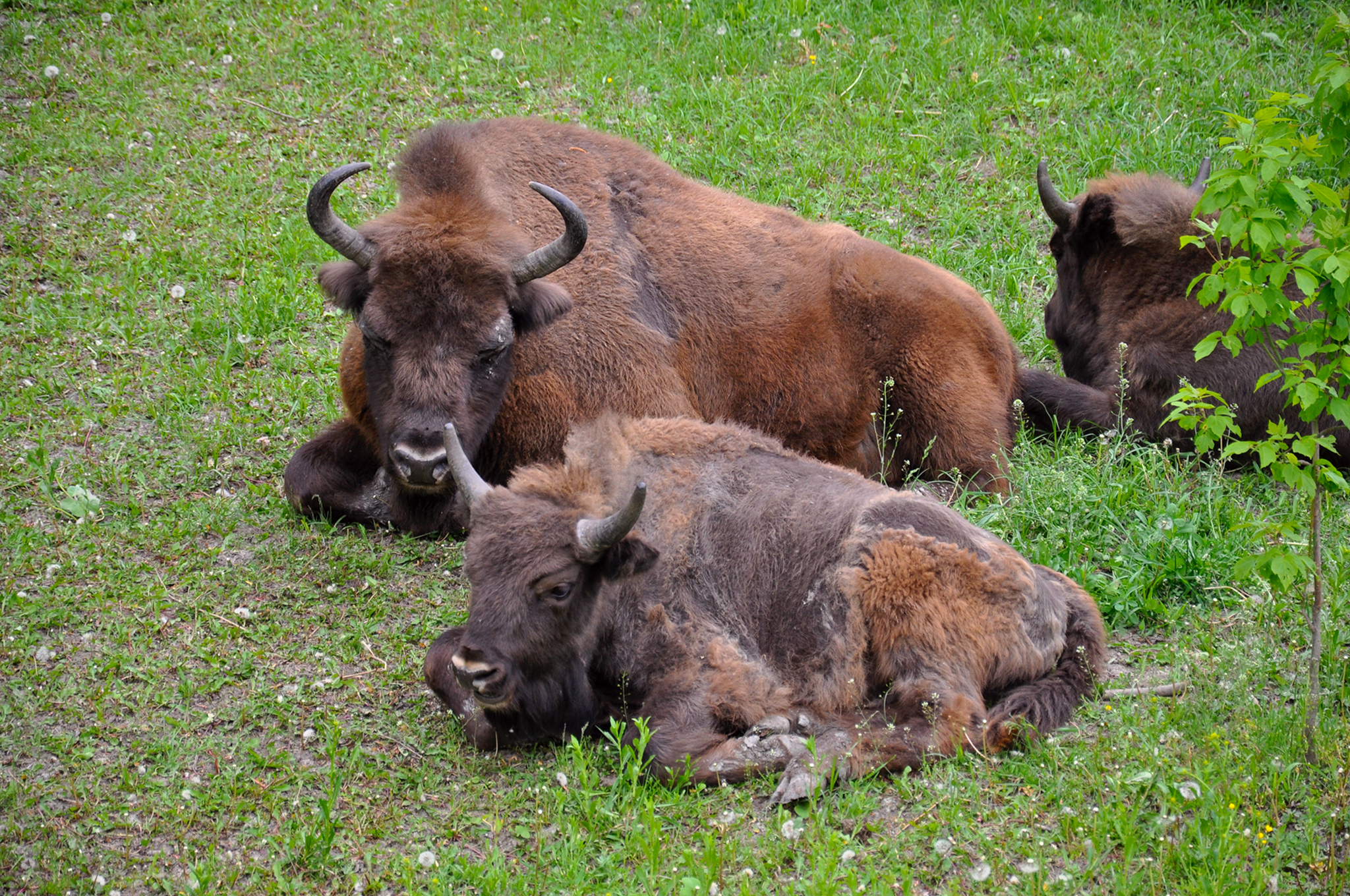
Bisons in Pădurea Domnească, Moldova

- Netherlands: Natuurpark Lelystad: In 1976, the first wisent arrived from Białowieża. Natuurpark Lelystad is a breeding centre with a herd of approx. 25 animals living together with Przewalski's horses. All wisents are registered in the European Studbook and are of the Lowland line. It is one of the suppliers for re-introduction projects in Europe. Kraansvlak herd established in 2007 with three wisents, and expanded to six in 2008; the Maashorst herd established in 2016 with 11 wisents; and the Veluwe herd established in 2016 with a small herd. In 2020 a new herd of 14 bison was established in the Slikken van de Heen. Numbers at the end of 2017 were: Lelystad 24, Kraansvlak 22, Maashorst 15 and the Veluwe 5, for a total of 66 animals.
- Poland: As of May 15, 2025 the number reached 3060. out of which 2855 were free-roaming. Earlier years data showed that by the end of 2019 the number was 2,269, of which 2,048 were free-roaming and 221 were living in captivity, including zoos. A total of 770 belonged to the wild population in the Białowieża Forest and 668 to Bieszczady National Park. The total population has been increasing by around 15% to 18% yearly. Between 1995 and 2017 the number of bison in Poland doubled; from 2012 to 2017 it rose by 30%. Poland has been described as the world's breeding centre of the European bison. Zubr from Poland have also been transported beyond the country's borders to boost the local populations of other countries – among them Bulgaria, Czechia, Denmark, Moldova, Romania, Spain, Switzerland, and others. As the number of animals is growing, more bison are spotted in areas where they have not been seen in centuries, especially migrating males in Spring. The placement of about 40 free-roaming bison in the Lasy Janowskie in 2020/2021 resulted in ecologists' efforts to redesign some bridges of the S19 highway (constructed in 2020–2022) to allow large animals to cross it.
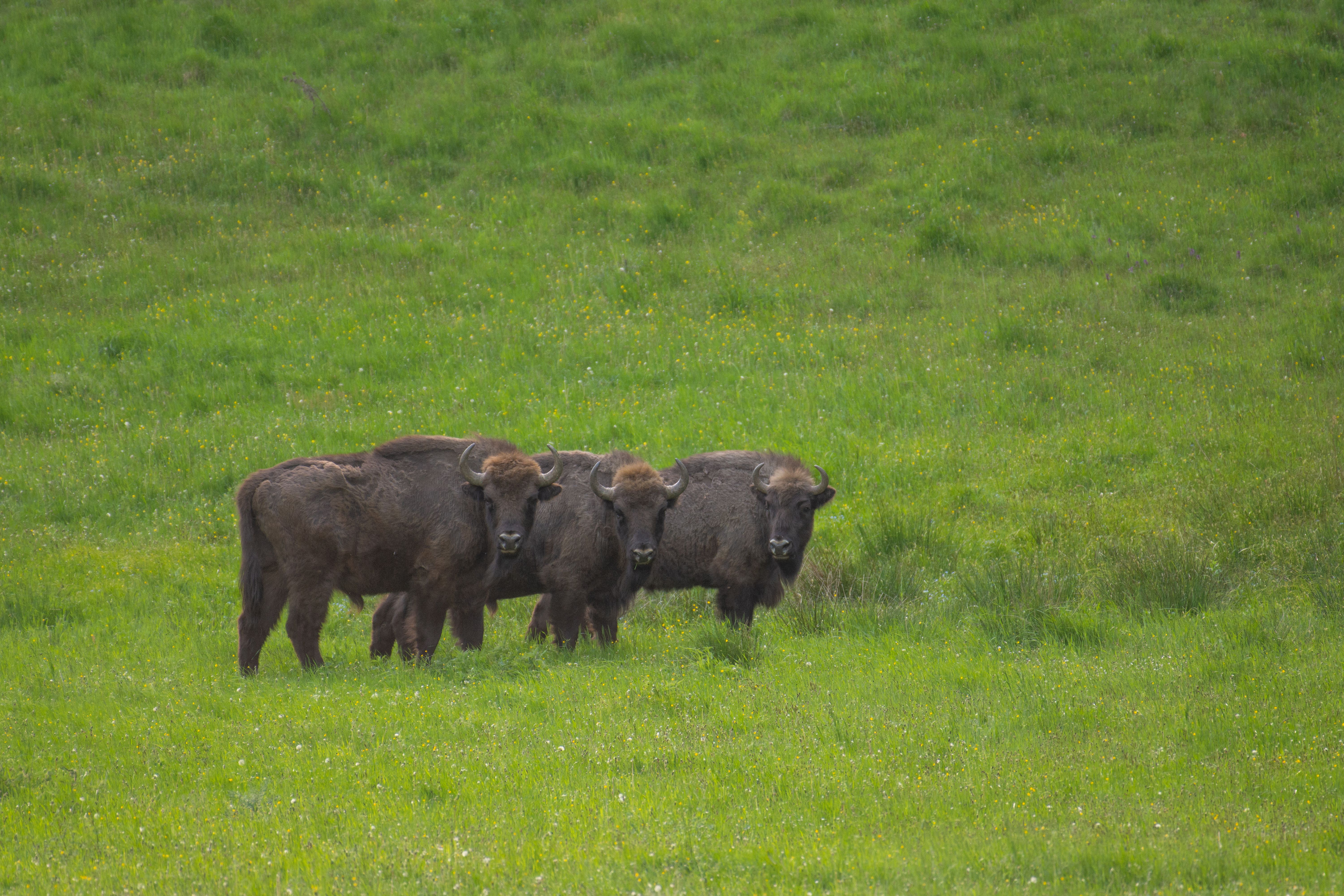
  European Bisons in Făgăraș Mountains, Foundation Conservation Carpathia project area, Romania
- Portugal: A herd of 8 bisons were introduced in central Portugal for the first time in 2024 in Termas de Monfortinho and Herdade do Vale Freitoso, through the "Rewilding Portugal" programme.
- Romania: The European bison were reintroduced in 1958, when the first two animals were brought from Poland and kept in a reserve in Hațeg. Similar locations later appeared in Vama Buzăului (Valea Zimbrilor Nature Reserve) and Bucșani, Dâmbovița. The idea of free bison, on the Romanian territory, was born in 1999, through a program supported by the World Bank and the European Union. Almost 160 free-roaming animals, as of 2019, population slowly increasing in the four areas where wild bison can be found: Northern Romania – Vânători-Neamț Natural Park, and South-West Romania – Țarcu Mountains and Poiana Ruscă Mountains, as part of the Life-Bison project initiated by WWF Romania and Rewilding Europe, with co-funding from the EU through its LIFE Programme, but also in the Southern Carpathians, in the Făgăraș Mountains, as part of the Foundation Conservation Carpathia project, carried out within the LIFE Carpathia project. Since 2019, Foundation Conservation Carpathia has started to reintroduce the European Bison in the Făgăraș Mountains, after more than 200 years since their disappearance from the central forests of Romania. Foundation Conservation Carpathia aims to reintroduce 75 European bisons into the Făgăraș Mountains. In June 2024, 14 additional bison were brought to the southern Carpathian mountains from Germany and Sweden.
- Russia: As of 2020, the population of Wisents in Russia has greatly recovered and stands at 1,588 individuals.
- Serbia: In March 2022, 5 animals (one bull and four cows) were reintroduced where bison went extinct c.1800. Animals were transported from the Białowieża Forest and reintroduced on the Fruška Gora mountain.
- Slovakia: A bison reserve was established in Topoľčianky in 1958. The reserve has a maximum capacity of 13 animals but has bred around 180 animals for various zoos. As of 2020, there was also a wild breeding herd of 48 animals in Poloniny National Park with an increasing population.
- Spain: Two herds in northern Spain were established in 2010. As of 2018, the total population neared a hundred animals, half of them in Castile and León, but also in Asturias, Valencia, Extremadura and the Pyrenees.
- Sweden: There are approximately 139 animals.
- Switzerland: More than 50 animals. Coming from Poland, one male and four females were introduced in November 2019 into the natural reserve and forest of Suchy, Vaud Canton, western Switzerland. On 15 June 2020, the first baby of that population was born. Besides the Suchy breeding station, several zoos in Switzerland are keeping bison too. From September 2022, at least five animals will be kept in semi-freedom in Welschenrohr, with hiking paths cutting through the enclosure.
- Ukraine: A population of around 400 animals, population was recently introduced to several national parks and is increasing. State program of conservation and reproduction was approved in 2022.
- United Kingdom: In 2011, 3 animals were introduced into Alladale Wilderness Reserve in Scotland. Plans to move more into the reserve were made, but the project failed due to not being "well thought through", and the project was terminated in 2013. 11 years later, 3 female bison were introduced to the West Blean and Thornden Woods in Kent, England on 18 July 2022. A calf, also female, was unexpectedly born in September 2022, bringing the total number to 4. On 24 December 2022 a bull was introduced after delays brought about by Brexit-related complications. This makes these 5 bison the first "complete" wild herd in the UK in thousands of years. The birth of a male calf in winter 2023 and two female calves in October 2024 increased the herd's numbers to 8 animals.
- Belgium: In 2027 Wisents will be Re-introduced in a 500 Hectare nature reserve in Bosland Belgium.

==== Distribution ====
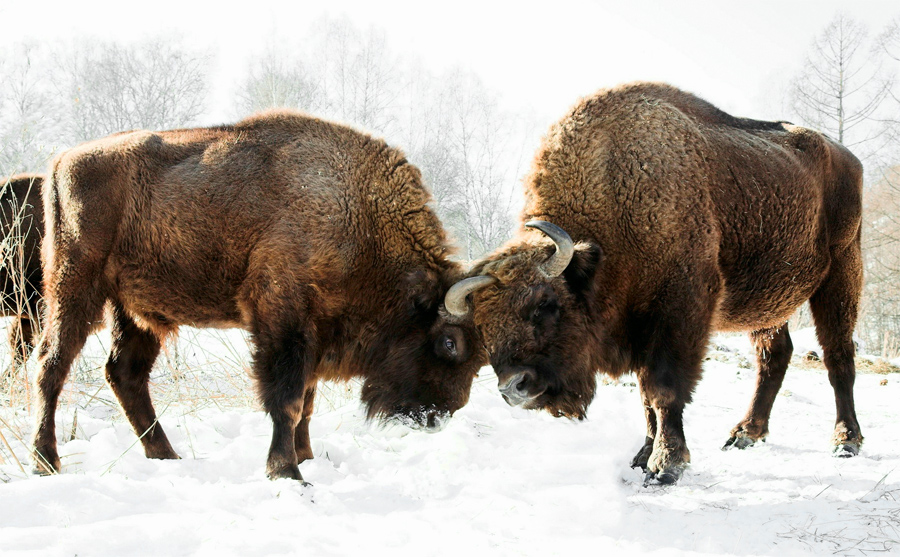
Bison sparring in the reserve in Altai Mountains, Russia

The largest European bison herds — of both captive and wild populations — are still located in Poland and Belarus, the majority of which can be found in the Białowieża Forest including the most numerous population of free-living European bison in the world with most of the animals living on the Polish side of the border. Poland remains the world's breeding centre for the wisent. In the years 1945 to 2014, from the Białowieża National Park alone, 553 specimens were sent to most captive populations of the bison in Europe as well as all breeding sanctuaries for the species in Poland.

Since 1983, a small reintroduced population lives in the Altai Mountains. This population suffers from inbreeding depression and needs the introduction of unrelated animals for "blood refreshment". In the long term, authorities hope to establish a population of about 1,000 animals in the area. One of the northernmost current populations of the European bison lives in Vologodskaya Oblast in the Northern Dvina valley at about 60°N. It survives without supplementary winter feeding. Another Russian population lives in the forests around the Desna River on the border between Russia and Ukraine. The north-easternmost population lives in Pleistocene Park south of Chersky in Siberia, a project to recreate the mammoth steppe ecosystem which began to be altered 10,000 years ago. Five wisents were introduced on 24 April 2011. The wisents were brought to the park from the Prioksko-Terrasny Nature Reserve near Moscow. The bison originated from a population in Denmark. Winter temperatures often drop below −50 °C. Four of the five bison have subsequently died due to problems acclimatizing to the low winter temperature.

Plans are being made to reintroduce two herds in Germany and in the Netherlands in Oostvaardersplassen Nature Reserve in Flevoland as well as the Veluwe. In 2007, a bison pilot project in a fenced area was begun in Zuid-Kennemerland National Park in the Netherlands. Because of their limited genetic pool, they are considered highly vulnerable to illnesses such as foot-and-mouth disease. In March 2016, a herd was released in the Maashorst Nature Reserve in North Brabant. Zoos in 30 countries also have quite a few bison involved in captive-breeding programs.

== Cultural significance ==
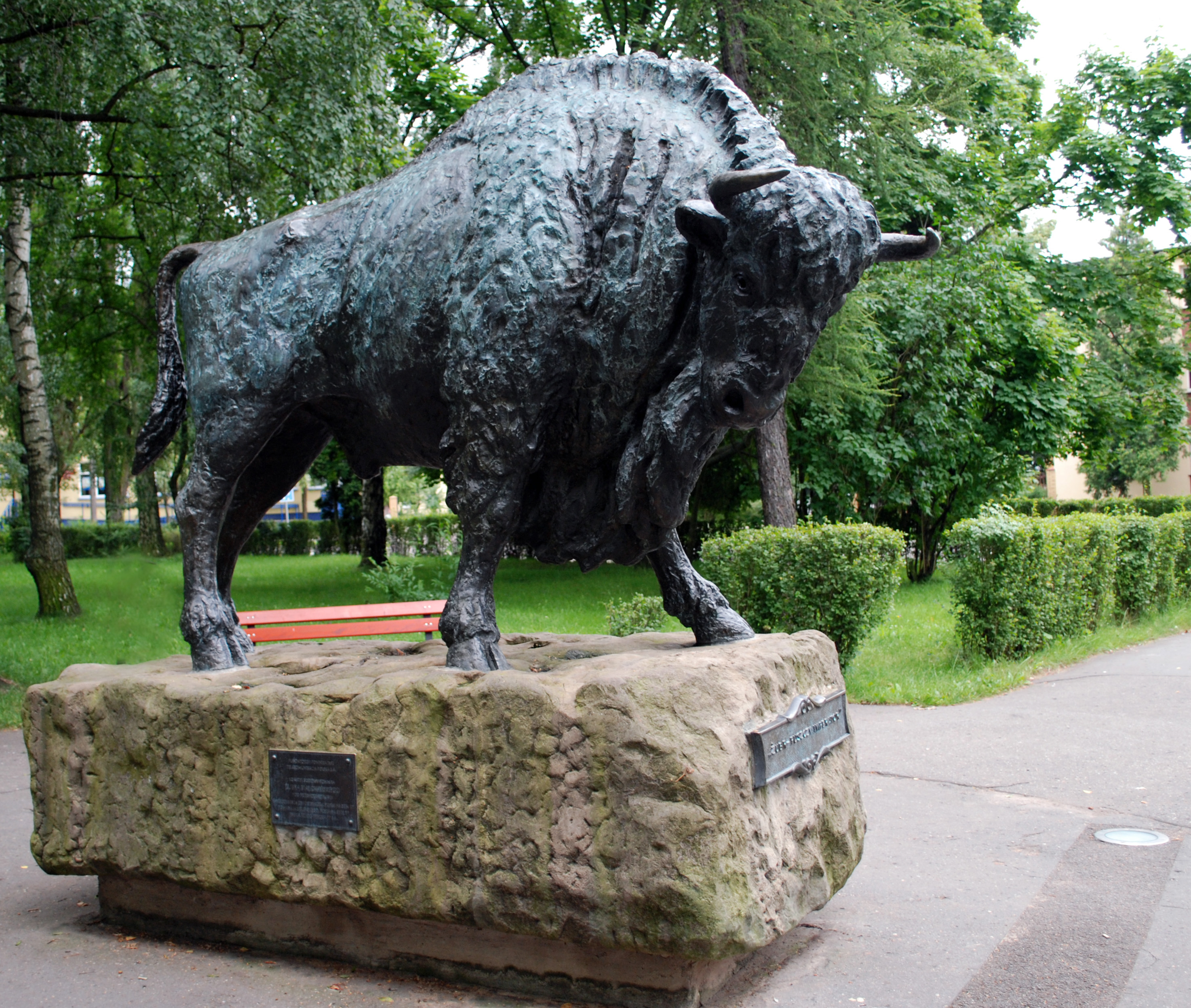
European bison monument in Hajnówka

Representations of the European bison from different ages, across millennia of human society's existence, can be found throughout Eurasia in the form of drawings and rock carvings; one of the oldest and most famous instances of the latter can be found in the Cave of Altamira, present-day Spain, where cave art featuring the wisent from the Upper Paleolithic was discovered. The bison has also been represented in a wide range of art in human history, such as sculptures, paintings, photographs, glass art, and more. Sculptures of the wisent constructed in the 19th and 20th centuries continue to stand in a number of European cities; arguably the most notable of these are the zubr statue in Spała from 1862 designed by Mihály Zichy and the two bison sculptures in Kiel sculpted by August Gaul in 1910–1913. However, a number of other monuments to the animal also exist, such as those in Hajnówka and Pszczyna or at the Kyiv Zoo entrance. Mikołaj Hussowczyk, a poet writing in Latin about the Grand Duchy of Lithuania during the early 16th century, described the bison in a historically significant fictional work from 1523.

The European bison is considered one of the national animals of Poland and Belarus. Due to this and the fact that half of the worldwide European bison population can be found spread across these two countries, the wisent is still featured prominently in the heraldry of these neighbouring states (especially in the overlapping region of Eastern Poland and Western Belarus). Examples in Poland include the coats of arms of: the counties of Hajnówka and Zambrów, the towns Sokółka and Żywiec, the villages Białowieża and Narewka, as well as the coats of arms of the Pomian and Wieniawa families. Examples in Belarus include the Grodno and Brest voblasts, the town of Svislach, and others. The European bison can also be found on the coats of arms of places in neighbouring countries: Perloja in southern Lithuania, Lypovets and Zubrytsia in west-central Ukraine, and Zubří in east Czechia – as well as further outside the region, such as Kortezubi in the Basque Country, and Jabel in Germany.

A flavoured vodka called Żubrówka ([ʐuˈbrufka]), originating as a recipe of the szlachta of the Kingdom of Poland in the 14th century, has since 1928 been industrially produced as a brand in Poland. In the decades that followed, it became known as the "world's best known Polish vodka" and sparked the creation of a number of copy brands inspired by the original in Belarus, Russia, Germany, as well as other brands in Poland. The original Polish brand is known for placing a decorative blade of bison grass from the Białowieża Forest in each bottle of their product; both the plant's name in Polish and the vodka are named after żubr, the Polish name for the European bison. The bison also appears commercially as a symbol of a number of other Polish brands, such as the popular beer brand Żubr and on the logo of Poland's second largest bank, Bank Pekao S.A.

== See also ==
- Białowieża National Park
