= Rabe, Lesko County =

Rabe
- Village
- Location within Poland
- Coordinates: 49°19′11″N 22°15′41″E
- Country: Poland
- Voivodeship: Subcarpathian
- County: Lesko
- Gmina: Baligród
- Population: 333

Rabe [ˈrabɛ] is a village in the administrative district of Gmina Baligród, within Lesko County, Subcarpathian Voivodeship, in south-eastern Poland.
