= Milovice (disambiguation) =

Milovice is a town in the Central Bohemian Region, Czech Republic.

Milovice may also refer to places in the Czech Republic:

- Milovice (Břeclav District), a municipality and village in the South Moravian Region
- Milovice u Hořic, a municipality and village in the Hradec Králové Region
- Milovice, a village and part of Soběsuky in the Zlín Region

== See also ==
- Milovice Nature Reserve
