= Tauros Programme =

Dutch cattle-breeding project

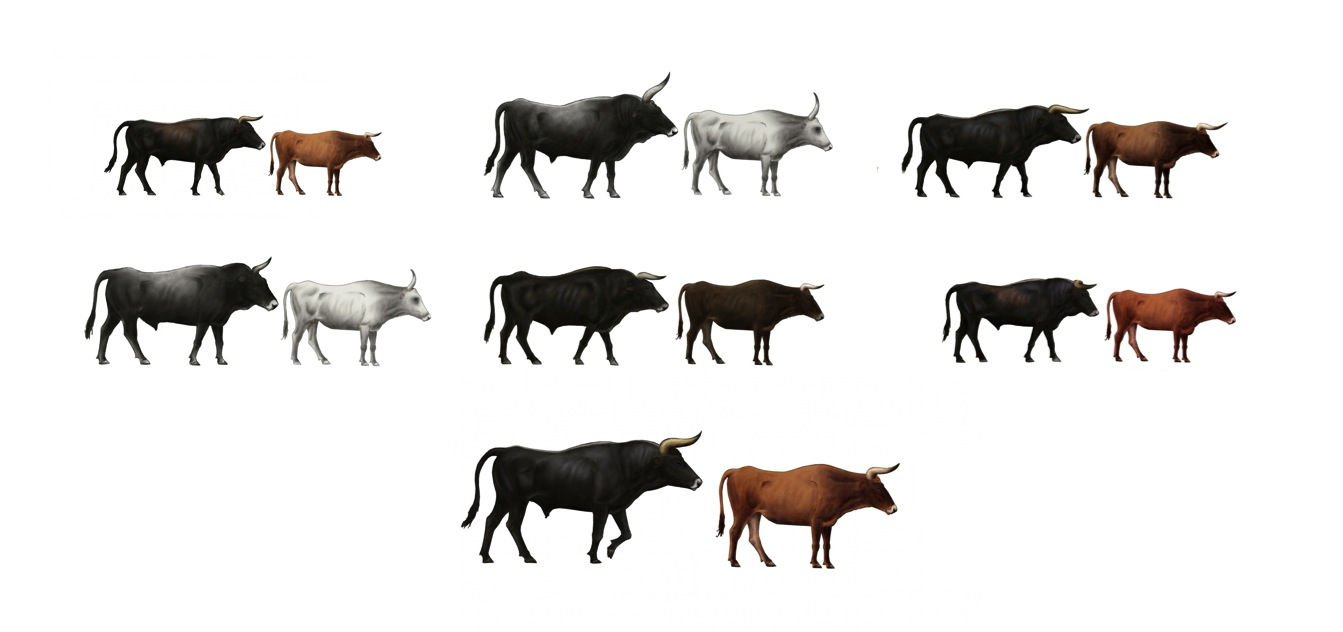
Main breeds used in Tauros programme. Upper row from left to right: Limia, Maremmana primitivo, Maronesa. Lower row: Podolica, Sayaguesa, Pajuna. Down below, the phenotypic and ecologic breeding target, the Aurochs.

The Tauros Programme, formerly known as TaurOs Project, is a cooperation between the Dutch foundation Stichting Taurus and universities such as the Wageningen University and Research Centre. It is an international effort to breed a type of cattle that resembles the extinct aurochs, the wild ancestor of domestic cattle.

The project largely uses hardy cattle breeds with superficial resemblance to the extinct aurochs. By crossbreeding and selective breeding it tries to establish similarity to the aurochs. The long-term goal is to release these Tauros cattle into rewilding areas. The project was founded in 2008, and the actual breeding program started the following year.

== Background ==
In line with the wood-pasture hypothesis, herbivorous megafauna are considered important tools of nature conservation in maintaining the biodiversity of open or park-like landscapes without human interference. Therefore, it is planned to reintroduce large game in several reserves to recreate the natural dynamics of the European ecosystems. The aurochs was one of the most important European ungulates but was hunted to extinction over most of Europe in the Middle Ages. Despite attempts at conservation, the last known pure-bred aurochs died in Jaktorów Forest, Poland in 1627. Thus, so-called rewilding has to work with its domesticated descendants, of which several breeds are hardy and robust enough to fill this gap. In many grazing projects, especially in Germany, Heck cattle are used, together with Galloways and Highland cattle. Heck cattle originated in the 1920s as an attempt by Lutz and Heinz Heck to breed an aurochs look-alike from several cattle breeds. Heck cattle turned out to be a hardy breed, but are found to be considerably different from the aurochs in several aspects.

The Tauros Programme is one of several breeding back attempts. This is based on the idea that original features of the aurochs are still present in some less-derived cattle breeds and can be reunited by crossbreeding and selective breeding. Stichting Taurus has been running grazing projects with hardy cattle and horses for years and purchased cattle breeds they consider to be useful for the project from southern Europe.

== Methods and goal ==
The tauros programme uses very hardy cattle breeds, which should preferably resemble the aurochs to a useful extent. Crossbreeding and selective breeding with such breeds should create new lineages which are hoped to come close to the aurochs as much as possible and are fit for being released in European wild reserves. Not only the phenotype and robustness are in the focus of breeding, but also genetic information of the aurochs which might be preserved in these breeds is considered. There are variations within each breed, so selection criteria are necessary to select the individuals to be included on the project. Accordingly, studies are running parallel under the umbrella of the project, e.g., to evaluate possible introgression of wild aurochs into the European cattle population. Furthermore, the food choice and behaviour of the used breeds are examined.

The breeds which are used for crossbreeding mostly stem from the Iberian Peninsula and Italy. For example, these are Sayaguesa Cattle, Pajuna Cattle, Italian Podolica and Maremmana primitivo. Although claimed to be genetically close to the aurochs, the Lidia breed (Spanish fighting bull) was not used for the project due to its aggressive behaviour. These primitive breeds have decreased in numbers during the last decades, and some are highly endangered. Scottish highland cattle are used as well, because this breed has a long and dense coat and is very hardy. Several cross individuals have been born already.

Members of the project hope that the Tauros cattle will one day be able to move freely in wild herds in European nature areas just as red deer, wild boar, and wolves do.

It is claimed by the project that the genetic relationship between a number of cattle breeds and the aurochs is examined.

== Breeds in use and present crossbreeding results ==
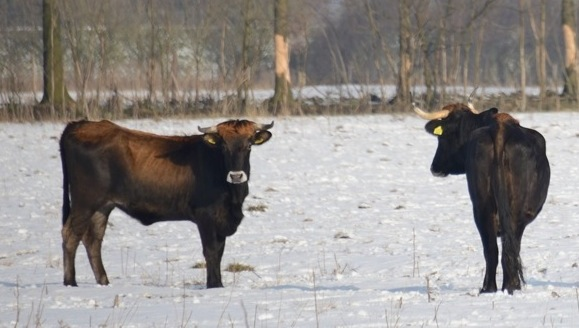
Sayaguesa cows in Keent, Netherlands

The following robust cattle breeds are presently used:

- Sayaguesa Cattle
- Maremmana primitiva
- Pajuna Cattle
- Limia Cattle
- Maronesa
- Podolica
- Highland Cattle
- Tudanca Cattle
- Boškarin

All breeds except Boškarin are being used for breeding in the Dutch herds. Outside of the Netherlands, mainly Sayaguesa, Maremmana, Maronesa and Boškarin are being used as founding breeds, supplemented by crossbreeds from the Dutch sites. By the end of 2015, over 150 animals of the founding breeds have been used in breeding, and almost 300 cross animals have been born, among them 17 animals already of the fourth cross-generation.

== Locations ==
- Netherlands: In Keent Nature Reserve (Oss), Kempen~Broek (Weert), Herperduin-Maashorst (Oss/Uden), Kraaijenbergse Plassen (Cuijk), De Maurik (Mill), and Geuzenbos (Rotterdam Harbour).
- Portugal: Since 2013 in Faia Brava.
- Spain: Since 2013 in Campanarios de Azaba.
- Croatia: Since 2014 in the Lika plains at the foot of the Velebit Mountains.
- Czech Republic: Since 2015 in Milovice Nature Reserve and since 2018 in Modrá.
- Romania: Since 2015 in Sfântu Gheorghe (Danube Delta).

== Incident ==
In 2014 a mountaineer was killed in the Velebit Mountains by a Sayaguesa bull that was part of the project. The bull was later euthanized.

== See also ==
- Breeding back
- Uruz Project
