= Grazelands Rewilding =

Dutch conservation organization

Grazelands Rewilding, formerly Stichting Taurus, is a Dutch foundation which uses large herbivores grazing under natural circumstances for nature conservation. Robust cattle and horse breeds are used for this purpose.

== Background and practise ==
Large herbivore species like the aurochs, wisent, elk, and wild horse play an important role in the dynamics between fauna and flora and their grazing is recognized as essential for maintaining the biodiversity in open, park-like areas. Therefore, their re-introduction into Europe's natural areas is deemed necessary, but some of these species are extinct in the wild. For these, their domesticated descendants have to be used.

Stichting Taurus uses Exmoor ponies and Konik horses as large equine grazers. Robust cattle breeds like the Scottish Highland cattle and Galloways are used as well, in addition to aurochs-like primitive breeds like Sayaguesa Cattle, Pajuna Cattle, Maremmana primitivo, Tudanca cattle, and others. The robust grazers can survive without supplementary food during the winter and roam freely in the natural landscape of Keent the whole year.

== Further projects ==
In the early 2000s Stichting Taurus instigated the Tauros Programme, which is a project attempting to breed a type of cattle which comes as close as possible to the extinct aurochs by crossbreeding and selecting the robust and aurochs-like cattle breeds. This aurochs-like cattle is planned to be released into European wild areas. In 2010 it became a cooperative effort when the Dutch organisation Ark Nature (NL) joined the project, and in 2011 it became a European effort when Rewilding Europe joined.

== See also ==
Milovice Nature Reserve
