= Milovice =

- Town
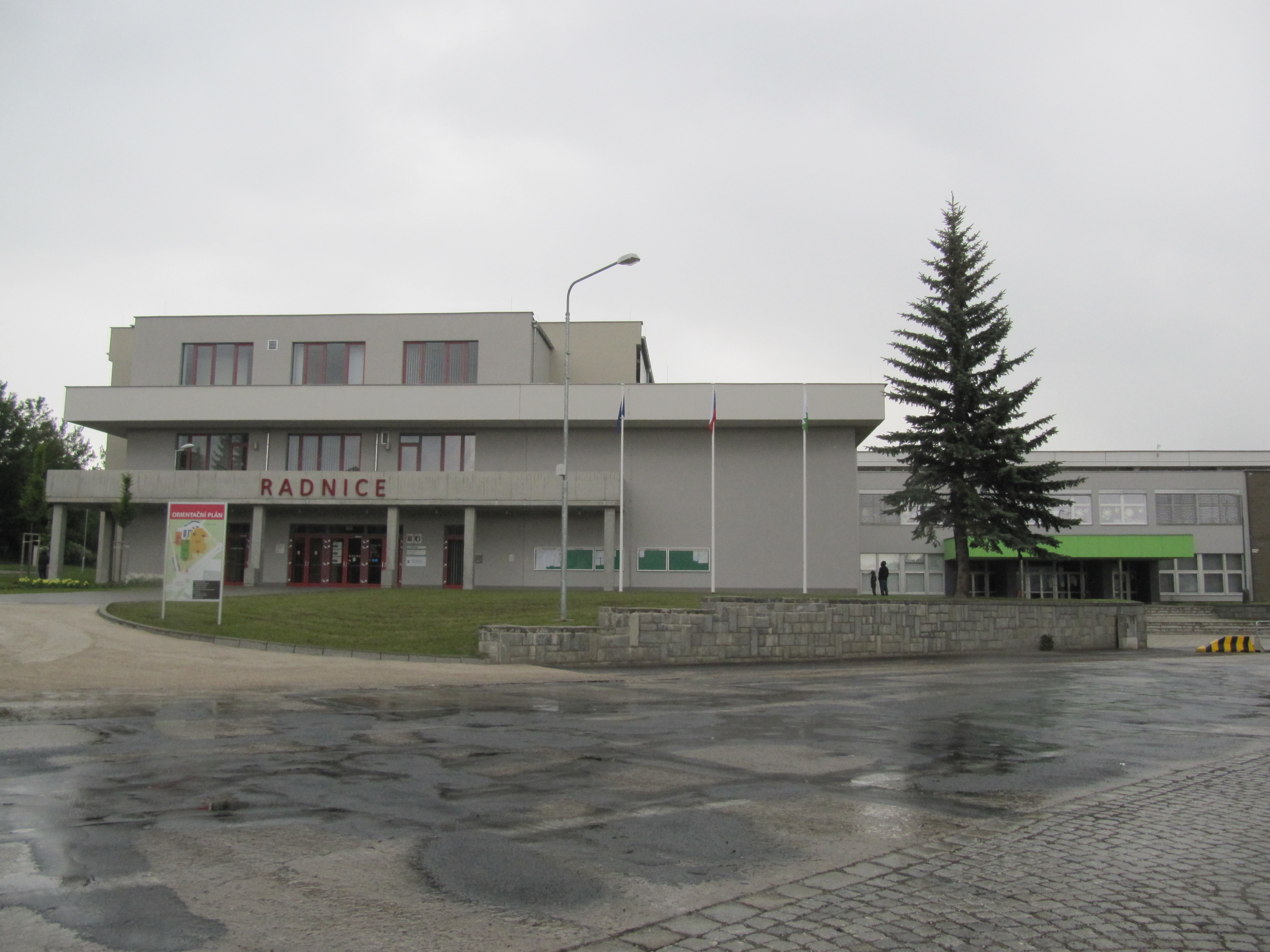
- Town hall on the town square

- Flag Coat of arms

- Location in the Czech Republic
- Coordinates: 50°13′44″N 14°53′26″E
- Country: Czech Republic
- Region: Central Bohemian
- District: Nymburk
- First mentioned: 1396

Government
  - Mayor: Milan Pour (ANO)

Area
  - Total: 28.34 km^{2} (10.94 sq mi)
- Elevation: 221 m (725 ft)

Population (2026-01-01)
  - Total: 14,609
  - Density: 515.5/km^{2} (1,335/sq mi)
- Time zone: UTC+1 (CET)
  - Summer (DST): UTC+2 (CEST)
- Postal codes: 289 23, 289 24
- Website: www.mesto-milovice.cz

Milovice (Czech pronunciation: [ˈmɪlovɪtsɛ]; German: Milowitz) is a town in Nymburk District in the Central Bohemian Region of the Czech Republic. It has about 15,000 inhabitants.

In the 20th century, the history of the town was influenced by the presence of a military base. In the 21st century, Milovice is one of the fastest growing towns in the Czech Republic with one of the youngest populations. The town is known for the Milovice Nature Reserve and for the Mirakulum amusement park.

== Administrative division ==
Milovice consists of four municipal parts (in brackets population according to the 2021 census):

- Milovice (3,004)
- Benátecká Vrutice (335)
- Boží Dar (292)
- Mladá (9,082)

== Etymology ==
The name is derived from the personal name Miľ (a pet form of Miloslav), meaning "the village of Miľ's people".

== Geography ==
Milovice is located about 11 kilometres (7 mi) northwest of Nymburk and 28 km (17 mi) northeast of Prague. The western part of the municipal territory lies in the Jizera Table and the eastern part lies in the Central Elbe Table. The Mlynařice Stream, a tributary of the Elbe, flows through the territory.

Milovice is known for the Milovice Nature Reserve. In January 2015, a group of 14 Exmoor ponies was moved from Exmoor National Park to Milovice Nature Reserve in an effort to save the biodiversity of the location through conservation grazing. Other animals in the reserve include aurochs and European bisons.

== History ==
The first written mention of Milovice is from 1396.

Since the 1990s, the town Milovice belongs to the fastest growing suburban areas in the Czech Republic mainly thanks to cheap accommodation left by the Soviet Army.

=== Military base ===
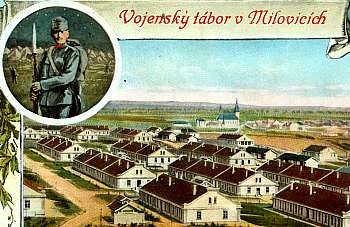
Military camp in 1908

The first military base was founded in Mladá by the Austro-Hungarian Army in 1904. During World War I, there was a prisoner camp of Russian and Italian soldiers, which has a military cemetery in town. After the War, the newly founded Czechoslovak Army started to use the camp as a main military base in Bohemia. During the German occupation of Czechoslovakia, the base served as a centre for German film propaganda, where fake footage from the Eastern Front was shot.

In 1968 the base came under Soviet control, played an important role during the Warsaw Pact invasion of Czechoslovakia, and became the headquarters for the Central Group of Forces afterwards. They built a massive airport and accommodation for about 100,000 Soviet soldiers and their relatives. The last of the troops left in 1991 and the base was abandoned in 1995. In August 1996, the revitalisation of the former military training area began.

== Demographics ==
As of 31 December 2025, with an average age of 35.9 years, the town has one of the youngest populations in the country, and the youngest in category of the cities and towns with over 10,000 inhabitants.

Historical population

Year	Pop.	±%
1869	1,597	—
1880	1,882	+17.8%
1890	2,070	+10.0%
1900	1,911	−7.7%
1910	1,732	−9.4%

Year	Pop.	±%
1921	2,868	+65.6%
1930	4,720	+64.6%
1950	5,878	+24.5%
1961	3,872	−34.1%
1970	2,747	−29.1%

Year	Pop.	±%
1980	1,521	−44.6%
1991	1,330	−12.6%
2001	4,212	+216.7%
2011	10,140	+140.7%
2021	12,713	+25.4%

Source: Censuses

== Transport ==
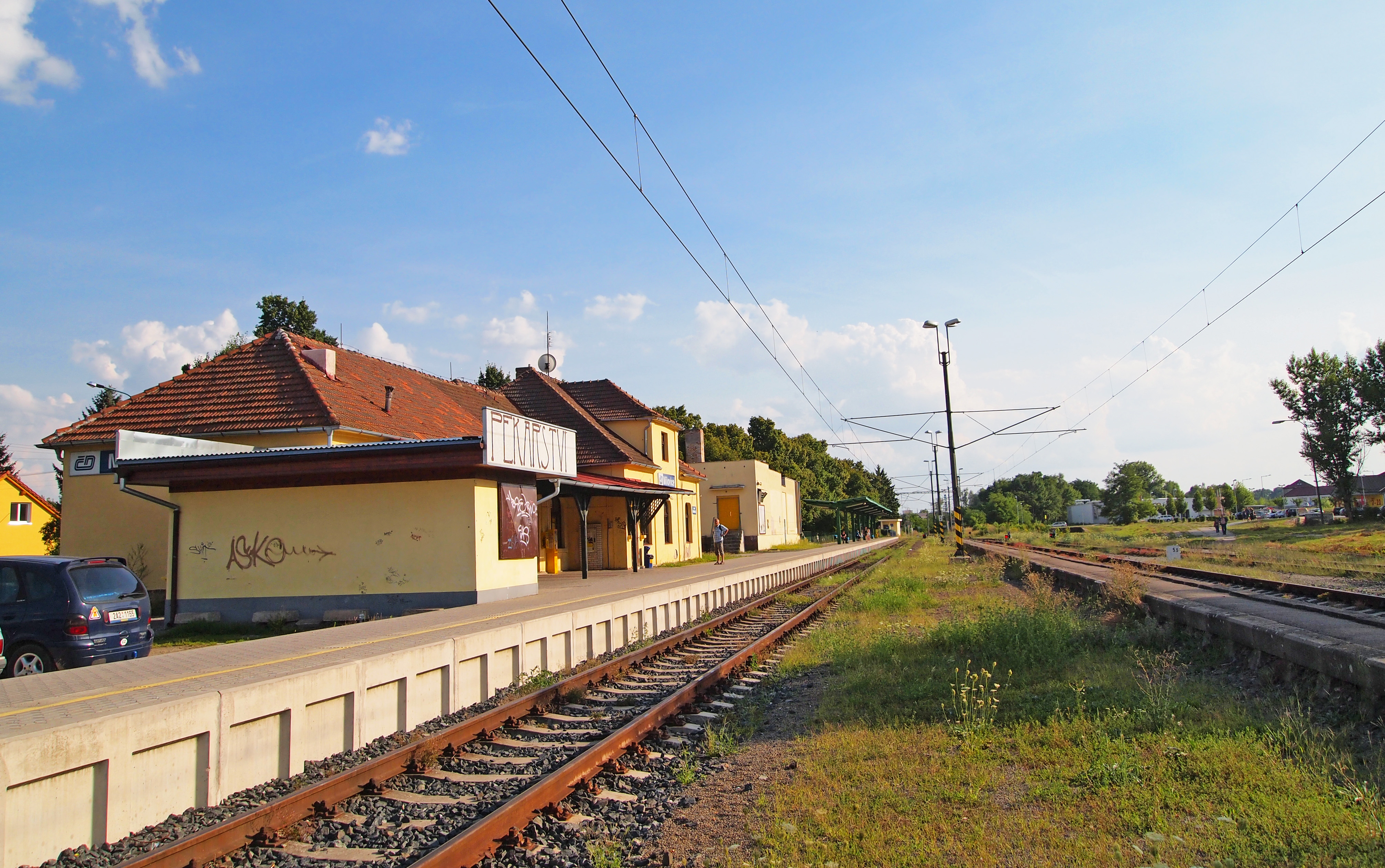
Train station

Milovice is the terminus of a railway line heading from Prague via Lysá nad Labem.

== Culture ==
Since 2015, the Let It Roll festival is held at the former airfield for three days in August, with roughly 25,000 attendees. The festival is focused on electronic music, especially drum and bass and dubstep genres.

== Sights ==
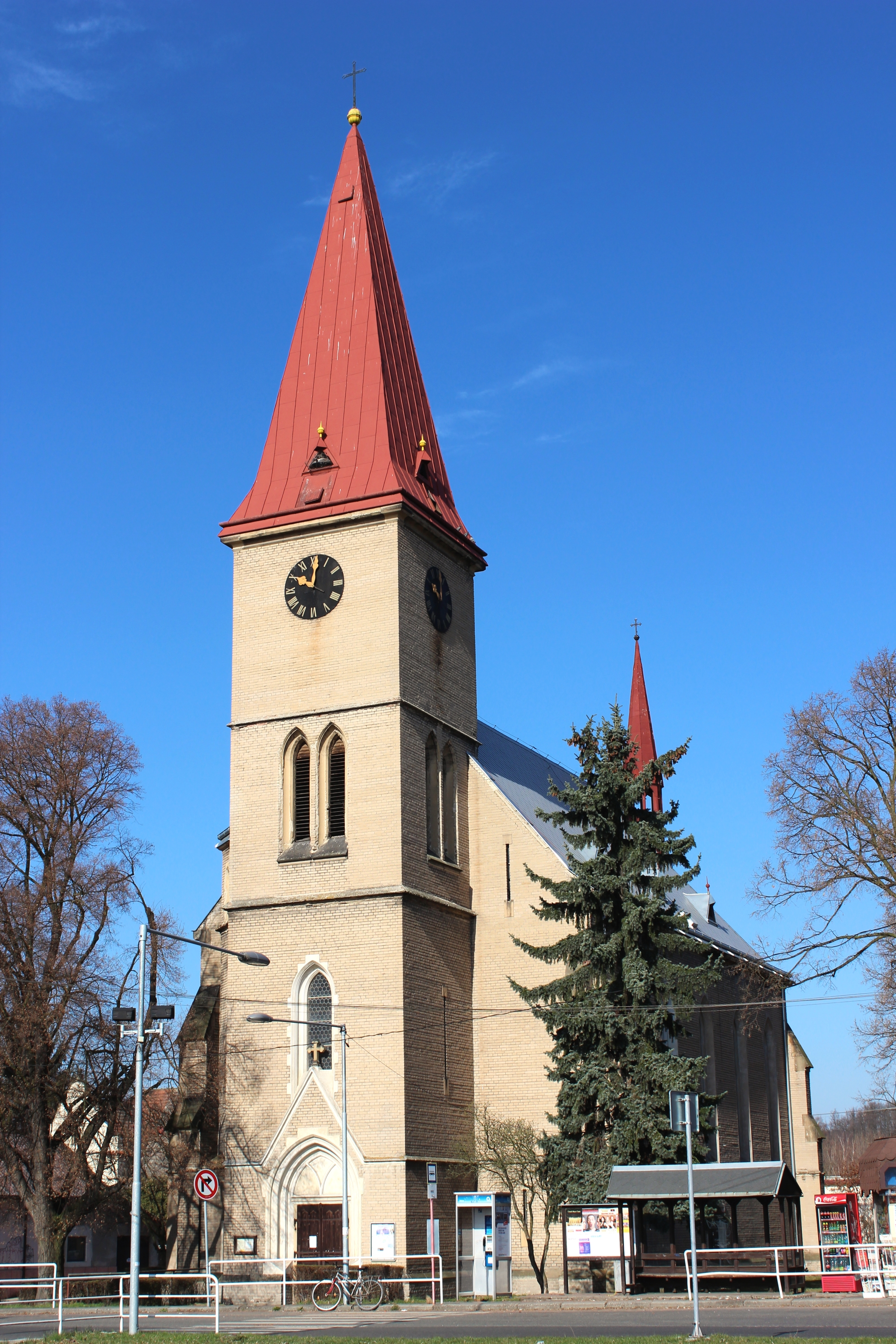
Church of Saint Catherine of Alexandria

The Neo-Gothic Church of Saint Catherine of Alexandria was consecrated in 1907. It was built as a replacement for the destroyed parish complex in the village of Mladá, which was razed to the ground due to the establishment of the military base. The wall decoration dates from 1915 and 1916 and was attended by prisoners of war from the camp.

The international military cemetery was founded in 1915 for victims of World War I. More than 6,000 people of at least 10 nationalities are buried here, 5,276 of which are Italian, therefore the cemetery is called Italian Cemetery.

Mirakulum in Milovice is a family amusement park that is among the most visited tourist destinations in the Central Bohemian Region.

== In popular culture ==
Among the films shot in Milovice are Life and Extraordinary Adventures of Private Ivan Chonkin (1994), EuroTrip (2004), Red Tails (2012) and All Quiet on the Western Front (2022).

== Twin towns – sister cities ==
Milovice is twinned with:

- Conegliano, Italy
- Kistarcsa, Hungary
- Vynnyky, Ukraine
- Senec, Slovakia
- Wołów, Poland

== Gallery ==
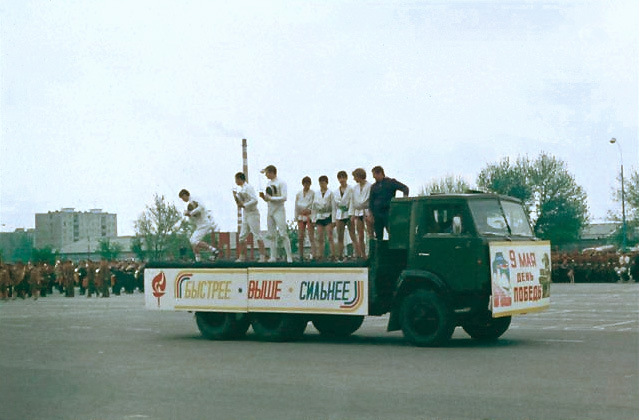
Soviet base in 1984

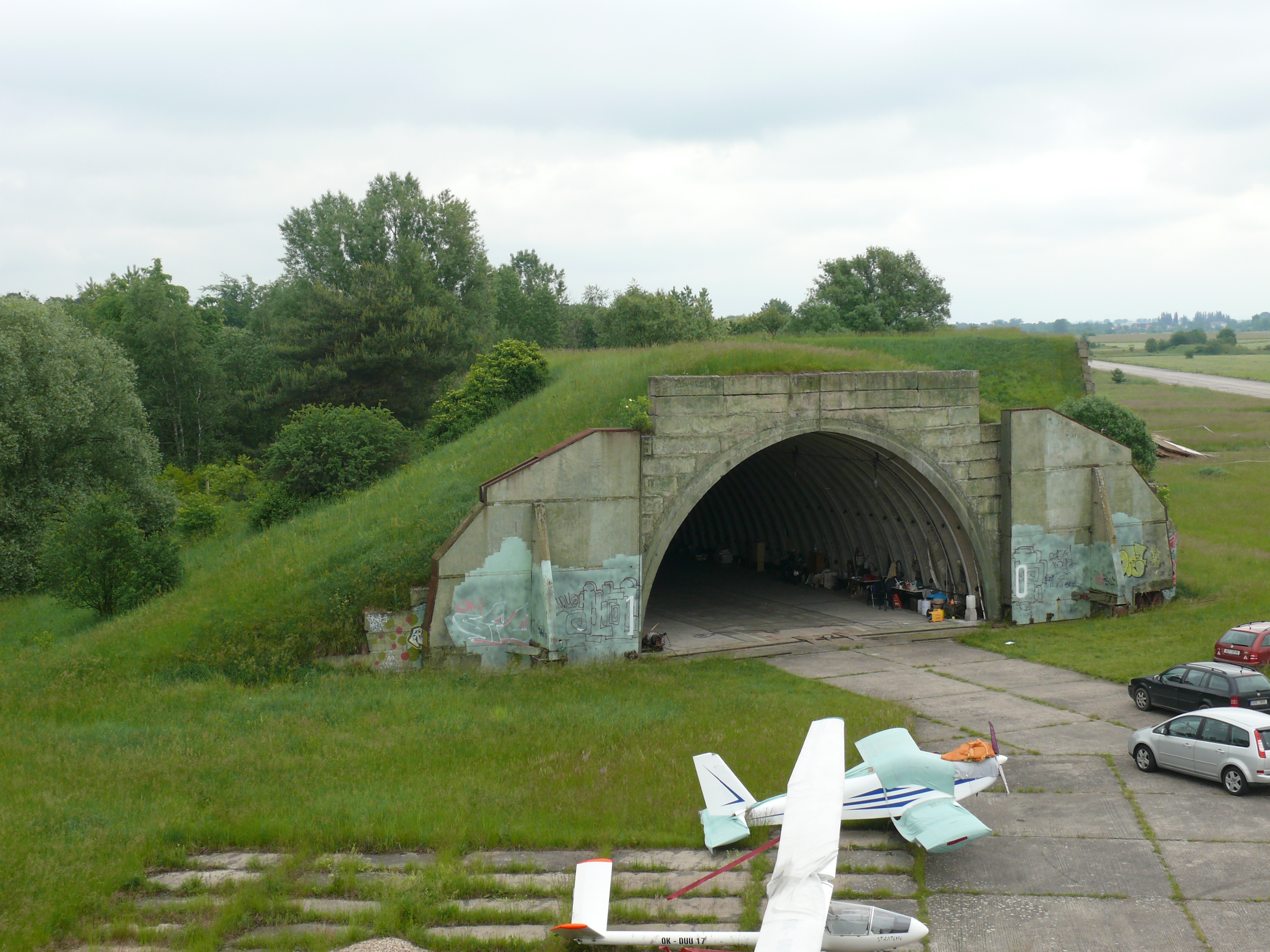
Military aircraft shelter, now re-purposed for civilian recreational aircraft

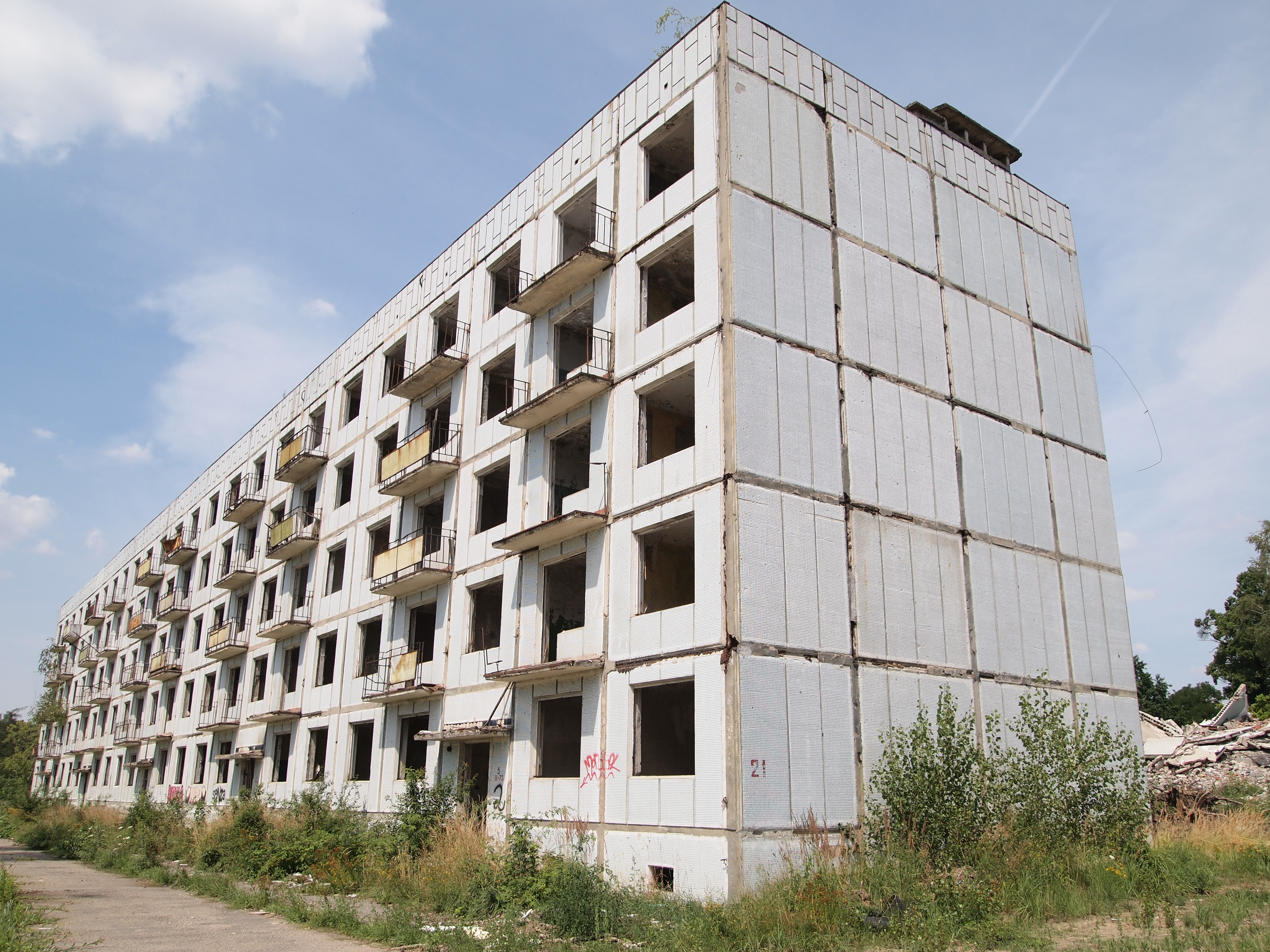
Abandoned building

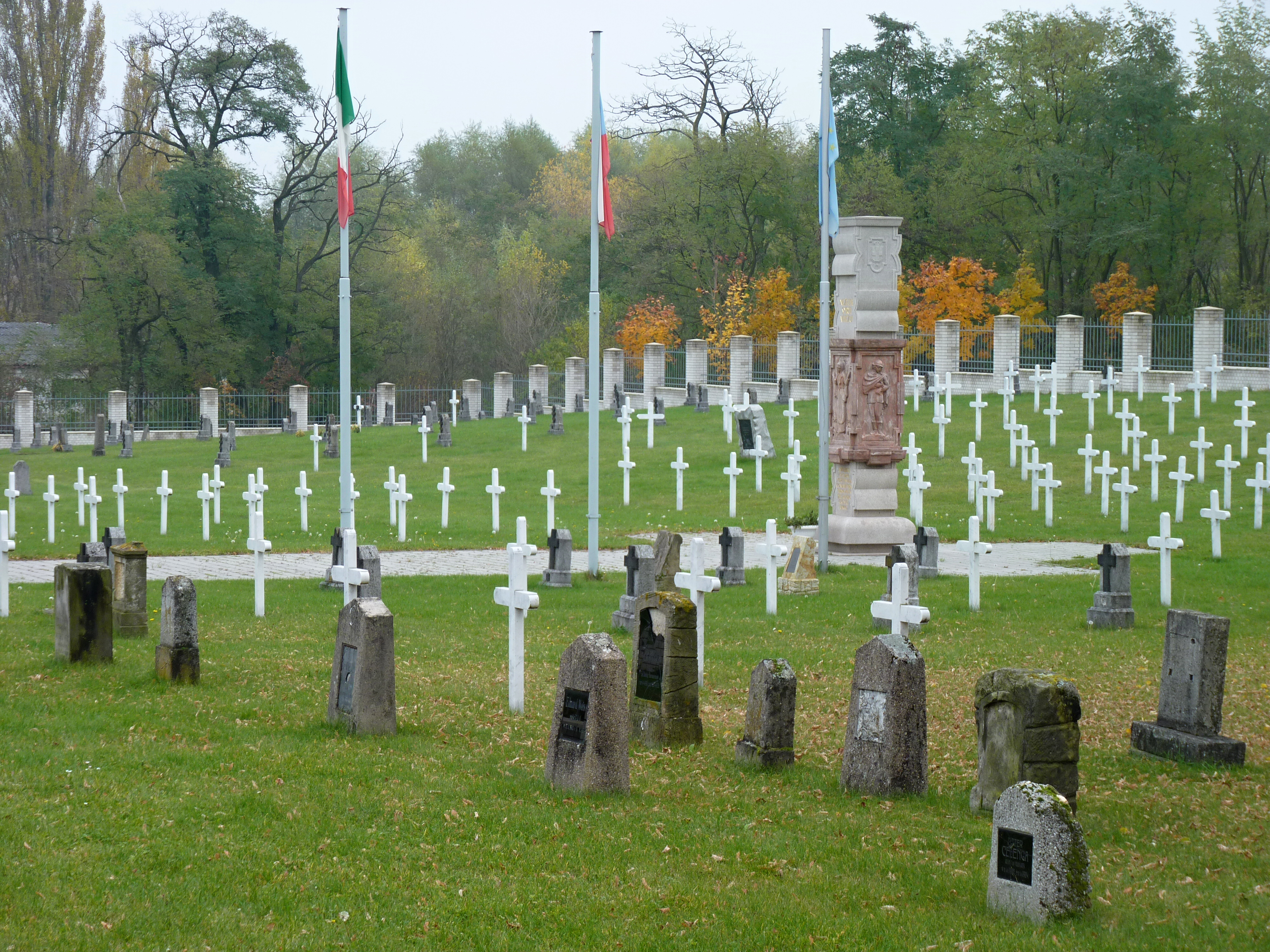
Italian military cemetery

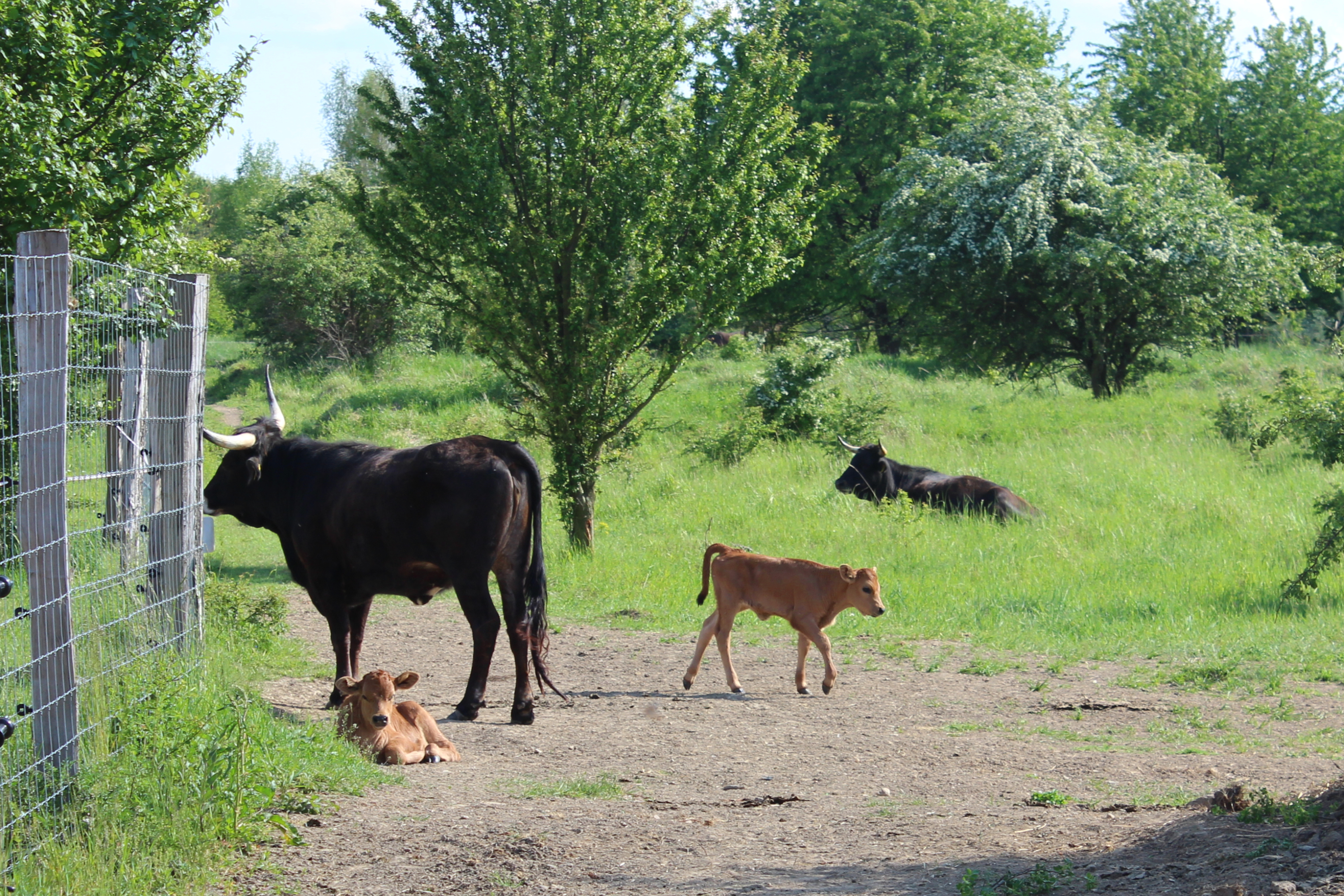
Milovice Nature Reserve
