= Milovice Nature Reserve =

Nature reserve in the Czech Republic

- IUCN category IV (habitat/species management area)
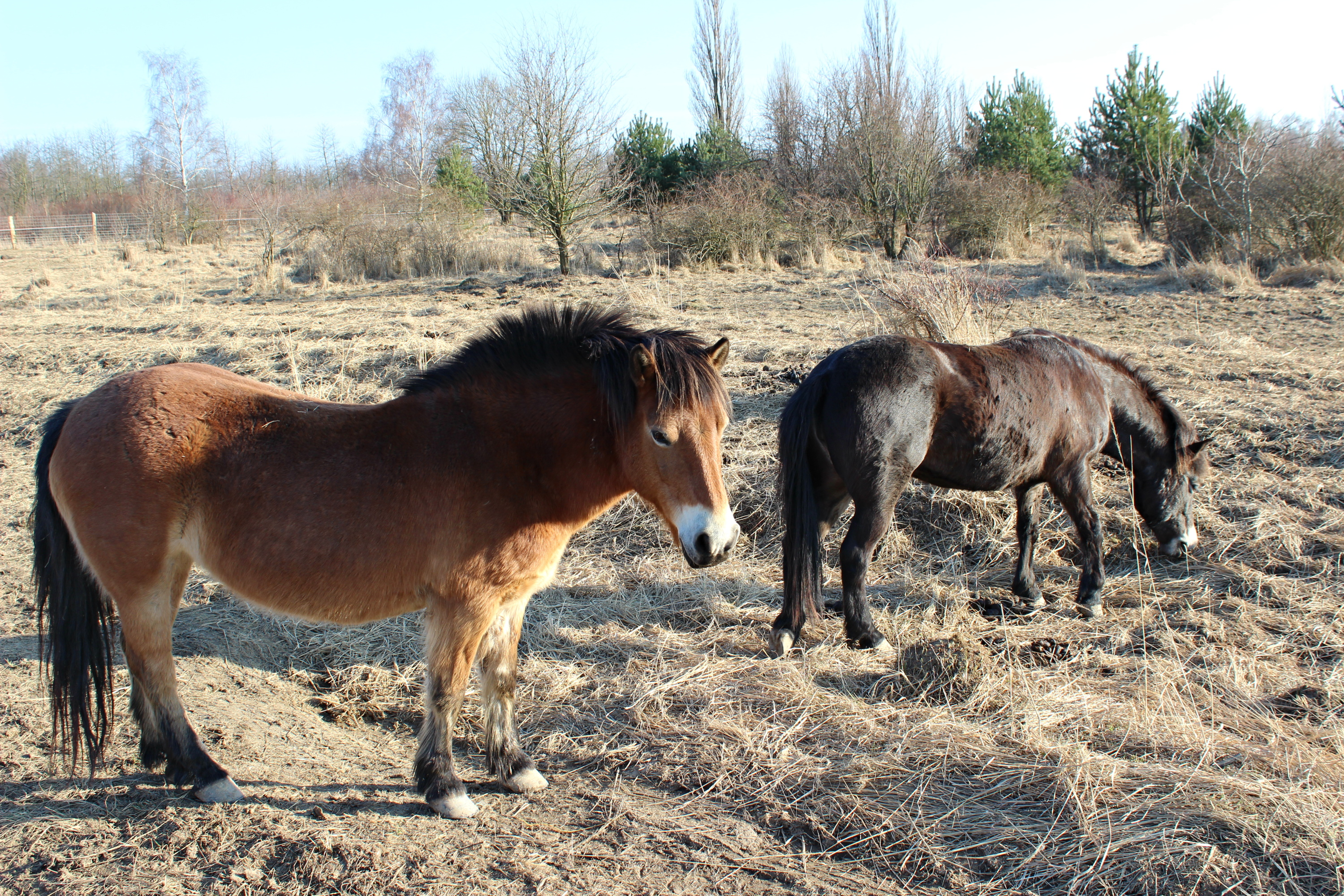
- Rewilding effort - Exmoor ponies

- Location within Czech Republic
- Location: Milovice, Czech Republic
- Nearest town: Benátky nad Jizerou, Milovice
- Coordinates: 50°14′13″N 14°53′8″E
- Area: 350 ha (860 acres)
- Established: 2015
- Operator: Česká krajina o.p.s.
- Website: www.ceska-krajina.cz

Milovice Nature Reserve (Czech: Přírodní rezervace Milovice) is a nature reserve next to the towns of Milovice and Benátky nad Jizerou in Nymburk District, Central Bohemian Region, Czech Republic. Established in 2015, the area is administered by the Česká krajina o.p.s. organization, as a part of Evropsky významná lokalita Milovice-Mladá CZ0214006 protected area, part of the European Union project Natura 2000. This reserve is a pioneering project of the cooperation between several scientific bodies (Czech Academy of Sciences, University of South Bohemia České Budějovice, Charles University Prague, Czech University of Life Sciences Prague, Masaryk University Brno among others) and draws support from many organizations and the private sponsors (EU's Operational Programme Environment - Obnova stanovišť a zavedení pastvy velkých spásačů, Central Bohemian Region, EKOSPOL, Net4Gas, Pivovar Zubr, Nadační fond rodiny Orlických, JK Jewels, State Environmental Fund of the Czech Republic, Milovice and Benátky nad Jizerou townships, American International School of Vienna, Milovice kindergarten, Townshend International School in Hluboká nad Vltavou and more).

== History ==
A no longer used military proving ground near Milovice has been left fallow, after the departure of heavy machinery the former open landscape started to be overtaken by bushgrass and other expansive species and its biodiversity kept diminishing. Rare species of birds and insects dependent on special ecosystem maintained by military activity started disappearing, until conservation grazing has been suggested as a method of maintaining the rare ecosystem. While the overgrowth management using sheep grazing and scything is being used in some protected areas in the Czech Republic, sheep still graze differently from wild animals and their grazing is selective. Česká krajina came up with a unique proposition - reintroducing three species of large herbivorous mammals.

The project started by fencing in the area and creating an acclimatization pen, then on January 28, 2015, a group of 14 Exmoor ponies were moved from Exmoor National Park to Milovice in an effort to save the biodiversity of the location through conservation grazing.

The first herd of six Tauros cattle, bought from Dutch Taurus Foundation, arrived in October 2015.

The first herd of European bison has been bought from European Bison Friends Society in Poland in November 2014. The group of seven female bisons from three Polish reserves (Pszczyna, Niepołomice and Kiermusy) arrived to Milovice in December 2015.

A second herd of 14 Exmoor mares joined the bison enclosure in December 2015.

In January 2018, nine young Exmoor stallions left Milovice on loan to two more protected areas, four are at Na Plachtě (cz) in Hradec Králové and five at Josefov Meadows bird reserve. The stallions, born in Milovice in 2016, left their herds in accordance with the natural behavior. Young stallions are at around two years of age chased away from their herd by its stallion, they form male groups where they grow stronger and better their skills, so that one day the strongest can fight a local stallion for his herd of mares.

In February 2018, two Tauros heifers left the Milovice herd on loan to Živá voda exposition in Modrá (Uherské Hradiště District). In January 2025 it was announced that The Milovice Nature Reserve, has become the first in Czechia to receive the nation's top three ecological awards. By reintroducing large herbivores such as European bison, Tauros cattle, and Exmoor ponies, the reserve has successfully restored its unique ecosystem, leading to increased biodiversity. This achievement has garnered significant recognition, including the prestigious E.ON Energy Globe Award, often referred to as the ecological "Oscar".

== Rewilding ==
Large herbivorous mammals (bison, aurochs, Eurasian wild horse, elk) used to be an indispensable part of European wildlife. Aurochs and tarpan have been driven to extinction and bison only survived in captivity. Exmoor ponies and Tauros cattle are used as an ecological substitute for the wild horse and aurochs.

=== European bison ===
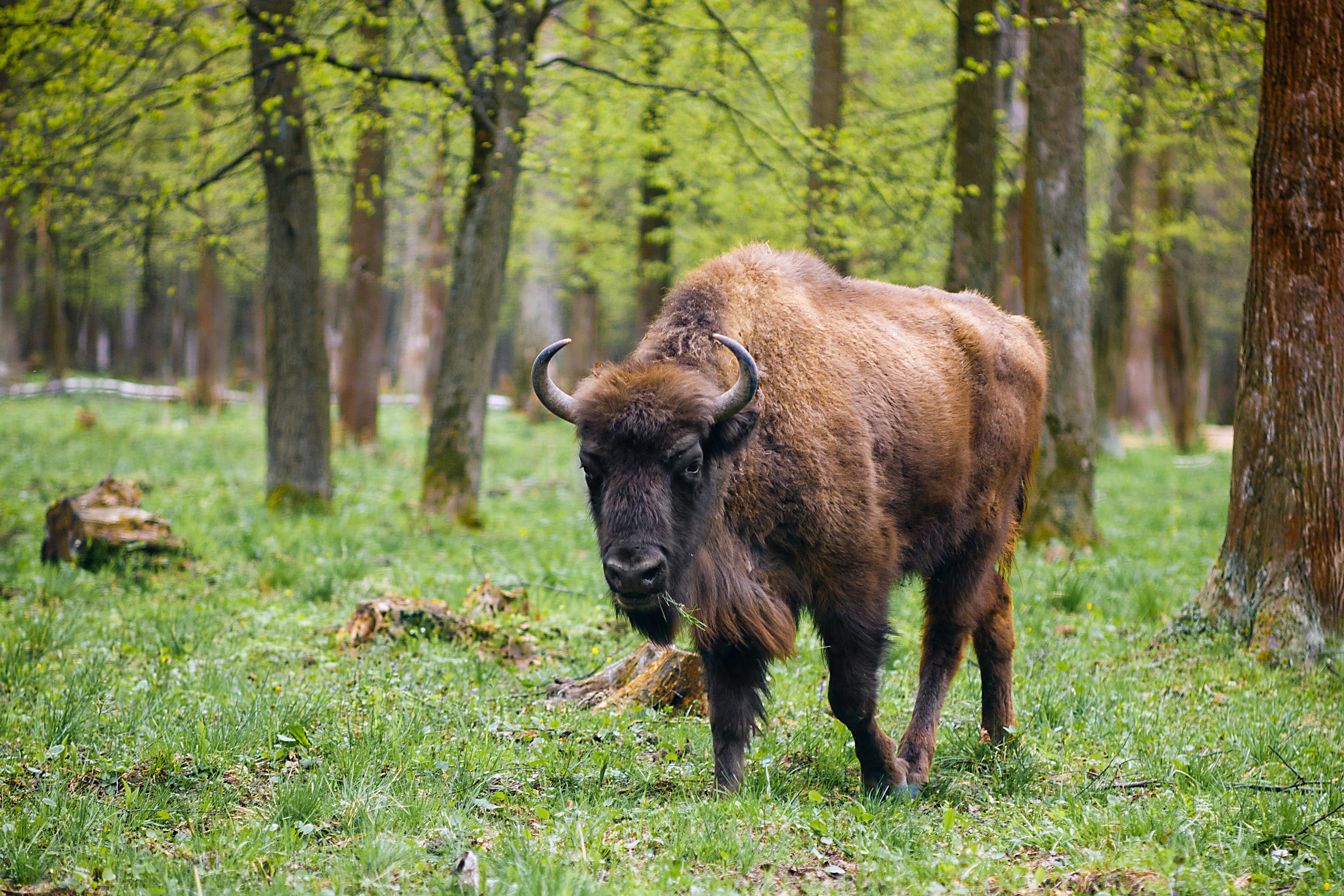
European bison (Bison bonasus)

European bison, also called wisent, has been brought to Milovice from Poland on December 6, 2015. These seven particular Bison bonasus females belong to the rarer lowland (Białowieża) line. The bison has good prospects of reintroduction into the wild in the Czech Republic. As the first step, the herd in Milovice is held in a large enclosure. In January 2016 four-year-old bull Polanin III arrived from Ośrodek Kultury Leśnej in Gołuchow (pl). The first calf was born in May 2016. The international bison studbook has assigned a "TU" prefix to the names of all bisons born in Milovice.

- Numbers in total: 21 European bisons - 8 already born in Milovice (June 2018)

=== Tauros cattle ===
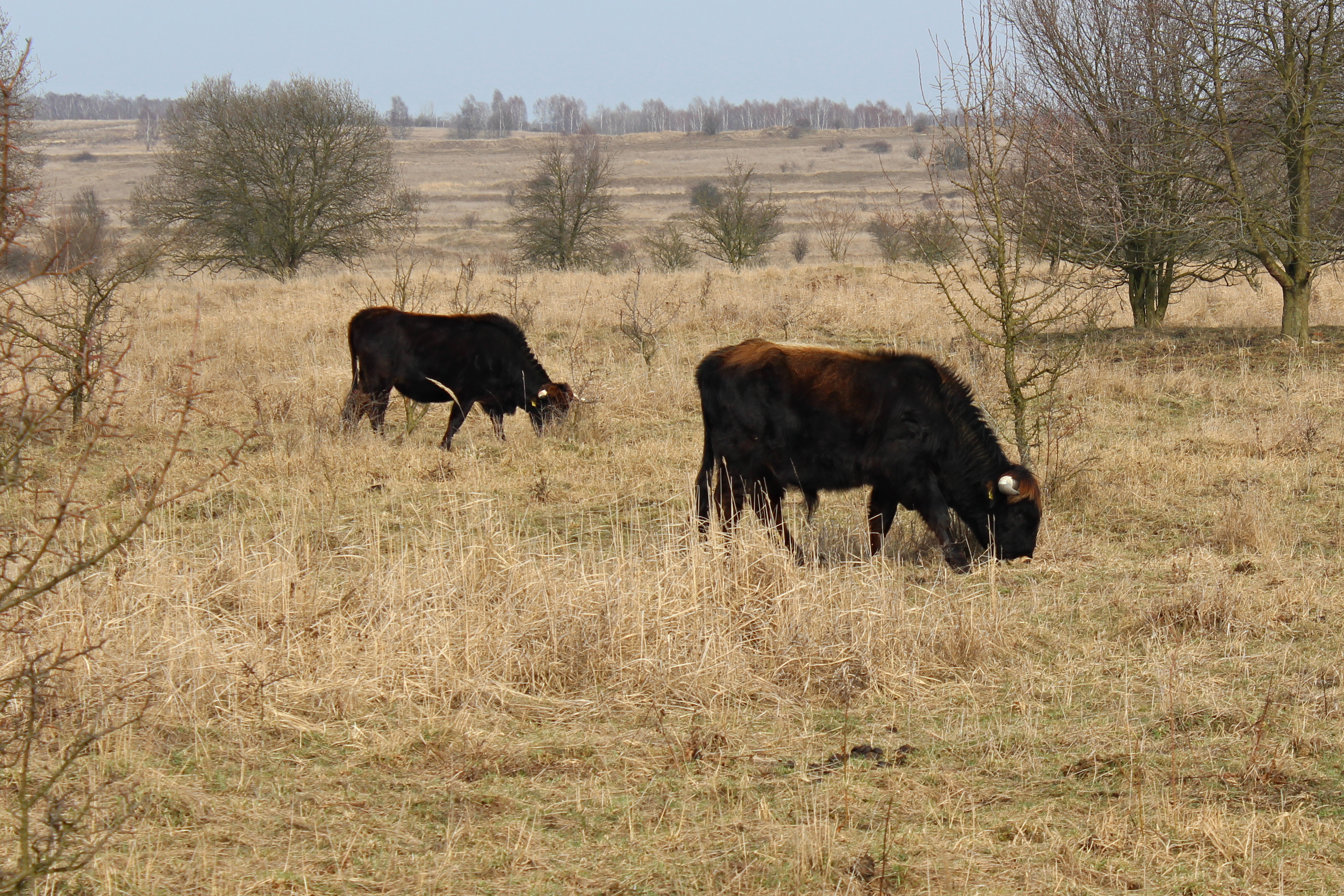
Tauros cattle in Milovice

Since the original aurochs (Bos primigenius) went extinct in 1627, Česká krajina picked breeding back cattle from the Dutch Tauros Programme. Tauros cattle are a crossbreed of several breeds of cattle with the aim to create a breed resembling aurochs. The first herd of Tauros cattle arrived to the Czech Republic in October 2015, one male and five females. The first calf was born in April 2016.

- Numbers in total: 13 Tauros cattle - 7 born in Milovice (February 2018)

=== Horses ===
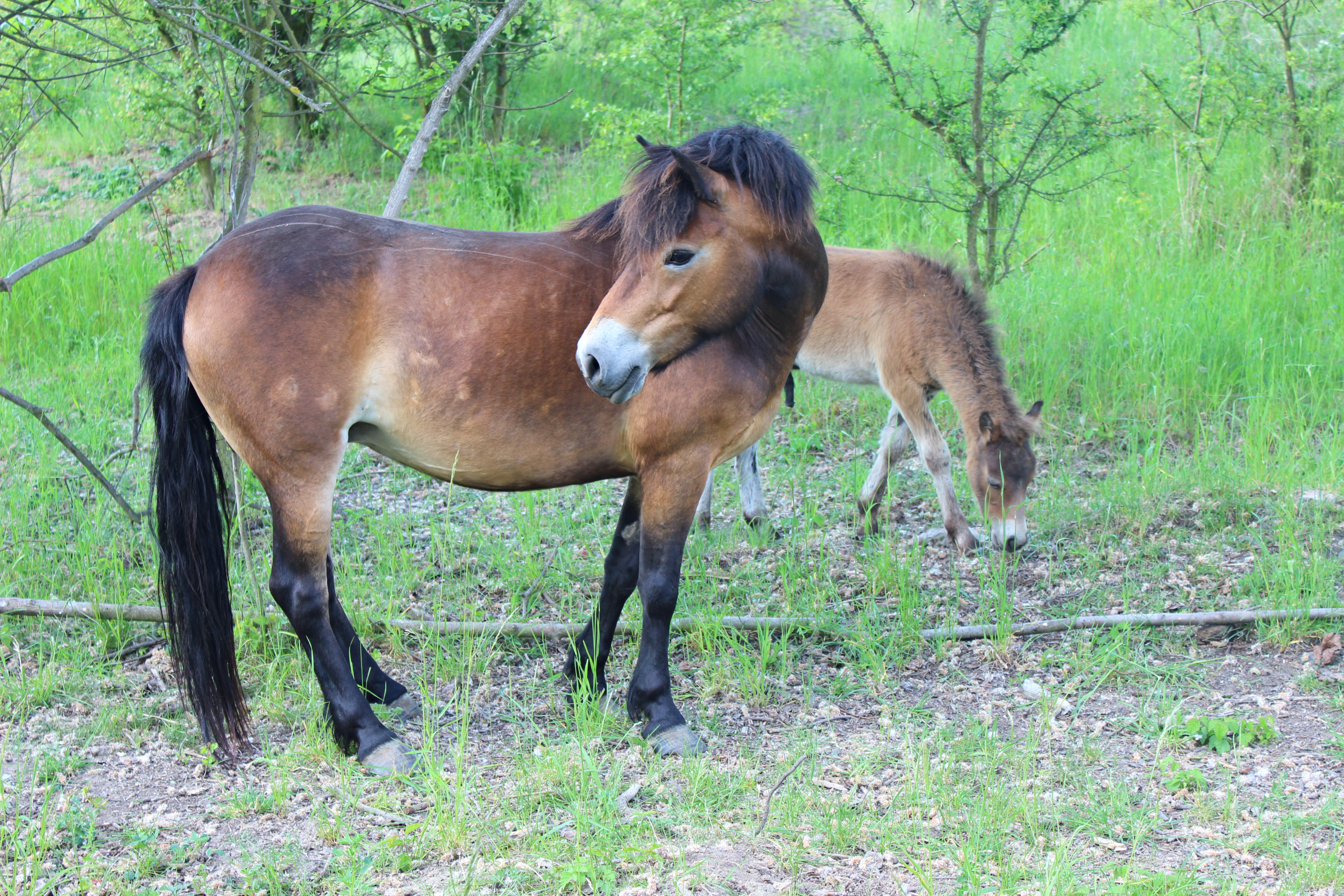
Exmoor pony in Milovice

The very first herd of 14 Exmoor ponies (all mares) arrived to the Czech Republic in January 2015, in April the herd was joined by seven-year-old Exmoor stallion Northcroft Firestarter. The first wild horse foal born in the Czech Republic came on October 22, 2015, therefore her mother, Sgurr Na Ban A’Mhoire, must have come to Milovice already pregnant. The first Firestarter offspring arrived in March 2016. A second herd of Exmoors in the adjoining enclosure includes a second breeding stallion from UK, Tawbitts Mystic Merlin, born 2008.

- Numbers in total: 55 Exmoor ponies - 25 already born in Milovice (February 2018)

== Biodiversity ==
European jackal has been scientifically observed in Milovice since 2015; the first photographic evidence of jackal breeding came in 2017. It is the northernmost documented location in Europe where jackal successfully breeds.

First systematic monitoring of bats in Milovice discovered at least 18 different bat species, making it a two-thirds of the total number of bat species native to the Czech Republic. Higher night-time bat activity was spotted above the large herbivore enclosures, showing the beneficial influence of conservation grazing on insect populations. The bats also benefit from numerous ponds providing them with water and from the dense mosaic of deciduous forests, meadows and steppes. Among the counted species is the rare lesser horseshoe bat, lesser noctule and Bechstein's bat.

A 2016 monitoring of butterflies found 59 species making it 42% of all butterfly species living in the Czech Republic. Eight protected and five endangered species were observed, for example, Phengaris rebeli, large copper, brown argus, Plebejus argyrognomon, silver-washed fritillary, Amanda's blue, silver-studded blue, Meleager's blue, green forester and pearly heath.

A European grey wolf was spotted by a trail cam inside the bison enclosure, so far, it seems the animal had just been passing through.

== See also ==
- Tourism in the Czech Republic
- Protected areas of the Czech Republic
- Rewilding (conservation biology)
- Conservation grazing
- Oostvaardersplassen, a similar large herbivores rewilding project in the Netherlands
- Western Caucasus, the largest bison (wisent) habitat
