= Milovice u Hořic =

- Municipality
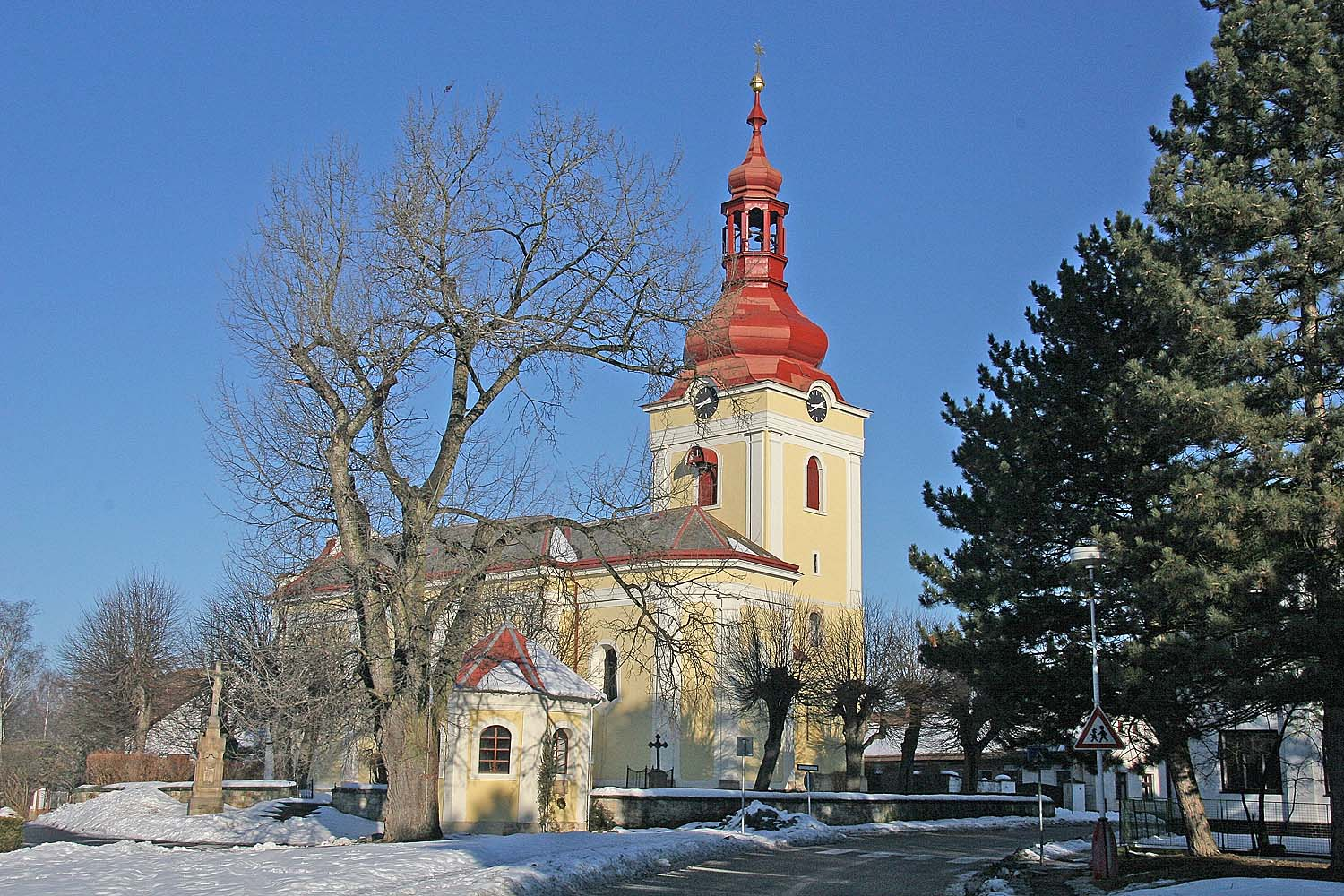
- Church of Saints Peter and Paul

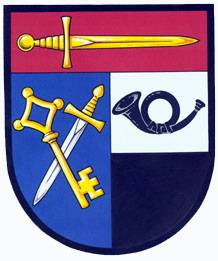
- Flag Coat of arms

- Location in the Czech Republic
- Coordinates: 50°19′47″N 15°37′52″E
- Country: Czech Republic
- Region: Hradec Králové
- District: Jičín
- First mentioned: 1369

Area
  - Total: 3.29 km^{2} (1.27 sq mi)
- Elevation: 271 m (889 ft)

Population (2026-01-01)
  - Total: 314
  - Density: 95.4/km^{2} (247/sq mi)
- Time zone: UTC+1 (CET)
  - Summer (DST): UTC+2 (CEST)
- Postal code: 508 01
- Website: www.miloviceuhoric.cz

Milovice u Hořic is a municipality and village in Jičín District in the Hradec Králové Region of the Czech Republic. It has about 300 inhabitants.

== Demographics ==
Historical population
Year	Pop.	±%
1869	341	—
1880	298	−12.6%
1890	340	+14.1%
1900	334	−1.8%
1910	333	−0.3%
1921	290	−12.9%
1930	294	+1.4%
1950	193	−34.4%
1961	213	+10.4%
1970	191	−10.3%
1980	208	+8.9%
1991	226	+8.7%
2001	247	+9.3%
2011	289	+17.0%
2021	289	+0.0%
Source: Censuses
