= Sayaguesa =

Spanish breed of cattle

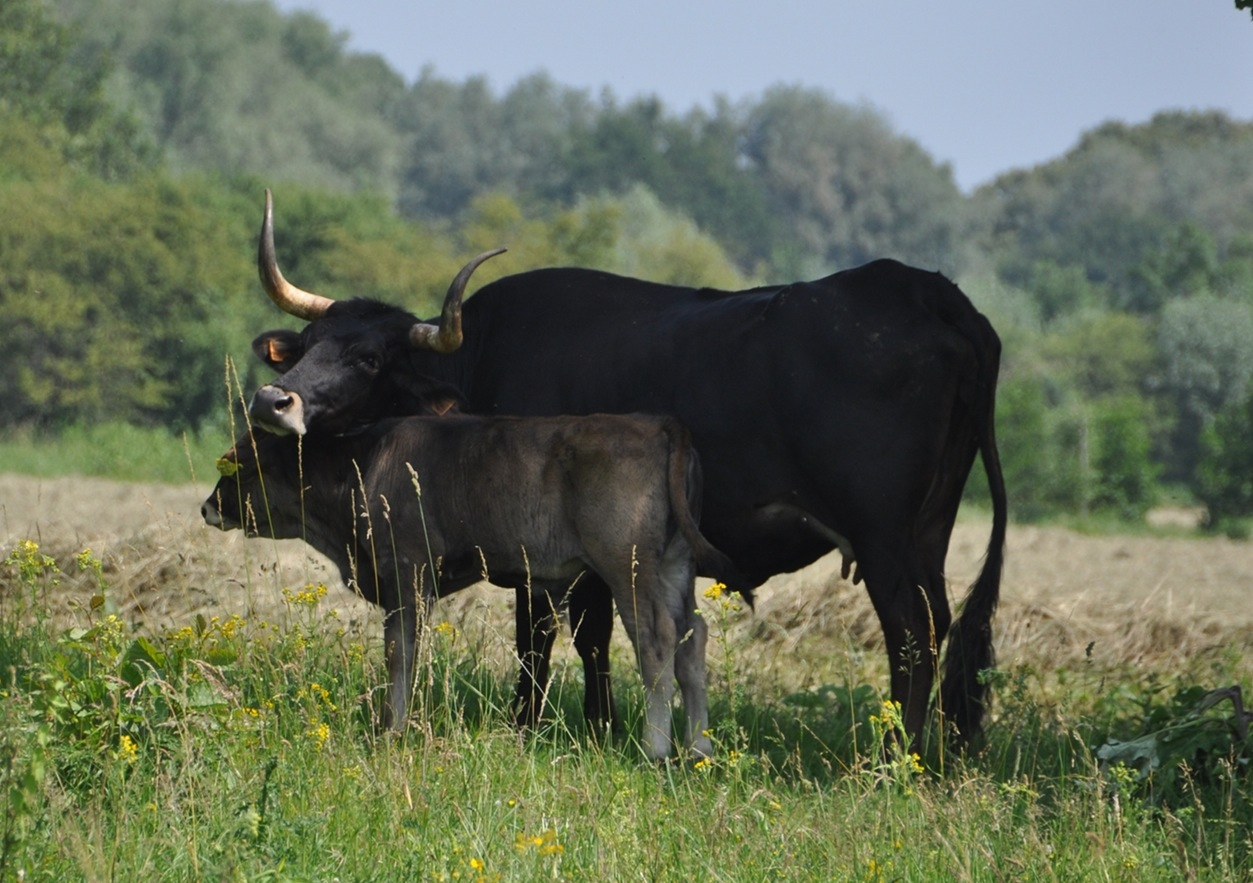
- Conservation status: FAO (2007): endangered-maintained
- Other names: Zamorana; Moles de Sayago; Castellana variedad Sayaguesa; Morenas del Noroeste (1970–1997)
- Country of origin: Spain
- Distribution: Comarca of Sayago, Castilla y León
- Standard: Consejería de Agricultura y Ganadería, Castilla y León
- Use: formerly draught; now meat

Traits
- Weight: Male: average 850 kg; maximum 1100 kg; Female: average 650 kg; maximum 700 kg
- Height: Male: average 158 cm; Female: average 154 cm
- Coat: black, some bleaching
- Horn status: horned in both sexes
- Cattle; Bos (primigenius) taurus

The Sayaguesa is an endangered Spanish breed of domestic cattle. It is named for the comarca of Sayago in the province of Zamora, in the western part of the autonomous community of Castilla y León, and is raised almost exclusively in that area. It may also be known as the Zamorana, the Moles de Sayago or the Castellana variedad Sayaguesa. It was traditionally kept mainly for draught work, but is now raised principally for meat.

== History ==
The Sayaguesa was traditionally kept mainly for draught work; with the mechanisation of agriculture following the Second World War, this use declined. In the 1960s there were successive attempts to improve productive qualities by cross-breeding with Friesian, Braunvieh and Charolais, and later with other breeds. From 1970 the Sayaguesa was included with other regional breeds under the denomination Morenas del Noroeste. In 1997 it achieved separate recognition among the breeds identified by the Ministerio de Agricultura, Alimentación y Medio Ambiente, the Spanish ministry of agriculture, as "at risk of extinction". Registration of the Sayaguesa began in 1980, and in 1981 a breeders' association, the Asociación Española de Criadores de Ganado Bovino de Raza Sayaguesa, was formed. In 1998 a genealogical herd-book was established.

Between 1950 and 1981 the population of the Sayaguesa fell by about a quarter, or some 17000 head. By 2009 only about 450 head remained, on 29 farms. At the end of 2015 the population was 1612, of which almost all were in Castilla y León.

== Characteristics ==
The Sayaguesa is one of the largest indigenous Spanish cattle breeds. It displays considerable sexual dimorphism: bulls may weigh up to 1100 kg and cows up to 700 kg. The height at the withers averages 158 cm for bulls and 154 cm for cows.

The coat is black, sometimes lighter on the underparts. There may be a paler dorsal stripe, which is often absent in cows. The insides of the ears and the area round the mouth are pale. The hooves, muzzle and natural openings are black, the horns are white at the base and tipped with black. The head is relatively small, with a concave profile. Calves are born red, and only later turn black.

The Sayaguesa is hardy, robust and frugal, and well adapted to the poor pastures and harsh environment of its native area.

== Use ==
The Sayaguesa was traditionally kept mainly for draught work; with the mechanisation of agriculture following the Second World War, this use declined, and breeding was directed towards meat production. Calves are slaughtered at an average age of 12 months; the killing-out percentage is approximately 55%.

Pairs of cows may sometimes be yoked to carts for folklore or festival occasions.

The Sayaguesa has been used in nature conservation and in attempts to re-create the extinct aurochs.
