= Pajuna cattle =

Spanish breed of cattle

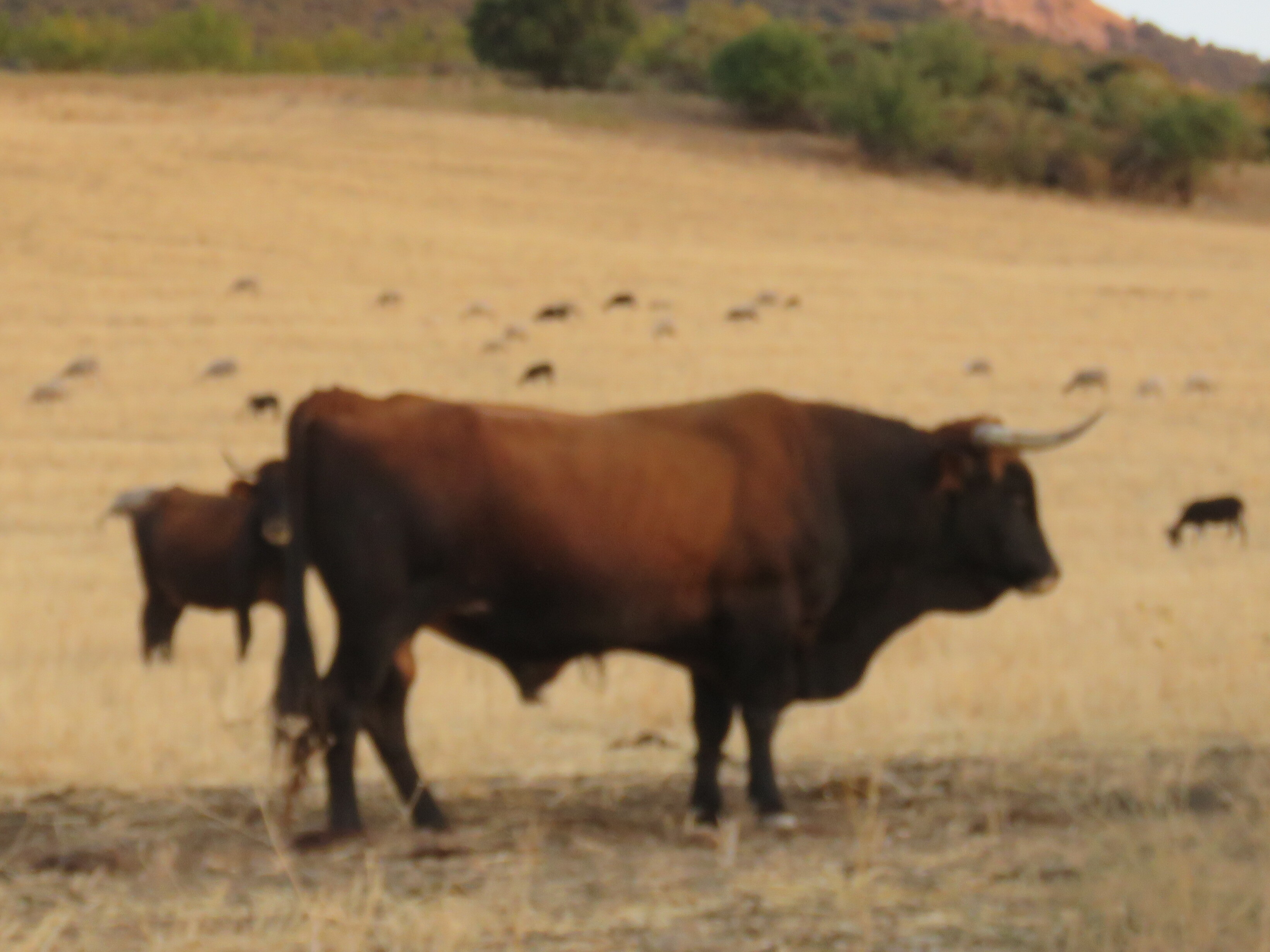
Pajuna bull

The Pajuna is an endangered Spanish breed of cattle originating in Andalusia.

== Characteristics ==
Although the Pajuna has been constantly crossed with breeds such as the Retinta or the Murciana after 1950 and several lineages have lost their primitive characteristics (such as the wild type colour, long legs and athletic body shape) some lineages still bear considerable resemblance to the aurochs. Pajuna bulls weigh 600 kilograms (1,300 lb) on average and can reach a height of 165 centimetres (65 in) at the shoulder. The horns, especially of the bulls, face forwards and are light in colour with a dark tip. Bulls are dark brown to black with a light eel stripe; the cows are a much lighter reddish brown. In this aspect, Pajuna resembles the aurochs. It has been suggested that the breed originated in north Africa, and indeed some bulls have a saddle that looks very similar to depictions of north African aurochs.

== Use ==
This primitive cattle breed is given special protection in the official Spanish cattle breeds catalogue, because numbers have declined rapidly during the 1980s and 1990s. The quality of their meat is valued, but traditionally Pajuna were used as draft animals.

Like other robust cattle breeds, the Pajuna is adapted to harsh conditions, especially in cold mountainous regions. They require supplementary feeding only in extreme weather when grazing is not possible.
