= Highland cattle =

Scottish breed of cattle

Highland
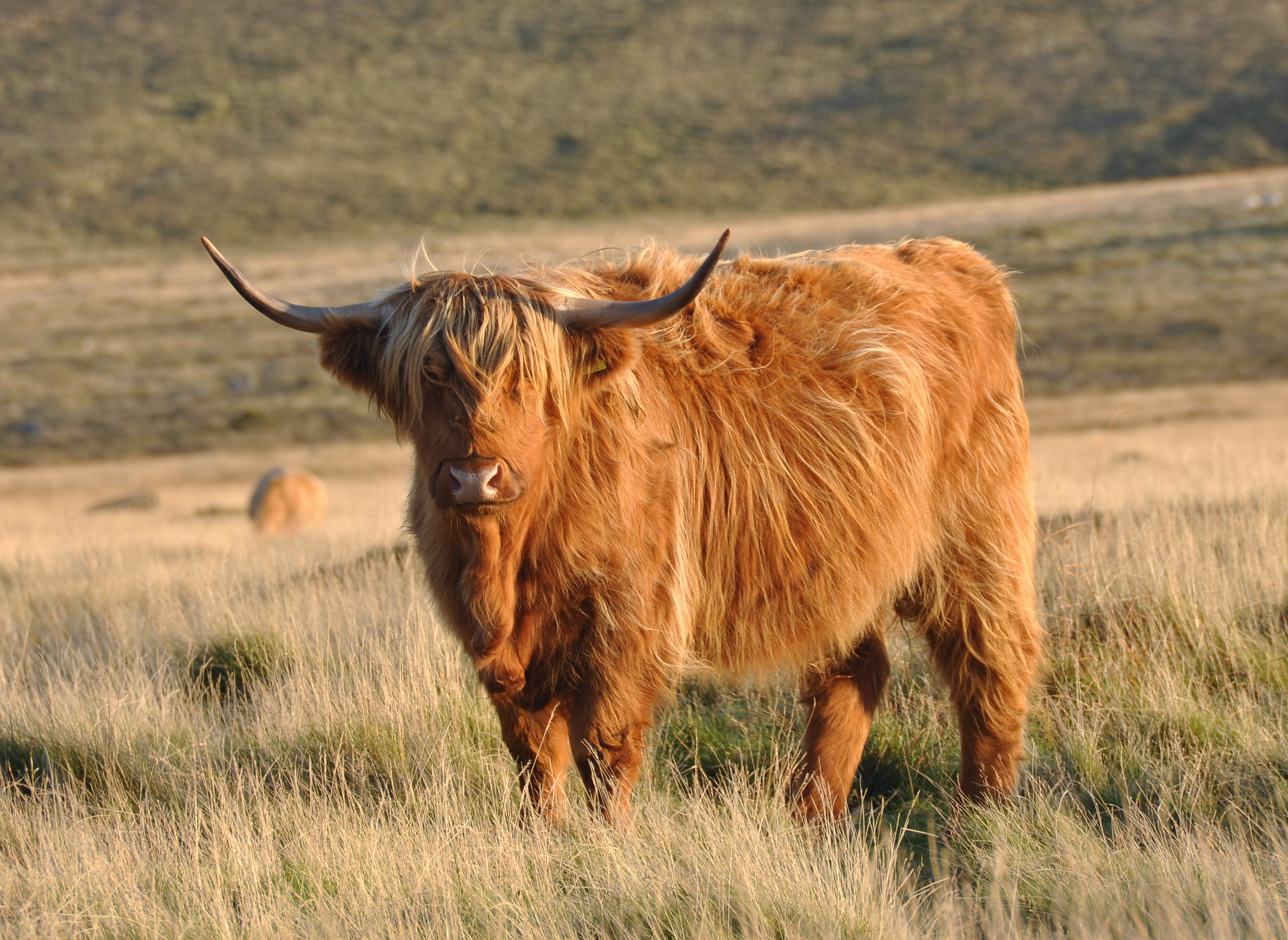
- Cow on Dartmoor, in south-west England
- Conservation status: FAO (2007): not at risk; DAD-IS (2021): endangered/at risk; RBST: UK native breeds
- Other names: Kyloe; Long-haired Highland Cattle; Long-haired Scottish Cattle; North Highland Cattle; Scottish Cattle; Scottish Highland Cattle; West Highland Cattle
- Country of origin: United Kingdom (Scotland)
- Distribution: worldwide
- Standard: The Highland Cattle Society
- Use: meat

Traits
- Weight: Male: average: 650 kg; Female: average: 450 kg
- Height: Male: average: 125 cm; Female: average: 105 cm
- Coat: red-brown; yellow; pale/silver; dun/brindle; black
- Horn status: horned in both sexes
- Cattle; Bos (primigenius) taurus

The Highland (Scottish Gaelic: Bò Ghàidhealach) (Scots: Hieland Kye) is a Scottish breed of cattle. It originated in the Scottish Highlands and the Western Islands of Scotland and has long horns and a long shaggy coat. It is a hardy breed – often referred to as 'rustic' – able to withstand the intemperate conditions in the region. The first herd-book dates from 1885; two types – a smaller island type, usually black, and a larger mainland type, usually dun – were registered as a single breed. It is reared primarily for beef, and has been exported to several other countries.

== History ==
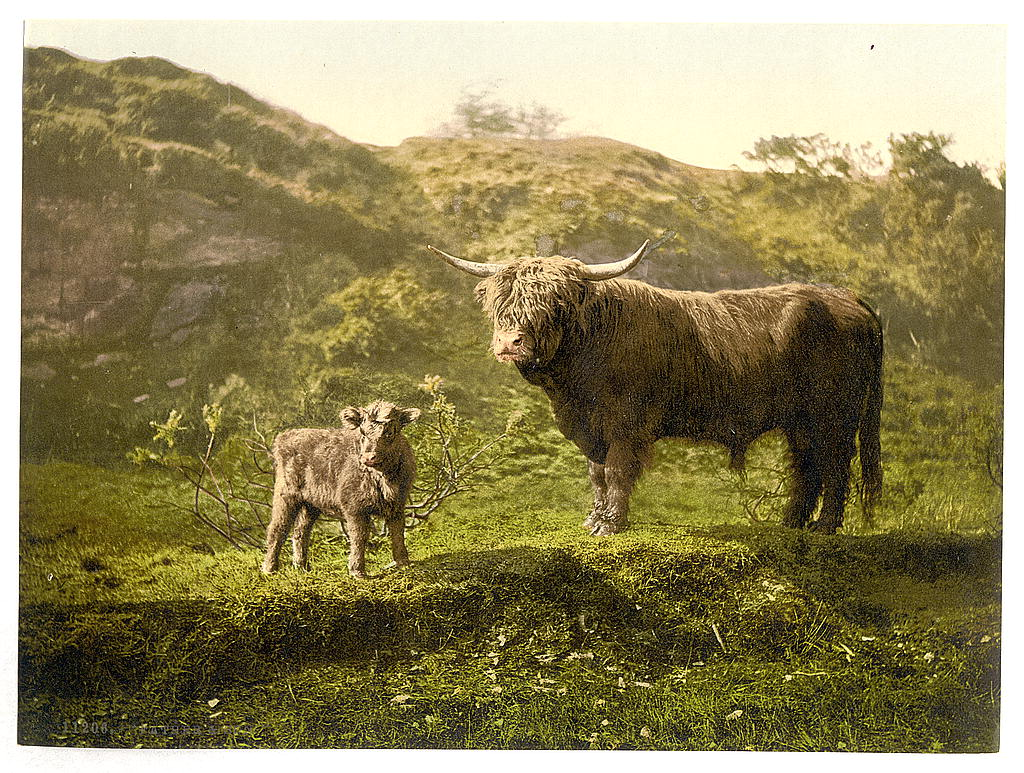
Bull and bull calf, illustration from 1890–1900

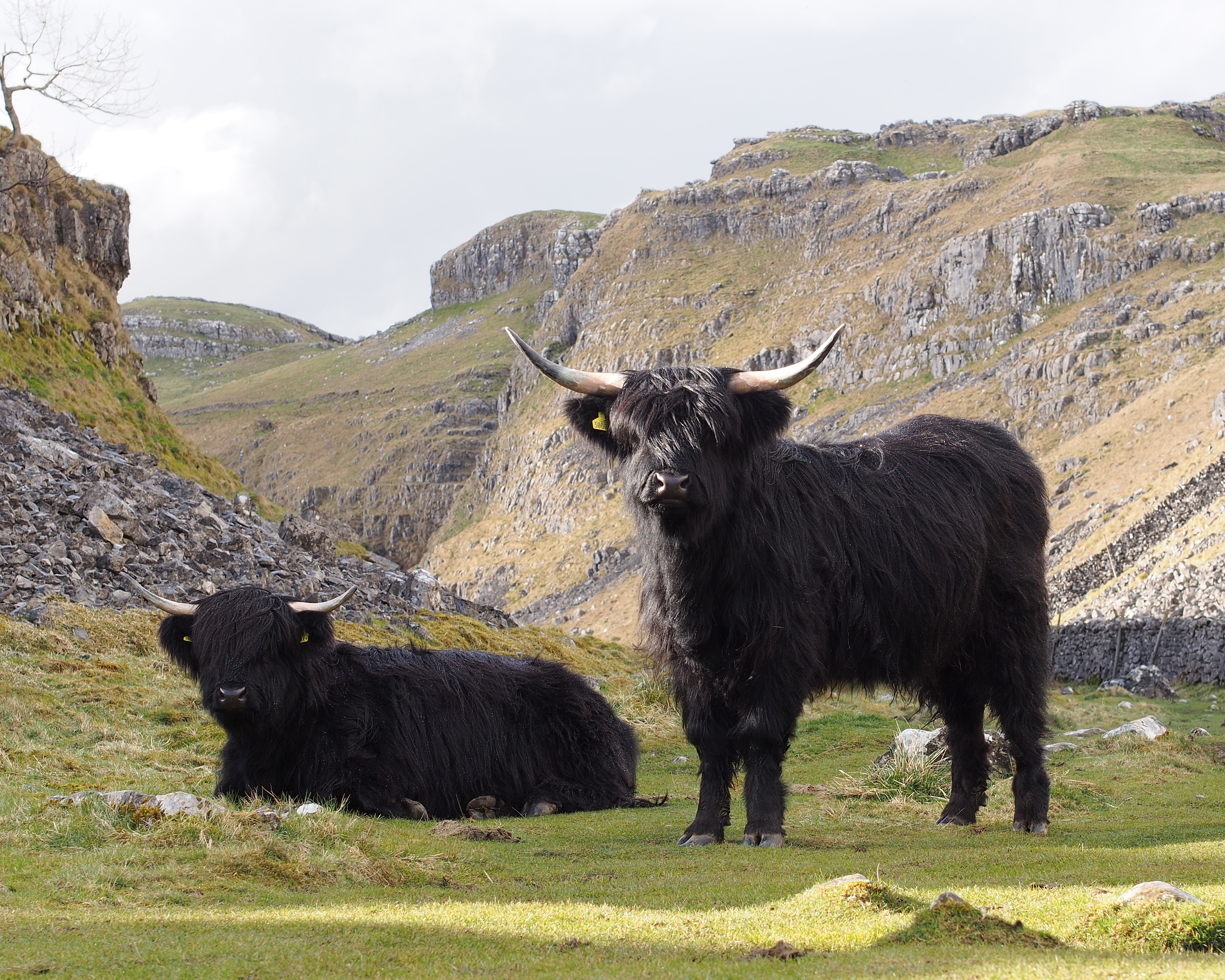
Black cows

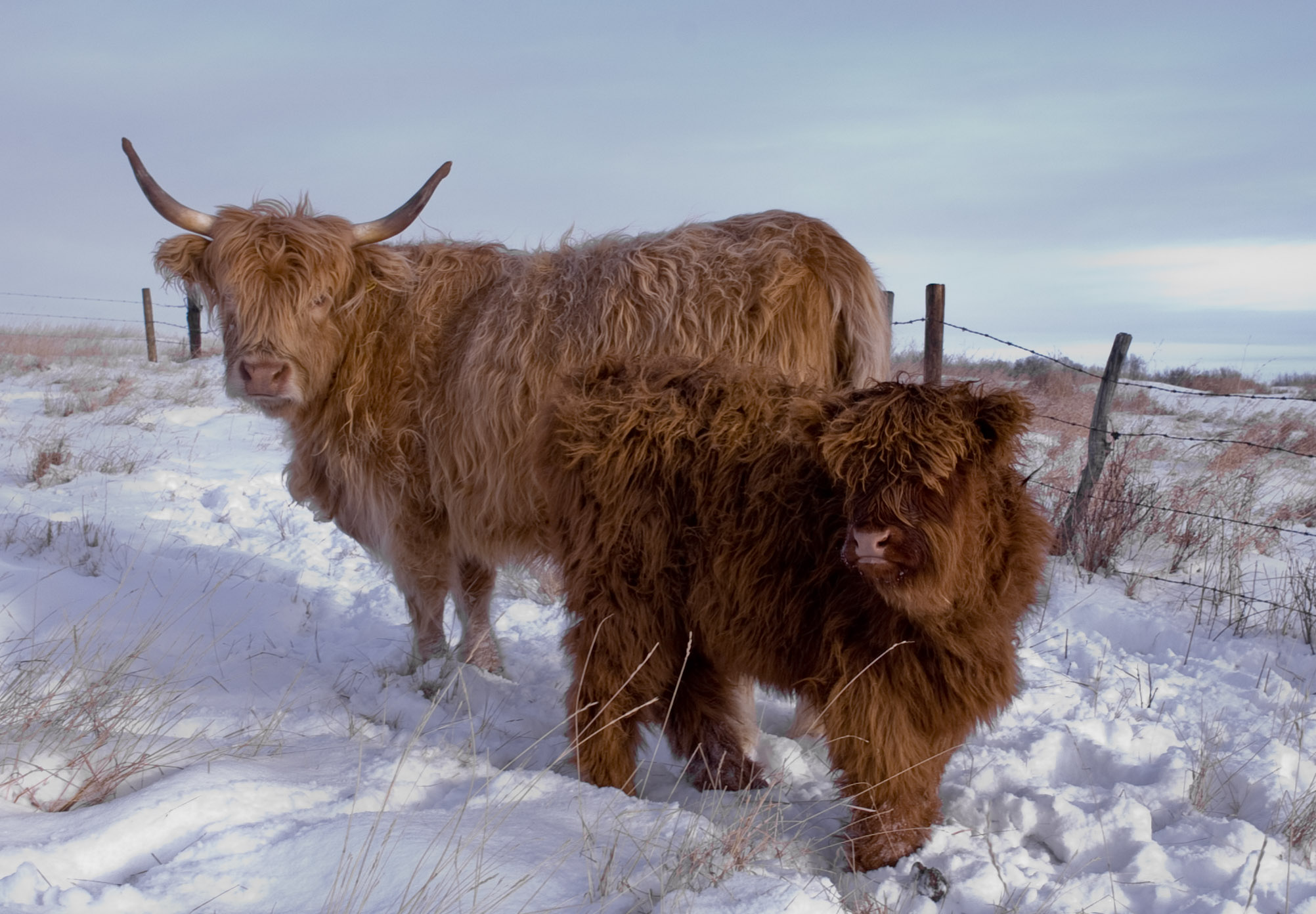
Cow and calf in south-eastern Saskatchewan

The Highland is a traditional breed of western Scotland. There were two distinct types. The Kyloe, reared mainly in the Hebrides or Western Islands, was small and was frequently black. The cattle were so called because of the practice of swimming them across the narrow straits or kyles separating the islands from the mainland. The cattle of the mainland were somewhat larger and very variable in colour; they were often brown or red.

These cattle were important to the Scottish economy of the eighteenth century. At markets such as those of Falkirk or Crieff, many were bought by drovers from England, who moved them south over the Pennines to be fattened for slaughter. In 1723, over 30000 Scottish cattle were sold into England.

A breed society was established in 1884, and in 1885 published the first volume of the herd-book. In this, the two types were recorded without distinction as 'Highland'.

In 2002, the number of registered breeding cows in the United Kingdom was about 2500; by 2012, this had risen to some 6000. In 2021, it was 3161; the conservation status of the breed in the United Kingdom is listed in DAD-IS as endangered/at risk. The number of unregistered cattle is not known.

Although a group of cattle is generally called a herd, a group of Highland cattle is known as a "fold". This is because in winter, the cattle were kept in open stone shelters called folds to protect them from the weather at night.

In 1954, Queen Elizabeth II decided to keep a herd of Highland cattle at Balmoral Castle where they are still kept today.

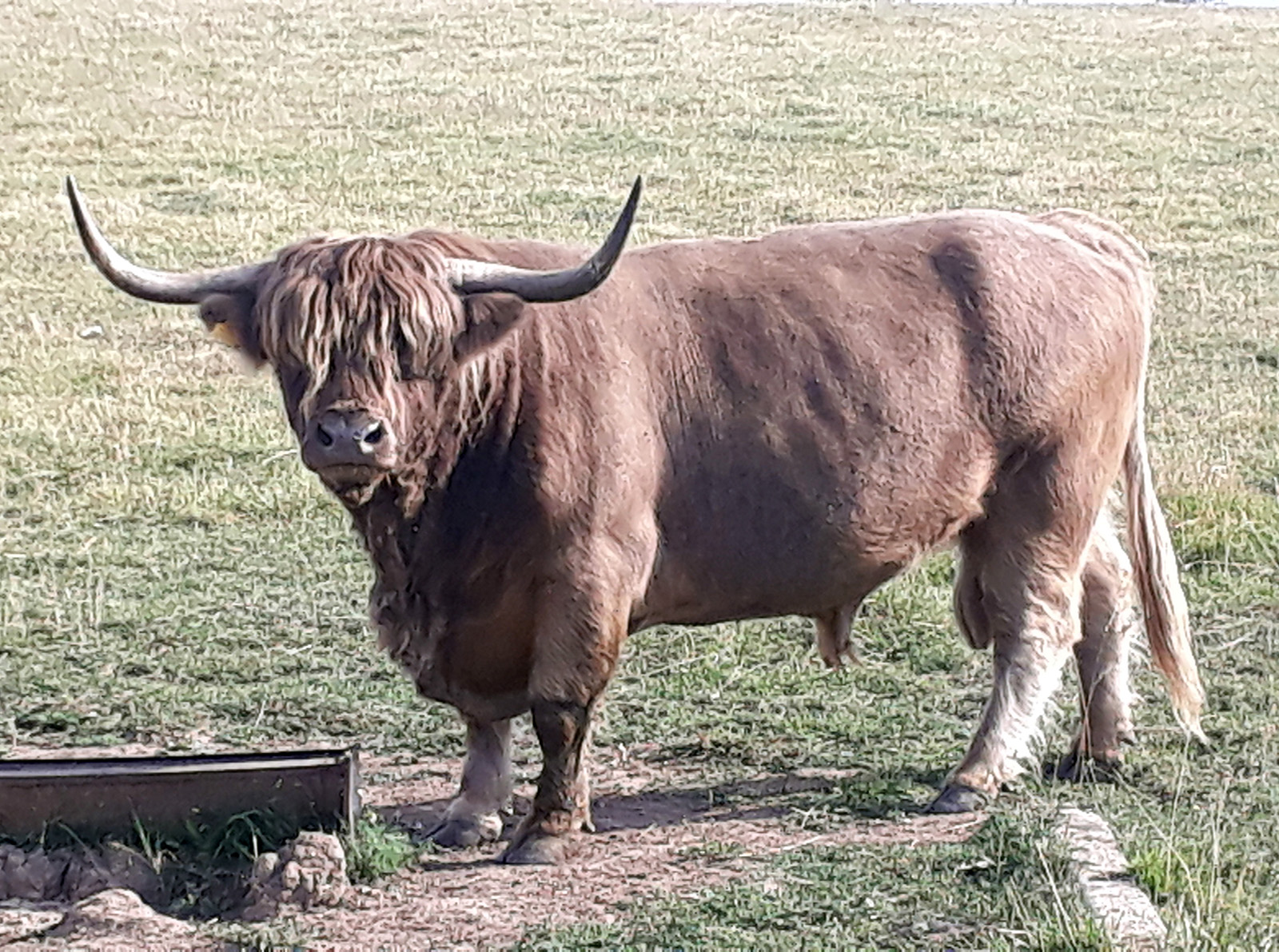
Above Širvintos, in Lithuania

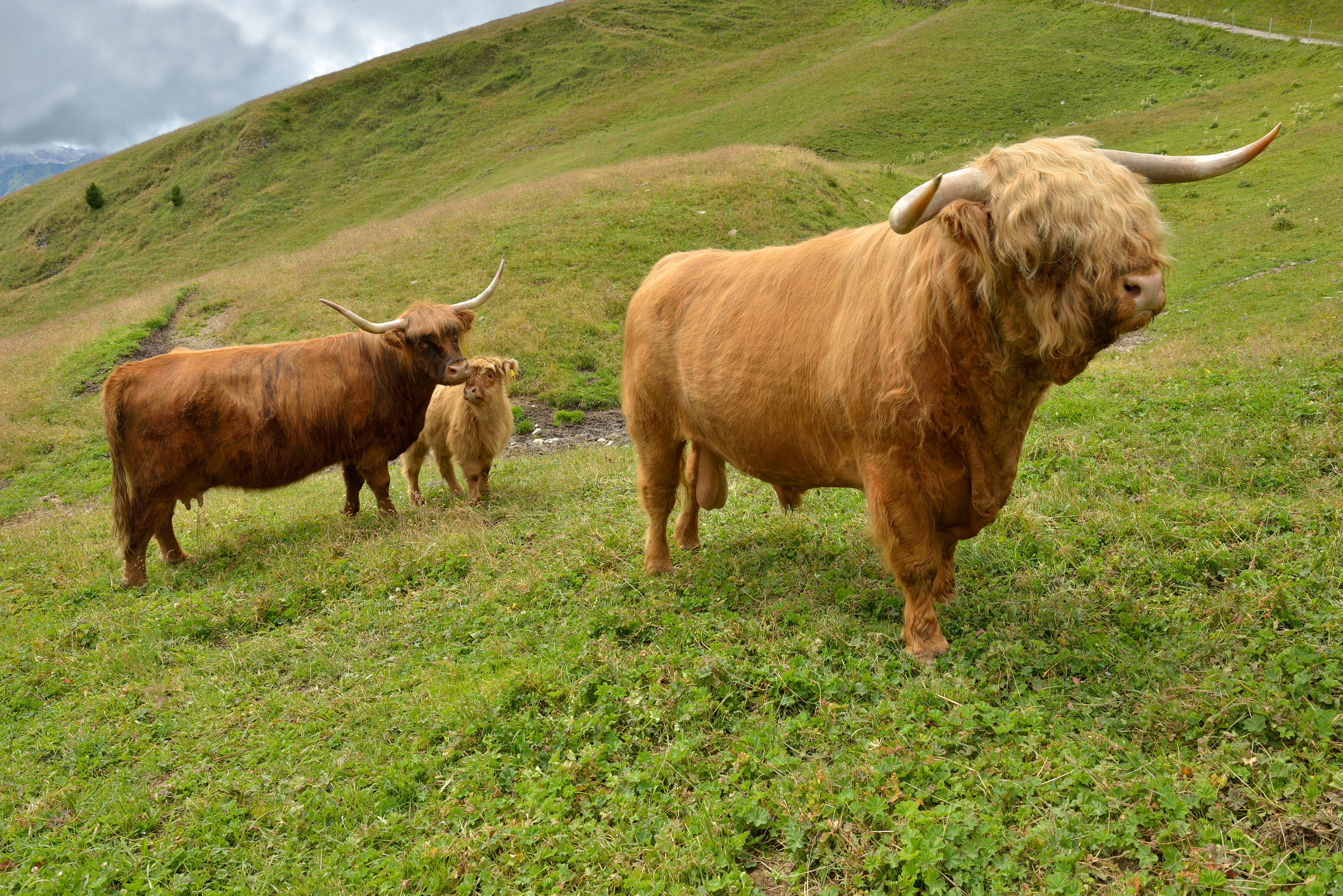
Bull, cow and calf on Seceda in the Val Gardena, in northern Italy

From the late nineteenth century, stock was exported to various countries, among them Argentina, Australia, Canada, the Falkland Islands, the former Soviet Union, and the United States. Later in the twentieth century, there were exports to various European countries. In 2022, the breed was reported to DAD-IS by twenty-three countries, of which seventeen reported population data. The total population world-wide was reported at just over 40000, with the largest numbers in France and Finland.

=== Australia ===
Scottish immigrants brought small numbers of cattle to Australia from the mid-nineteenth century, but by the late 1800s, none remained. Re-establishment of the breed began with an import of two cows and a bull from Scotland in 1954. The stock was later increased, mostly by breeding up using imported semen; some use was also made of embryo transfer. A breed society, the Australian Highland Cattle Society, was formed in 1988.

=== Canada ===
Highland cattle were first imported into Canada in the 1880s. The Hon. Donald A. Smith (later Lord Strathcona) and Robert Campbell imported one bull each to Manitoba. There were also Highland cattle in Nova Scotia in the 1880s. However, their numbers were small until the 1920s when large-scale breeding and importing began. In the 1950s cattle were imported from and exported to North America. The Canadian Highland Cattle Society was officially registered in 1964 and currently registers all purebred cattle in Canada. Towards the end of the 1990s, there was a large semen and embryo trade between the UK and Canada. However, that has stopped, largely due to the BSE (mad cow disease) outbreaks in the United Kingdom. Today, Highland cattle are mainly found in eastern Canada. In 2001, the population for Canada and the United States of America combined was estimated at 10000.

=== Denmark ===
The Danish Highland Cattle Society was established in 1987 to promote best practices in breeding and the care of Highland cattle and to promote the introduction of the breed into Denmark.

=== Finland ===
The Highland Cattle Club of Finland was founded in 1997. Their studbooks show importation of Highland cattle breeding stock to Finland, dating back to 1884. The Finnish club states that in 2016, there were 13000 Highland cattle in Finland.

=== Sweden ===
The Swedish Highland Cattle Club was founded in 1976.

Borlänge Municipality in Dalarna maintains a herd of 105 Highland Cattle for conservation grazing. The project began in 1994 when five cattle were purchased to graze restored shoreland meadows at Vassjön, a lake being restored as a wildlife habitat.

=== United States ===
The first record of Highland cattle being imported into the United States was in the late 1890s. The American Highland Cattle Association was first organised in 1948 as the American Scotch Highland Breeders Association, and now claims approximately 1100 members.

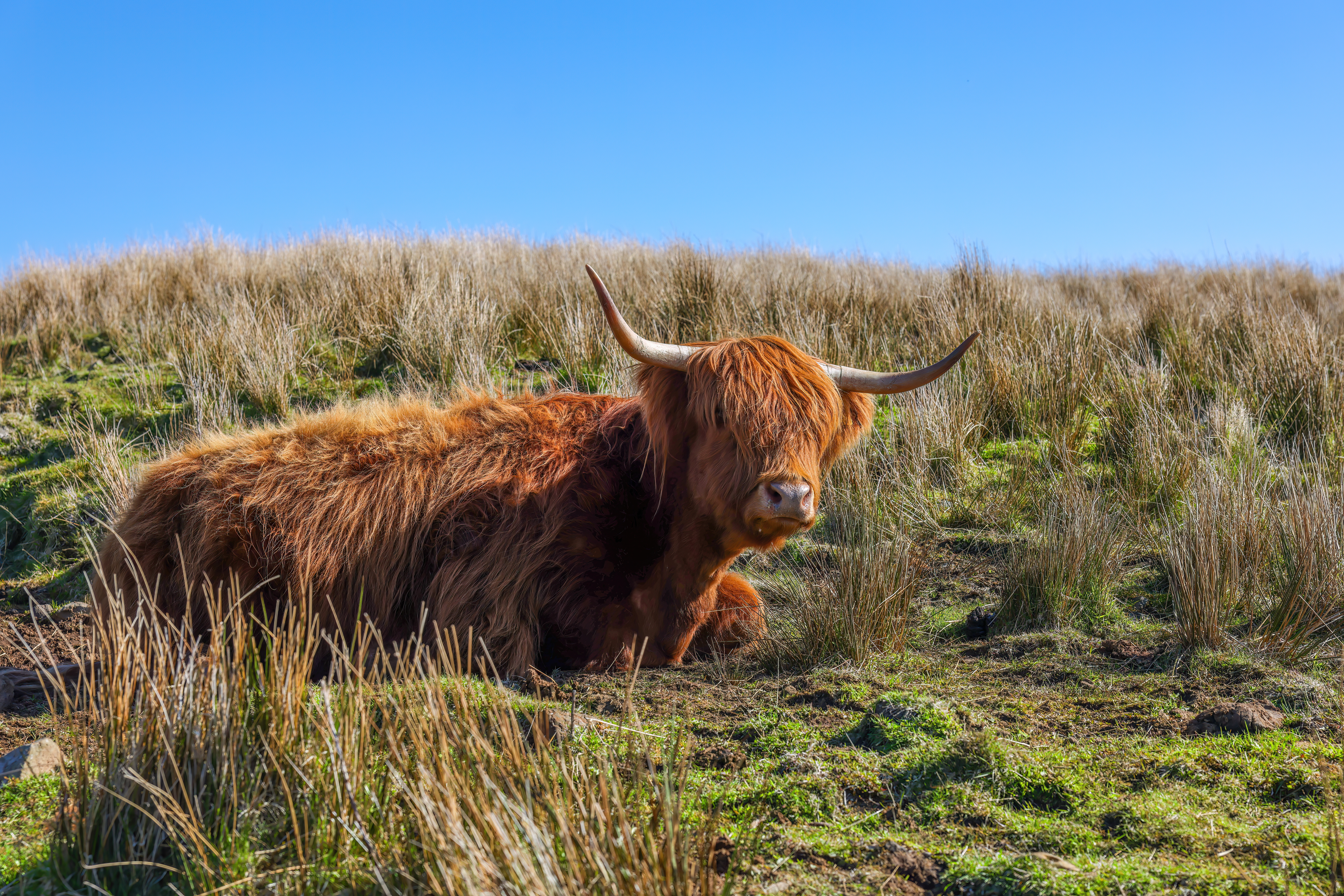
Highland cattle in Trotternish, Scotland

== Characteristics ==
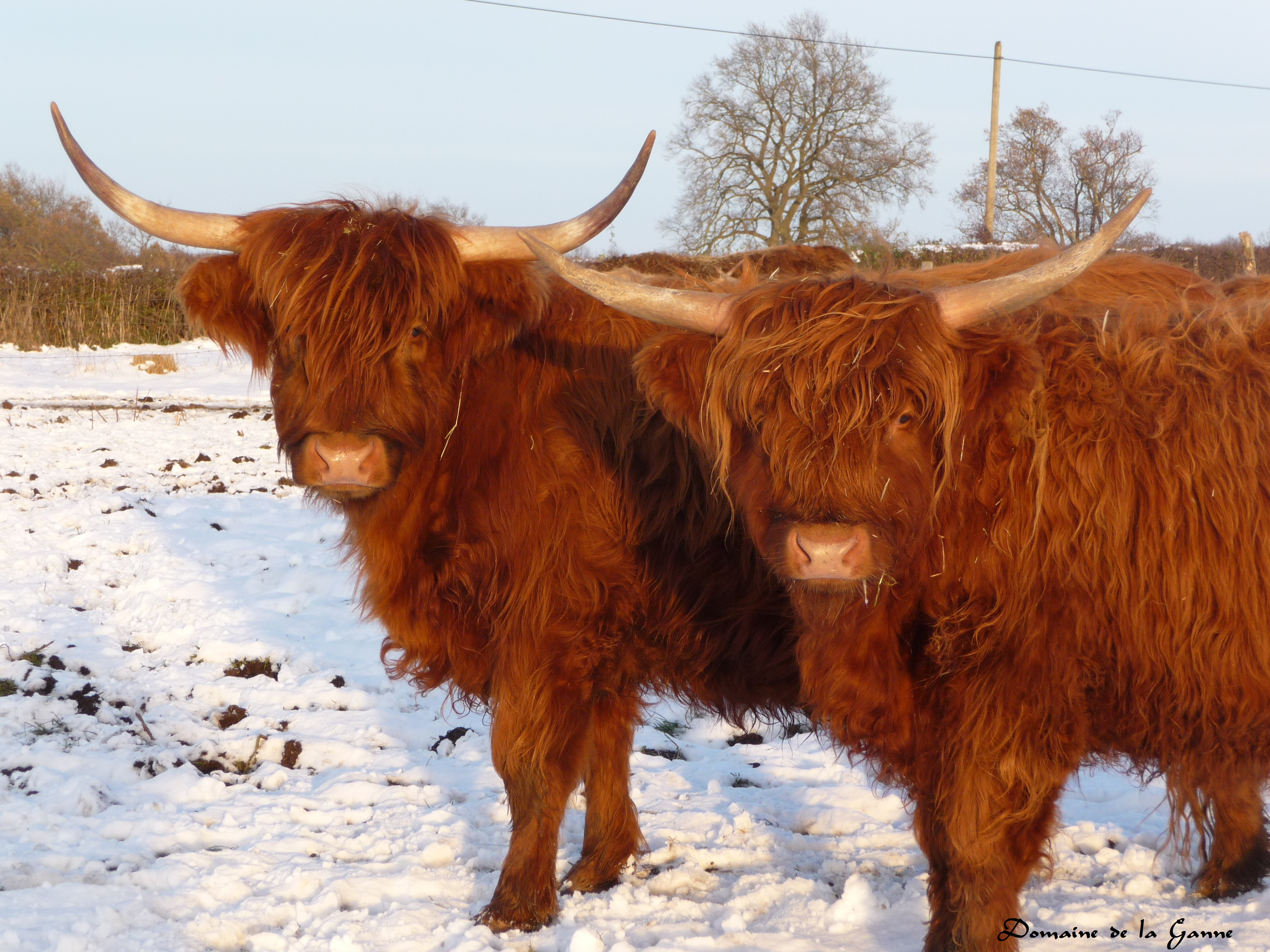
The hair gives protection during the cold winter.

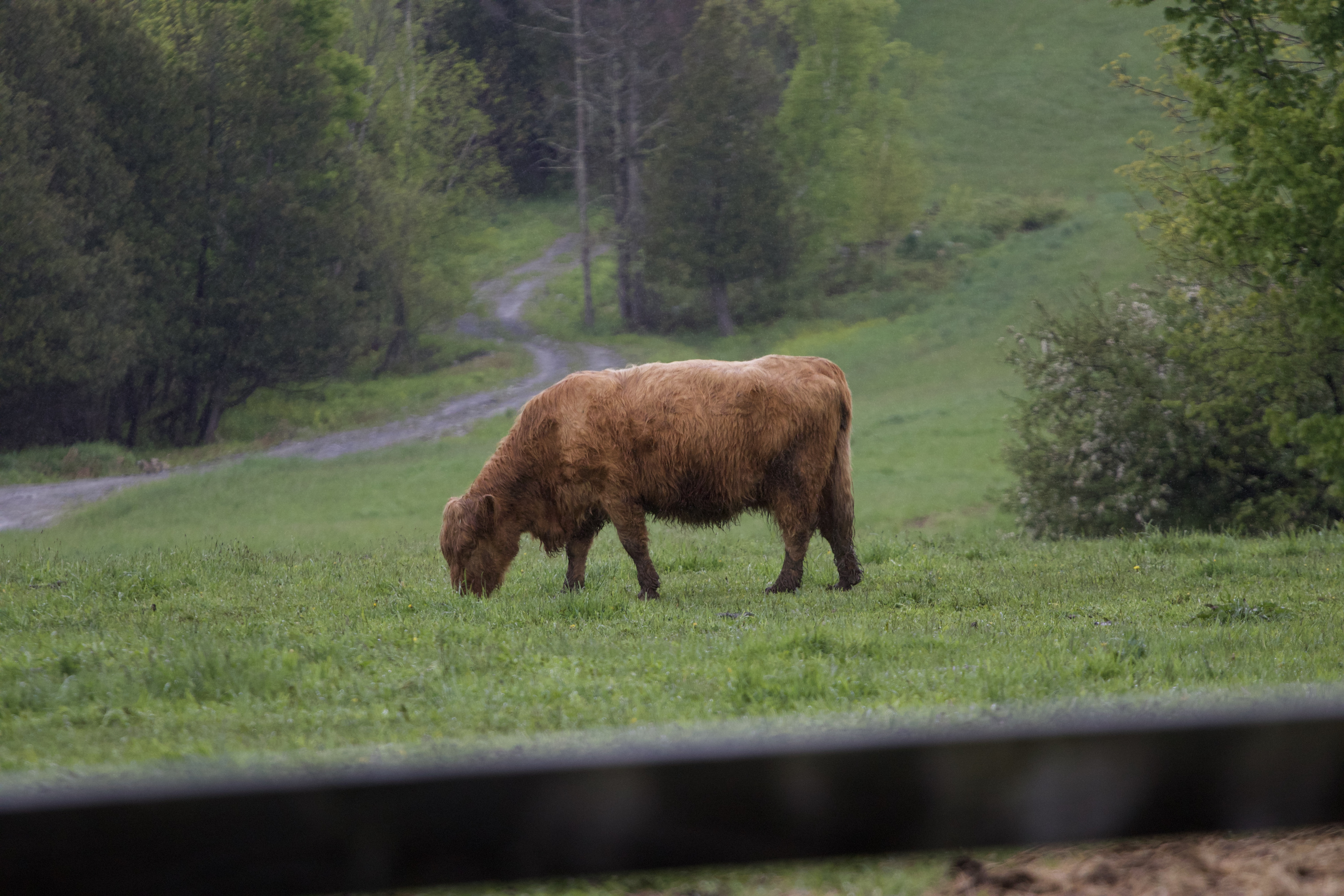
Cattle in a field in Saint-Benoît-du-Lac, Quebec

They have long, wide horns and long, wavy, woolly coats. The usual coat colour is reddish brown, seen in approximately 60% of the population; some 22% are yellow, and the remainder pale silver, black or brindle/dun. The coat colours are caused by alleles at the MC1R gene (E locus) and the PMEL or SILV gene (D locus).

They have an unusual double coat of hair. On the outside is the oily outer hair – the longest of any cattle breed – covering a downy undercoat. This makes them well suited to conditions in the Highlands, which have a high annual rainfall and sometimes very strong winds.

Mature bulls can weigh up to 800 kg (1800 lb) and heifers can weigh up to 500 kg (1100 lb). Cows typically have a height of 90–106 cm (35–42 in), and bulls are typically in the range of 106–120 cm (42–47 in). Mating occurs throughout the year with a gestation period of approximately 277–290 days. Most commonly, a single calf is born, but twins are not unknown. Sexual maturity is reached at about eighteen months. Highland cattle also have a longer expected lifespan than most other breeds of cattle, up to 20 years.

== Cold tolerance ==
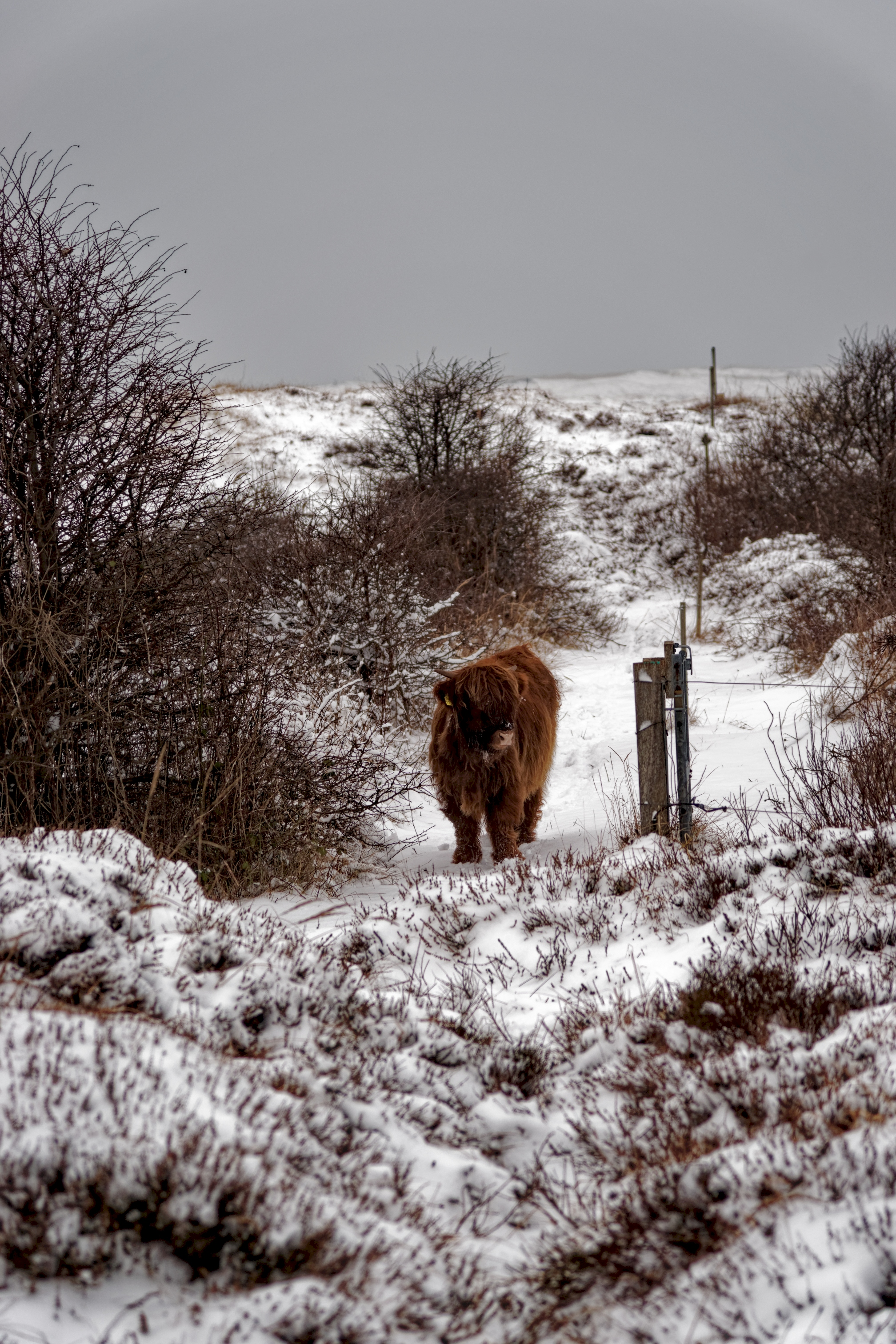
cow in the snow

All European cattle cope relatively well with low temperatures but Highland cattle have been described as "almost as cold-tolerant as the arctic-dwelling caribou and reindeer". Conversely, due to their thick coats, they are much less tolerant of heat than zebu cattle, which originated in South Asia and are adapted for hot climates. Highland cattle have been successfully established in countries where winters are substantially colder than Scotland, such as Norway and Canada.

== Social behaviour ==
A fold of semi-wild Highland cattle was studied over a period of four years. It was found that the cattle have a clear structure and hierarchy of dominance, which reduces aggression. Social standing depends on age and sex, with older cattle being dominant over calves and younger ones, and males being dominant over females. Young bulls would dominate adult cows when they reached around 2 years of age. Calves from the top-ranking cow were given a higher social status, despite minimal intervention from their mother. Playfighting, licking and mounting were seen as friendly contact.

Breeding occurred in May and June, with heifers first giving birth at 2–3 years old.

== Use ==
The meat of Highland cattle tends to be leaner than most beef because Highlands are largely insulated by their thick, shaggy hair rather than by subcutaneous fat. Highland cattle can produce beef at a reasonable profit from land that would otherwise normally be unsuitable for agriculture. The most profitable way to produce Highland beef is on poor pasture in their native land, the Highlands of Scotland.

=== Commercial success ===
Beef from Highland cattle is very tender, but demand for high-quality meat has declined. To address this decline, it is common practice to breed Highland "suckler" cows with a more favourable breed such as a Shorthorn or Limousin bull. This allows the Highland cattle to produce a crossbred beef calf that has the tender beef of its mother on a carcass shape of more commercial value at slaughter. These crossbred beef suckler cows inherit the hardiness, thrift, and mothering capabilities of their Highland dams and the improved carcass configuration of their sires. Such crossbred sucklers can be further crossbred with a modern beef bull such as a Limousin or Charolais to produce high-quality beef.
