= Revival of the woolly mammoth =

Efforts to revive the woolly mammoth

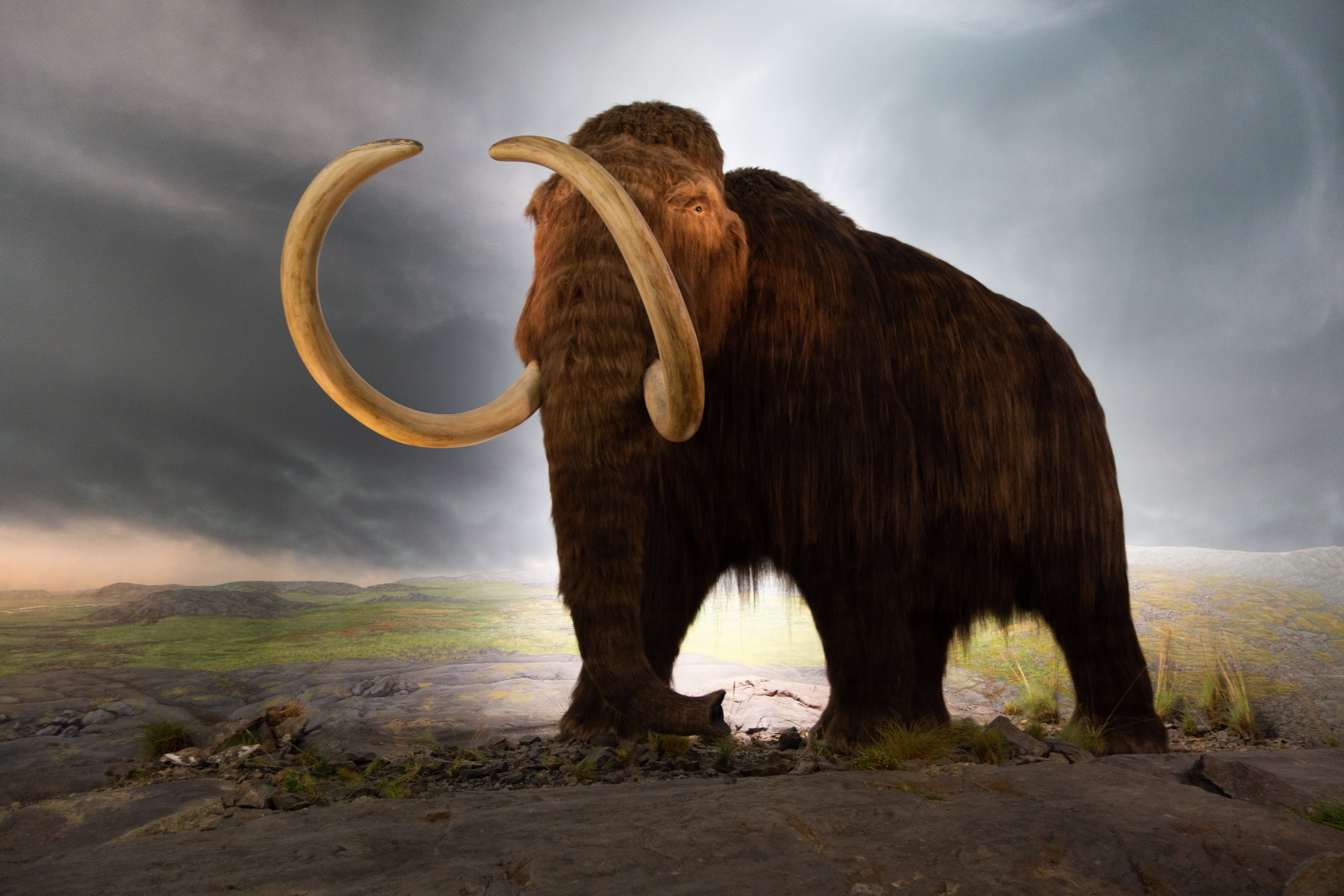
Model of a woolly mammoth at the Royal BC Museum

It has been proposed that frozen soft-tissue remains and DNA from extinct woolly mammoths could be used as a means of regenerating the species. Several methods have been suggested to achieve this goal, including cloning, artificial insemination, and genome editing. Whether or not it is ethical to create a live mammoth is debated.

== Overview ==
In theory, preserved genetic material found in remains of woolly mammoths could be used to recreate living mammoths, due to advances in molecular biology techniques and the cloning of mammals, that began with Dolly the Sheep in 1996. The cloning of mammals has improved since then but, as of 2026, no viable mammoth tissue has been found to attempt cloning.

Beth Shapiro, a scientist who has taken a central role in the sequencing of the mammoth genome, states in her 2015 book How to Clone a Mammoth: The Science of De-Extinction that a mammoth will never be cloned; at least not one that is pure mammoth. Nevertheless, the book concludes that we are likely, at some point, to see something that resembles a mammoth. Comparative genomics shows that the mammoth genome matches 99% of the elephant genome, so researchers working in the field aim to engineer an elephant with the mammoth genes which code for the external appearance and traits of a mammoth. The outcome would be an elephant-mammoth hybrid with no more than 1% mammoth genes. Separate projects are working on gradually adding mammoth genes to elephant cells in vitro.

Colossal Biosciences, founded in 2021 by George M. Church and Ben Lamm, is a biotechnology company that has publicly stated that its project is to genetically resurrect the woolly mammoth, combining its genes with Asian elephant DNA. Researchers from Colossal's primary goal when trying to revive the woolly mammoth is to improve the environment and mitigate climate change. It has publicly stated that it intends to have its first calf in 2028.

== Cloning ==
Cloning involves removal of the DNA-containing nucleus of the egg cell of a female elephant, and replacement with a nucleus from woolly mammoth tissue, a process called somatic cell nuclear transfer. For example, Akira Iritani, at the Kyoto University in Japan, reportedly planned to do this. The cell would then be stimulated into dividing, and implanted in a female elephant. The resulting calf would have the genes of the woolly mammoth. However, nobody as of date has found a viable mammoth cell to begin the cloning process, and most scientists doubt that any living cell could have survived freezing in the tundra of the Arctic. Because of their conditions of preservation, the DNA of frozen mammoths has deteriorated significantly over the millennia.

== Artificial insemination ==
A second method involves artificially inseminating an elephant egg cell with sperm cells from a frozen woolly mammoth carcass. The resulting offspring would be an elephant–mammoth hybrid, and the process would have to be repeated, so more hybrids could be used in breeding. After several generations of cross-breeding these hybrids, an almost pure woolly mammoth would be produced. Whether the hybrid embryo would be carried through the two-year gestation is unknown; in one case, an Asian elephant and an African elephant produced a live calf named Motty, but it died of defects at less than two weeks old. Additionally, sperm cells of modern mammals are viable for 15 years at most after deep-freezing. This makes this method unfeasible.

== Gene editing ==
In April 2015, Swedish scientists published the complete genome (nuclear DNA sequence) of the woolly mammoth. Several projects are working on gradually replacing the genes in elephant cells with mammoth genes. One such project is that of Harvard University geneticist George M. Church, who is funded by the Long Now Foundation, is attempting to create a mammoth–elephant hybrid using DNA from frozen mammoth carcasses. According to the researchers, a mammoth cannot be recreated, but they will try to eventually grow a hybrid elephant with some woolly mammoth traits in an artificial womb. In 2017, George Church said "Actually it would be more like an elephant with a number of mammoth traits. We're not there yet, but it could happen in a couple of years." The creature, sometimes referred as a "mammophant", would be partly elephant, but with features such as small ears, subcutaneous fat, long shaggy hair and cold-adapted blood. The Harvard University team is attempting to study the animals' characteristics in vitro by replacing or editing some specific mammoth genes into Asian elephant skin cells called fibroblasts that have the potential to become embryonic stem cells. By March 2015 and using the new CRISPR DNA editing technique, Church's team had some woolly mammoth genes edited into the genome of an Asian elephant; focusing on cold-resistance initially, the target genes are for the external ear size, subcutaneous fat, hemoglobin, and hair attributes. By February 2017, Church's team had made 45 substitutions to the elephant genome. So far, his work focuses solely on single cells. In 2021, Church received $15 million in funding and spun off a new company called Colossal Biosciences. In 2025, Colossal Biosciences showcased three mice with woolly mammoth-inspired traits, such as cold tolerance, woolly coats, golden-brown fur, and curly whiskers as a proof of concept to engineering the woolly mammoth's traits into the Asian elephant.

The Mammoth Genome Project at Pennsylvania State University is also researching the modification of African elephant DNA to create a mammoth–elephant hybrid. If a viable hybrid embryo is obtained by gene editing procedures, implanting it into a female Asian elephant housed in a zoo may be possible, but with the current knowledge and technology, whether the hybrid embryo would be carried through the two-year gestation is unknown.

== Ethics ==
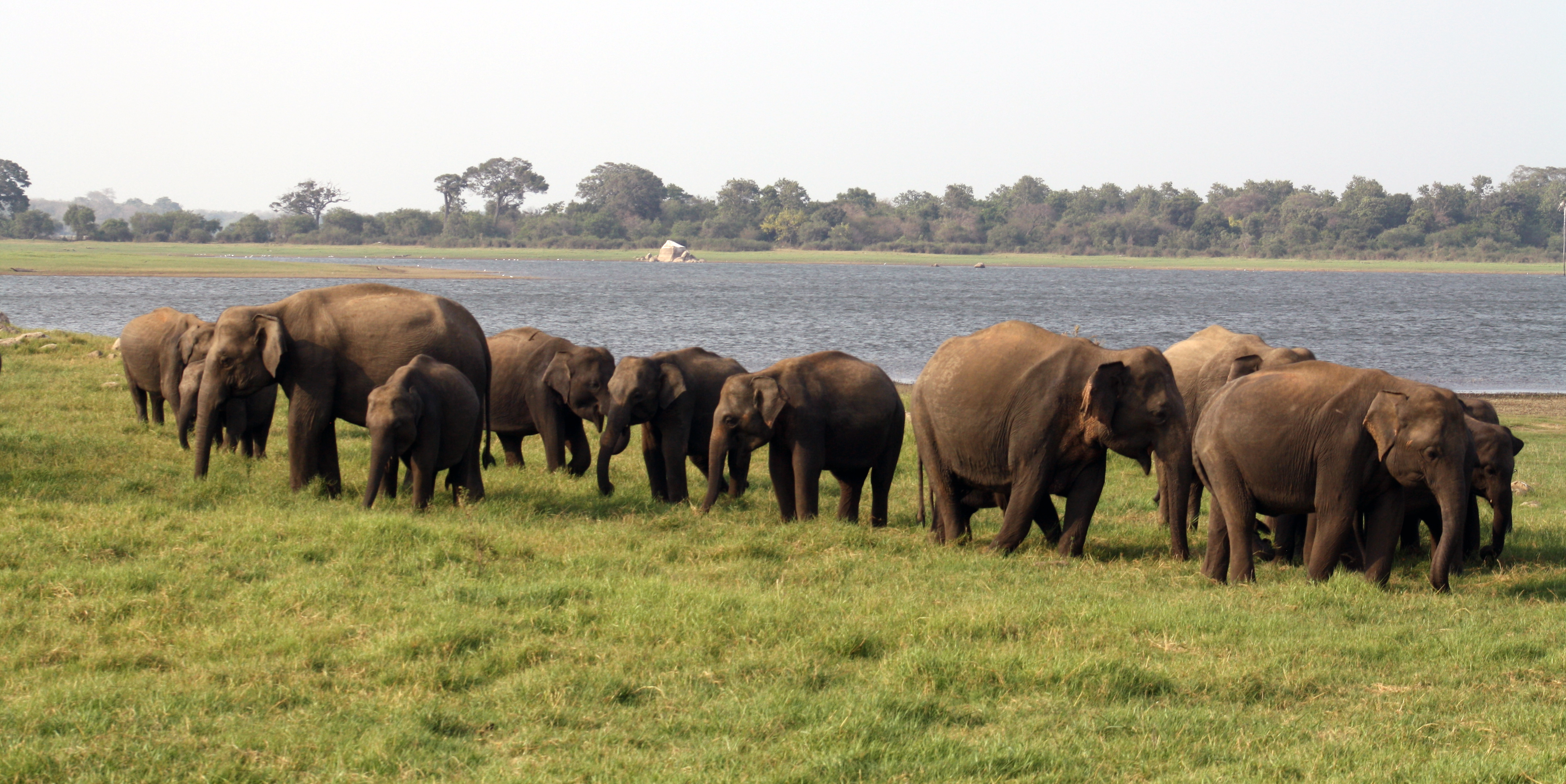
Modern elephants are highly gregarious, as shown by these Sri Lankan elephants

A variety of ethical and legal considerations have been described in connection with efforts to revive the mammoth, from potential health, safety and environmental concerns, to possible moral and religious objections, to technical implications under existing legal regimes. For example, if any method is ever successful, a suggestion has been made to introduce the hybrids to a wildlife reserve in Siberia called the Pleistocene Park, but some biologists question the ethics of such recreation attempts. In addition to the technical problems, not much habitat is left that would be suitable for mammoth–elephant hybrids. Because both species are [were] social and gregarious, creating a few specimens would not be ideal. The time and resources required would be enormous, and the scientific benefits would be unclear, suggesting these resources should instead be used to preserve extant elephant species which are endangered. The ethics of using elephants as surrogate mothers in hybridisation attempts has also been questioned, as most embryos would not survive, and knowing the exact needs of a hybrid mammoth–elephant calf would be impossible.

== See also ==
- De-extinction
- Quagga Project
- Tauros Programme
