= VGP =

VGP may refer to:

- VGP JSC, a Ukrainian manufacturer of sanitary paper products
- VGP Universal Kingdom, an amusement park in Chennai, Tamil Nadu, India
- Vermont Green Party
- Vertebrate Genomes Project
- Verlagsgruppe Passau, a German publishing company; see Deník
- Vessels General Permit, related to ship pollution in the United States
- Virtual Geomagnetic Pole, see plate reconstruction
