= Uruz =

Uruz may refer to:

- Ur (rune), the reconstructed Proto-Germanic name of the Elder Futhark u rune ᚢ (*Ūruz with the meaning ″aurochs, wild ox″)
- Uruz Project, a European project to breed back the extinct aurochs
