= How to Clone a Mammoth =

2015 popular science book by Beth Shapiro

How to Clone a Mammoth: The Science of De-Extinction
- Cover for How to Clone a Mammoth
- Author: Beth Shapiro
- Subject: Resurrection biology, paleontology, conservation biology
- Genre: Non-fiction
- Publisher: Princeton University Press
- Publication date: April 6, 2015
- Pages: 240
- Awards: 2016 PROSE Award in Popular Science & Popular Mathematics, Association of American Publishers * 2016 AAAS/Subaru SB&F Prize for Excellence in Science Books, Young Adult Science Books * 2015 Los Angeles Times Book Prize in Science & Technology Finalist
- ISBN: 978-0691157054

How to Clone a Mammoth: The Science of De-Extinction is a 2015 non-fiction book by biologist Beth Shapiro and published by Princeton University Press. The book describes the current state of de-extinction technology and what the processes involved require in order to accomplish the potential resurrection of extinct species.

== Content ==
The book is laid out as a step-by-step guide on how to clone an animal, with each chapter detailing a different topic that needs to be explored and answered before de-extinction of a species will be complete. This also involves a particular focus on resurrection of the mammoth.

Several chapters deal with the genetic material itself and how to obtain it, along with the difficulties of recovering viable DNA samples from mummified or fossilized remains. Due to the actions of nucleases after cell death, most DNA of extinct species is fragmented into small pieces that have to be reconstructed at least partially if it is to be cloned. This fragmentation means that recovery of a full extinct genome is largely impossible. Thus, only partial genes can be utilized and the most viable method is to use a close evolutionary relative of the extinct species and insert the genes that differ into an embryo of the living species. For mammoth de-extinction, any trait consideration would involve the Asian elephant, the closest still-living relative. Using genes from extrapolated mammoth DNA, the Asian elephant could be made to survive across a wider range, including cold environments, protecting it against possible extinction. This gene transfer to benefit living species is one of the primary sources of research done with de-extinction technology in addition to the desire to revive lost species.

Three following chapters discuss current technology available for moving genes and creating modified elephant genomes, including CRISPR (Clustered Regularly Interspersed Short Palindromic Repeats) and TALENS (Transcription Activator-like Effector Nucleases). The final chapters discuss the environmental benefits and potential drawbacks of mammoths or other extinct species being reintroduced. For mammoths specifically, their heavy weight and specific methods of foraging help grasslands grow in colder climates, potentially turning Siberian permafrost into a tundra-like region with numerous plant species.

== Style and tone ==
Shaoni Bhattacharya in New Scientist noted that while the book "can be a little academic", Shapiro manages to explain "complex molecular biology clearly" and that it "really comes alive, though, when she describes her own expeditions". Writing for National Geographic, Riley Black describes Shapiro's writing style as "sharp, witty, and impeccably-argued" and says that she writes "finely-honed prose" that "cuts through the hype that has clouded the debate" on whether it is possible to clone extinct animals and also whether such efforts should instead be directed toward assisting species that are currently in danger of extinction. Caspar Henderson for The Spectator called the book's writing "lively, skeptical and nuanced" and stated that Shapiro covered topics with "great clarity". In an article for Science, A. Rus Hoelzel characterized the writing as "rich in anecdote and scientifically precise".

== Critical reception ==
Alec Rodriguez praised the book's writing in a Yale Scientific article, approving of the conciseness and yet approachable technical detail that is included in the book while still remaining smooth in its flow between subjects. Rodriguez concluded that the book also "leaves the reader optimistic" in regards to future scientific advancements and the usage of Pleistocene Park. Times Higher Education's Tiffany Taylor considered the work a "thought-provoking book [that] offers excitement and wonder" and that, through Shapiro's writing and direct discussion, the book manages to "paint a scientifically accurate yet magical world where Pleistocene giants might roam the Arctic tundra once again, and where we have the chance to undo some past mistakes". A review in Publishers Weekly applauded the book's attempt to state plainly the science involved and determined that readers will "emerge with the ability to think more deeply about the facts of de-extinction and cloning at a time when hyperbolic and emotionally manipulative claims about such scientific breakthroughs are all too common". Kent H. Redford in the journal Oryx recommended that others read the book, adding that it "will make everyone think, will make some mad, others inspired, and hopefully will educate all conservationists to the extraordinary potential opportunities, good and bad, that de-extinction presents". In The Quarterly Review of Biology, Derek D. Turner called the writing "careful, accessible, and thoughtful", while also pointing out that the book as a whole "conveys a sense of excitement about the science, but without the uncritical techno-optimism that one sees in many popular articles". Philip J. Seddon in an article for the journal Trends in Ecology and Evolution described the book as an "important contribution to the ongoing debate" by how it changed the focus on what de-extinction is about to "ecological resurrection, and not species resurrection".
