= Andrew Pask =

Australian epigeneticist

Professor Andrew John Pask is an epigeneticist and head of the Thylacine Integrated Genomic Restoration Research (TIGRR) Laboratory at the School of BioSciences in the University of Melbourne. He is known for his work on the project to resurrect the extinct thylacine, a marsupial colloquially known as the "Tasmanian tiger". In 2017 Pask and his team released the thylacine genome.

== Biography ==
Pask graduated with a PhD from La Trobe University in 1999, for his thesis "The evolution of genes in the sex determining pathway". He joined the University of Melbourne in 1999 as an Associate Professor and Reader, and was appointed Professor in 2018.

In August 2025, Pask joined Colossal Biosciences as Chief Biology Officer to lead the company's growing research effort in Australia.

On 6 June 2025 Pask delivered a TEDxSydney Talk: Bringing Back the Past to Preserve the Future.

== Recent Scholarly work ==
- Harnessing reproductive biology to conserve wildlife species. DOI: 10.1071/RD26022
- Convergent evolution of scavenger cell development at brain borders DOI: 10.1038/s41586-025-10003-3
- Dunnart neonates actively climb to the pouch after birth. DOI: 10,1098/rsos.251970
- De-extinction: how reviving the past is revolutionizing the future of conservation biology: 10.1262/jrd.2026-02
- Heterochronic limb patterning in marsupials reveals flexibitity in the processes underlying lateral plate mesoderm morphogenesis. DOI: 10.1126/sciadv.aed3192

== Awards ==
2015 Australian Research Council Future Fellowship.
