= Colossal Biosciences =

American biotechnology company

Colossal Biosciences Inc.
- Colossal Biosciences logo
- Type: Private
- Industry: Biotechnology
- Founded: 2021; 5 years ago
- Founders: George Church; Ben Lamm
- Headquarters: Dallas, Texas, U.S.
- Key people: Ben Lamm (CEO); Beth Shapiro (CSO); Andrew Pask (Chief biology officer)
- Total equity: 10.2B USD
- Number of employees: 170 (2025)
- Website: colossal.com

Colossal Biosciences Inc. is an American biotechnology and genetic engineering company working to de-extinct several extinct animals, including the woolly mammoth, the Tasmanian tiger, the dire wolf, the dodo, the moa and the bluebuck. In 2023, it stated that it wants to have woolly mammoth hybrid calves by 2028, and wants to reintroduce them to the Arctic tundra habitat. Likewise, it launched the Tasmanian Thylacine Advisory Committee, a thylacine research project to release Tasmanian tiger joeys back to their original Tasmanian and broader Australian habitat after a period of observation in captivity.

The company develops genetic engineering and reproductive technology for conservation biology. It was founded in 2021 by Harvard geneticist George Church and billionaire entrepreneur Ben Lamm. It is based in Dallas, Texas.

== History ==
=== Foundation ===
In a 2008 interview with The New York Times, George Church first expressed his interest in engineering a hybrid Asian elephant-mammoth by sequencing the woolly mammoth genome. In 2012, Church was part of a team that pioneered the CRISPR-Cas9 gene editing tool, through which the potential for altering genetic code to engineer the envisioned "mammophant" surfaced. Church presented a talk at the National Geographic Society in 2013, where he mapped out the idea of Colossal.

Church and his genetics team used CRISPR to copy mammoth genes into the genome of an Asian elephant in 2015. That same year, Church's lab integrated mammoth genes into the DNA of elephant skin cells; the lab zeroed in on 60 genes that experiments hypothesized as being important to the distinctive traits of mammoths, such as a high-domed skull, ability to hold oxygen at low temperatures, and fatty tissue. Church's lab reported in 2017 that it had successfully added 45 genes to the genome of an Asian elephant.

In 2019, Ben Lamm, a serial entrepreneur, contacted Church to meet at his lab in Boston. Lamm was intrigued by press reports of Church's de-extinction idea.

=== Launch ===
Colossal was officially launched on September 13, 2021. The launch included a $15 million seed round led by Thomas Tull, Tim Draper, Tony Robbins, Winklevoss Capital Management, Breyer Capital, and Richard Garriott. In addition to the de-extinction of the woolly mammoth, Colossal, in partnership with Dr. Paul Ling of Baylor College of Medicine, hopes to develop a vaccine to the elephant endotheliotropic herpesvirus, a virus which infects and kills many young Asian elephants.

Colossal also announced that the company's mission was to preserve endangered animals through gene-editing technology and use those same animals to reshape ecosystems to combat biodiversity loss.

The company's genomic modeling software development could potentially bring forth advancements in disease treatment, multiplexed genetic engineering, synthetic biology, and biotechnology. Colossal recruited mammoth and modern elephant experts Michael Hofreiter and Fritz Vollrath, as well as bioethicists R. Alta Charo and S. Matthew Liao for their consultation. Other scientific advisory board members include: Carolyn Bertozzi, Austin Gallagher, Kenneth Lacovara, Helen Hobbs, David Haussler, Elazar Edelman, Joseph DeSimone, Erez Lieberman Aiden, Christopher E. Mason, and Doris Taylor. Colossal's team includes over 170 scientists and 95 advisors that specialize in fields such as genomics, paleontology and conservation.

In October 2021, Colossal announced its partnership with VGP; through this collaboration, Colossal will provide funding for VGP to sequence and assemble Asian, African bush, and African forest elephant genomes for preservation purposes. These genomes were made publicly accessible for research without use restrictions in July 2022 and May 2023, respectively.

In March 2022, Colossal raised $60 million in a Series A funding round led by Thomas Tull, bringing the total funding to $75 million. Other participants in this funding were Untamed Planet, Animoca Brands, Breyer Capital, Animal Capital, Arch Ventures co-founder Robert Nelsen, Paris Hilton, Bold Capital, First Light Capital Group, Boost VC, Jazz Ventures, Builders VC, Green Sands Equity, Draper Associates, and Charles Hoskinson.

Colossal spun out its software platform, Form Bio, in September 2022 with $30 million in funding. Lamm has stated that Colossal is run like a software company, and monetization will stem from technologies developed by the company. Form Bio has developed an AI-based software platform designed to help scientists manage large and complicated datasets.

In January 2023, Colossal completed a Series B funding round, raising an additional $150 million and putting the company's valuation at over $1 billion. The same month, Colossal launched its Conservation Advisory Board, which includes Forrest Galante, Iain Douglas-Hamilton, Mead Treadwell, and Aurelia Skipwith as its members.

In October 2024, Colossal announced $50 million in funding for its launch of the Colossal Foundation.

The company secured $200 million in Series C funding in January 2025, bringing its total valuation to $10.2 billion and making it Texas' first decacorn. With the new funding, Colossal announced its intention to expand its work in artificial wombs and de-extinction species. As of January 2025, Colossal has raised $435 million in total funding since its foundation.

In August 2025, Colossal announced, Colossal Australia, its first expansion outside the United States with its acquisition of the Thylacine Integrated Genomics Restoration Research Lab (TIGRR) at the University of Melbourne. The lab is led by the well-known Australian scientist, and Colossal chief biology officer, Andrew Pask.

In November 2025, Colossal announced that it had acquired animal cloning company Viagen.

== Science and technology ==
Colossal is the first company to apply CRISPR technology to species restoration efforts. Its lab pairs CRISPR/Cas9 with other DNA-editing enzymes, such as integrases, recombinases, and deaminases, to splice woolly mammoth genes into the Asian elephant, and has "used 65 different mammoth genomes across about 700,000 years to create an assembled ancient DNA genome".

In July 2022, VGP and Colossal announced that they successfully sequenced the entire Asian elephant genome; this was the first time that mammalian genetic code had been fully sequenced to a detailed level since the Human Genome Project was completed in the early 2000s.

Breaking, a plastic degradation and synthetic biology startup, was developed inside Colossal and launched in April 2024. The startup discovered X-32, a microbe that is capable of breaking down various plastics in as little as 22 months while leaving behind carbon dioxide, water and biomass.

It was reported in 2024 that Colossal successfully produced the first-ever elephant and dunnart iPSCs.

The Colossal Biovault collects tissue samples of endangered species in hopes to allow cell lines to become accessible and stored in domestic partner facilities. Its first projects included the Sumatran rhinoceros, the red wolf, the northern quoll, the northern white rhinoceros, the pink pigeon, the tooth-billed pigeon, the Victorian grassland earless dragon, the vaquita, the African bush elephant, the African forest elephant, the Asian elephant, and the ivory-billed woodpecker. In addition to these species, Colossal planned to biobank the "top 100 most imperilled" species on their Colossal 100 list. However, this list has not been publicly disclosed.

In October 2024, the company announced that it had rebuilt a 99.9% accurate genome of the thylacine, using a "pickled" 110-year-old fossilized Tasmanian tiger skull. This marks "the most complete ancient genome of any species known to date" and provides a full DNA blueprint to potentially bring back the Tasmanian tiger. Three months later, in January 2025, the company sequenced the complete genome of the Tasmanian tiger; Colossal also made a prototype for an artificial uterus and used that to culture fertilized single-cell marsupial embryos to over halfway through pregnancy.

In March 2025, Colossal announced the creation of gene-edited "woolly mice" with mutations inspired by woolly mammoths, touting it as a step toward engineering mammoth-like Asian elephants. The mice, which exhibit long, shaggy, tawny-toned fur, were developed using a mix of mammoth-like and known mouse hair-growth mutations. Some experts expressed skepticism, arguing that the experiment was more about mouse genetics than a breakthrough in de-extinction. The company stated that it planned further studies on the mice's cold tolerance and long-term health but had no commercial breeding plans.

In April 2025, the Colossal Biosciences Dire Wolf Project was announced, which used cloning and gene-editing to birth three genetically modified wolf pups: six-month-old males Romulus and Remus and two-month-old female Khaleesi. In-house scientists analyzed the dire wolf genome, extracted from two ancient samples – a 13,000-year-old tooth and a 72,000-year-old ear bone. After comparing the genomes of gray wolves and dire wolves to identify the genetic differences responsible for the dire wolf's distinctive features, Colossal isolated EPC cells from gray wolf blood samples before rewriting 14 key genes in the cell's nucleus to express 20 traits claimed to represent the dire wolf phenotype. Overall, the work was less invasive than the typical cloning process. Colossal scientists produced 45 engineered ova, which developed into embryos and inserted into the wombs of two surrogate hound mixes. Colossal claims that these minor genetic modifications effectively revived dire wolves as a species, though "no ancient dire wolf DNA was actually spliced into the gray wolf's genome".

Independent experts disagreed with Colossal Biosciences' claim that these animals are revived dire wolves, stating that they are "not a dire wolf under any definition of a species ever". The IUCN Species Survival Commission Canid Specialist Group officially declared that the three animals are neither dire wolves nor proxies of the dire wolves based on the IUCN SSC guiding principles on creating proxies of extinct species for conservation benefit. They commented that creating phenotypic proxies doesn't change the conservation status of an extinct species and may instead threaten the extant species such as grey wolves. Therefore, since the claimed proxies do not conform with the IUCN SSC guidelines, have no ecological niche left today and "will not restore ecosystem function", they concluded that the Colossal Biosciences' project "does not contribute to conservation." Colossal Biosciences released a clarifying document Alignment of Colossal’s Dire Wolf De-Extinction Project with IUCN SSC Guiding Principles in response.

In May 2025, the company's chief scientist Beth Shapiro stated that the three animals are merely "grey wolves with 20 edits" as purportedly stated by the company "from the very beginning", acknowledging that it is impossible to bring back an extinct organism, or at least an organism "identical to a species that used to be alive". She admitted that the term "dire wolves" applied to the pups are a colloquialism, not scientific terminology.

In the same month, Colossal along with University of Melbourne announced that they have successfully created vital stem cells for the thylacine, with researchers estimating they could be re-introduced in the wilderness in as little as 8 years.

=== Development ===
Because the woolly mammoth and Asian elephant share 99.6% of the same DNA, Colossal aimed to develop a proxy species by swapping enough key mammoth genes into the Asian elephant genome. Key mammoth genetic traits include a 10-centimeter layer of insulating fat, five different types of shaggy hair, and smaller ears to help the hybrid tolerate cold weather.

The company plans on sequencing both elephant and mammoth samples in order to identify key genes in both species to promote population diversification. By doing so, Colossal hopes to prevent any rogue mutations within the hybrid herd. Colossal set a goal for the company to grow a woolly mammoth calf by 2028.

The company plans to use African and Asian elephants as potential surrogates and plans to develop artificial elephant wombs lined with uterine tissue as a parallel path to gestation. In 2021, it was reported that Colossal scientists planned on creating these embryos by taking skin cells from Asian elephants and reprogramming them into induced pluripotent stem cells which carry mammoth DNA. Lamm stated that Colossal will use both induced pluripotent stem cells (iPSC) as well as somatic cell nuclear transfer in the process.

In August 2022, Colossal announced that they would launch a thylacine research project, in hopes of "de-extincting" the Tasmanian tiger. Colossal planned to reintroduce the thylacine proxy to selected areas in Tasmania and broader Australia and claimed that, by doing so, this would re-balance ecosystems that have suffered biodiversity loss and degradation since the species disappeared. A successful thylacine proxy birth could also introduce new marsupial-assisted reproductive technology, which could aid in other marsupial conservation efforts. Colossal partnered with the University of Melbourne for the project, led by Andrew Pask. The Tasmanian Thylacine Advisory Committee was launched in December 2023.

In January 2023, Colossal announced the formation of its Avian Genomics Group, which would be dedicated to reconstructing the DNA of the dodo bird, which went extinct in the 1600s. Led by Beth Shapiro, who serves as Chief Science Officer to Colossal, this research group aims to create a hybrid composed of specific traits most commonly associated with the dodo and plans to reintroduce these hybrids into their respective environments. Colossal will be working with primordial germ cells to pair dodo DNA with the genome of the Nicobar pigeon, the extinct dodo's closest living relative, and develop chimeric chicks as surrogates for future dodo restoration.

In July 2025, Colossal announced a collaboration with Peter Jackson, Canterbury Museum and Ngāi Tahu to revive the New Zealand moa. Local scientists largely dismissed the project as unrealistic. University of Otago zoologist Philip Seddon said the project had "nothing much to do with solving the global extinction crisis and more to do with generating fundraising media coverage". Colossal rejected this characterization. In addition to ecological concerns, Dr Nic Rawlence raised ethical concerns about the project, claiming that iwi he had consulted with in his work were widely opposed to "de-extinction" of moa, and wanted any bone samples, DNA extracts or sequence data to remain in New Zealand. He called for greater transparency from the parties involved about how widely they had engaged with Ngāi Tahu.

In April 2026, Colossal announced that it had been working to resurrect the bluebuck, also known as the blue antelope, which became extinct 200 years prior due to hunting. It was the company's first project on mainland Africa.

=== Future projects ===
Outside of their first five projects, Colossal Biosciences has stated that they have a "long list" of species that they want to revive and reintroduce to appropriate ecosystems. Such species include Castoroides, Arctodus, and Steller's sea cow. Ben Lamm has stated that he and his company want to revive Steller's sea cow once they have developed an artificial womb, as there are no adequate living relatives of the extinct sea cow to act a surrogate species. Colossal has also done genetic research for the following species; Irish elk, great auk, ground sloth, saber-tooth cat, long-horned bison, Columbian mammoth, cave hyena, mastodon, American cheetah, tooth-billed pigeon, and woolly rhinoceros, with the intent to potentially revive them in the future.

== Conservation ==
In October 2022, Colossal announced that it was developing a vaccine for elephant endotheliotropic herpesvirus (EEHV), in partnership with the Baylor College of Medicine.

In May 2023, Colossal partnered with the Vertebrate Genomes Project to successfully generate the first high-quality reference genome of an African elephant. This sequencing work is part of a long-term conservation effort for the endangered elephant species.

In September 2023, Colossal partnered with BioRescue to help save the northern white rhino from extinction by using reproduction technology and stem cell technology, as the subspecies is functionally extinct with only two known infertile female members left.

Colossal and Zoos Victoria began a conservation project in October 2023 to preserve the Victorian Grassland Earless Dragon as well as sequence its genome.

In November 2023, Colossal announced a research partnership with Save the Elephants to track African elephants in the Samburu National Reserve. Save the Elephants has already tracked over 900 elephants in the area, using drones equipped with high-resolution infrared cameras. Colossal plans to use pose estimation to develop algorithms for labeling elephants and automatically identifying individual and collective social behavior.

Colossal also began a partnership with the Mauritian Wildlife Foundation in November 2023. The company stated that they would work in collaboration with the Foundation to restore "critical ecosystems through invasive species removal, revegetation, and community awareness efforts." Additionally, Colossal also planned focus on the rewilding of the dodo bird as well as the genetic rescue of the pink pigeon.

In March 2024, Colossal and Re:wild partnered together to establish a "10-year conservation strategy" to accelerate efforts to "save species on the brink of extinction, search for lost species, and restore key habitats for species recovery and rewilding."

In May 2024, Colossal and the University of Melbourne announced the successful engineering of cane toad toxin resistance in marsupial cells, as part of conservation efforts for the northern quoll.

The first-ever mRNA vaccine for elephant endotheliotropic herpesvirus (EEHV), developed by Colossal, the Houston Zoo, and the Baylor College of Medicine, was administered to an elephant in July 2024.

In October 2024, Colossal announced its launch of the Colossal Foundation, a non-profit initiative that utilizes Colossal-developed science and technology methods for partner-led conservative efforts. Included in its conservation agenda is the Colossal Biovault, "the world's largest distributed biobanking initiative."

In December 2024, Colossal and University of Melbourne began research into engineering an immunity to chytridiomycosis, a lethal fungal-based disease in amphibians that is responsible for many extinctions and declines in amphibians, including the golden toad and Rabbs' fringe-limbed tree frog.

In April 2025, Colossal announced the facilitated birth of two cloned red wolf litters from three different genetic founder lines. The litters included three male red wolf pups (Blaze, Cinder, and Ash) as well as one adolescent female red wolf (Hope). However, Joseph Hinton from the Wolf Conservation Center in New York disagreed with this claim, stating that they are merely "derived from coyotes captured in southwest Louisiana for the Gulf Coast Canid Project". In the same month, Colossal in collaboration with IPB University announced that they would use assisted reproduction technology and similar methods used in the company's dire wolf project to help save the Sumatran rhinoceros from extinction.

In June 2026, the U.S. Department of the Interior announced a partnership between Colossal and the U.S. Fish and Wildlife Service using Colossal's biobanking program to "[preserve] genetic diversity among threatened and endangered species, [expand] scientific understanding of genomic applications in conservation, and [explore] emerging technologies that may strengthen recovery efforts for species at risk", "identify opportunities to expand biobanking efforts for species of conservation concern, develop approaches for integrating genomic information into conservation planning, establish best practices for data management and accessibility, and support training and capacity-building initiatives related to conservation genomics", and "facilitate scientific exchange and help identify priority species and conservation needs where biobanking may provide meaningful benefits to recovery and management efforts" in accordance with President Donald Trump's vision to promote American innovation, public-private partnerships, and "ensure that conservation programs are informed by the best available science and technology."

In September 2026, the Colossal Foundation and the IUCN Species Survival Commission announced a four-year $4 million partnership including a grant program for neglected species such as fungi, plants, invertebrates, fishes and reptiles as well as a global education campaign.

== Reception ==
In 2022, Colossal was listed as one of the World Economic Forum's Technology Pioneers and was named Genomics Innovation of the Year by the BioTech Breakthrough Awards. Colossal was included as part of Time's 100 Most Influential Companies 2023 list. Colossal was voted one of the best places to work in Dallas, Texas, U.S. by Builtin in 2025.

The company's aim of de-extinction has been criticised by some scientists and conservationists, who consider it to be a "fantasy" due to the poor and fragmentary preservation of ancient DNA, and argue that the money could be better spent on conserving extant ecosystems and wildlife. Ancient DNA professor Jeremy Austin has suggested that Colossal's efforts are "more about media attention for the scientists and less about doing serious science."

In July 2025, New Scientist revealed that some academics who have criticised Colossal's work have been targeted by an apparently coordinated smear campaign. Vincent Lynch, Flint Dibble, Victoria Herridge and Nic Rawlence say they have been the subject of AI-generated blog posts calling into question their credentials and reasons for criticising Colossal. Some who produce video content have also been the subject of bogus YouTube copyright strikes. Colossal responded that "neither Colossal, nor any of its investors, are involved in commissioning negative stories about critics".

== See also ==
- Arava Institute for Environmental Studies
- Frozen Zoo
- Quagga Project
- Revive & Restore
- Tauros Programme
