= Beth Shapiro =

American evolutionary molecular biologist (born 1976)

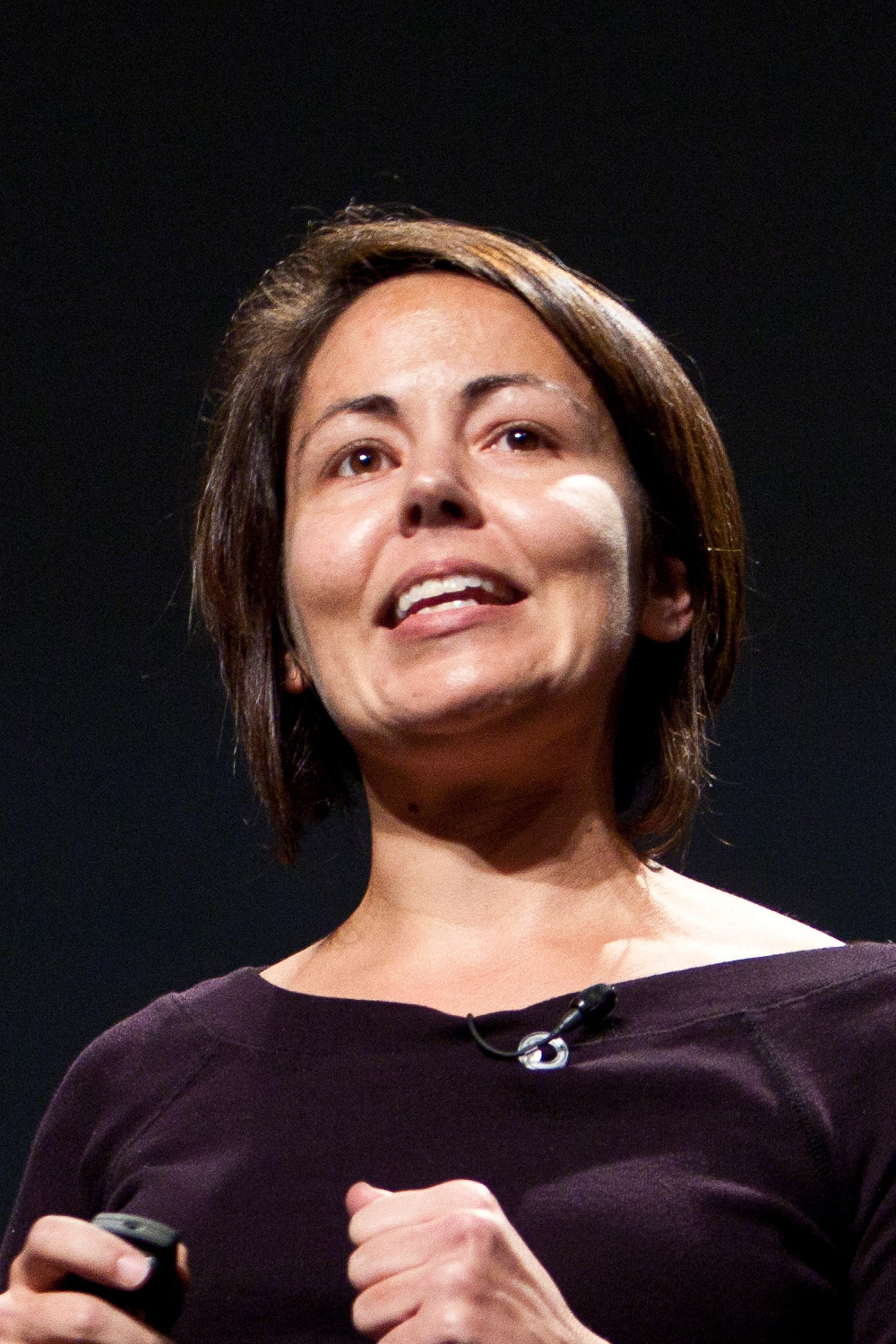
- Shapiro in 2010
- Born: Beth Alison Shapiro; January 14, 1976 (age 50); Allentown, Pennsylvania, U.S.
- Education: University of Georgia (BA, MA); University of Oxford (PhD)
- Known for: How to Clone a Mammoth
- Spouse: Richard Edward Green
- Children: 2
- Awards: Rhodes Scholarship (1999); Wellcome Trust Research Fellowship (2004); Royal Society University Research Fellowship (2006); MacArthur Fellowship (2009); American Academy of Arts and Sciences (2023); National Academy of Sciences (2025)
- Scientific career
- Fields: Ancient DNA; Genomics; Molecular ecology
- Workplaces: University of California, Santa Cruz; University of Oxford; Pennsylvania State University; Colossal Biosciences
- Thesis: Inferring evolutionary history and processes using ancient DNA (2003)
- Doctoral advisor: Alan J. Cooper
- Website: pgl.soe.ucsc.edu

Beth Alison Shapiro (born January 14, 1976) is an American evolutionary molecular biologist, associate director for conservation genomics at the UC Santa Cruz Genomics Institute, and a Howard Hughes Medical Institute investigator. She also teaches in the Department of Ecology and Evolutionary Biology at the University of California, Santa Cruz. In March 2024, Shapiro began a three year sabbatical to become the chief scientific officer of Colossal Biosciences.

Shapiro's work has centered on the analysis of ancient DNA. She was awarded a Royal Society University Research Fellowship in 2006 and a MacArthur Fellowship in 2009. She was elected a Member of the National Academy of Sciences in 2025.

== Early life and education ==
On January 14, 1976, Shapiro was born in Allentown, Pennsylvania. She grew up in Rome, Georgia, where she served as a local news presenter while attending Rome High School.

In 1994, Shapiro graduated from Rome High School with a GPA of 4.0, and entered the University of Georgia. She studied Mandarin Chinese, Spanish, English literature, and geology prior to choosing ecology as her major.

In 1999, Shapiro graduated summa cum laude with BA and MA degrees in ecology. The same year, she was awarded a Rhodes Scholarship.

In 2003, Shapiro completed a Ph.D. from the University of Oxford for research on inferring evolutionary history and processes using ancient DNA supervised by Alan J. Cooper.

== Career ==
In 2004, Shapiro was appointed a Wellcome Trust Research Fellow at the University of Oxford and director of the Henry Wellcome Biomolecules Centre at Oxford, a position she held until 2007. In 2006, she was awarded a Royal Society University Research Fellowship. While at the Biomolecules Centre, Shapiro carried out mitochondrial DNA analysis of the dodo.

Shapiro's research on ecology has been published in journals including Molecular Biology and Evolution, PLOS Biology, Science, and Nature. In 2007, she was named by Smithsonian magazine as one of 37 young American innovators under the age of 36.

In 2024, Shapiro was appointed as chief science officer of Colossal Biosciences to help the company meet its de-extinction and species preservation goals. In the same year, Shapiro received backlash and become a target of fan activism and trolling from fans of the Jurassic Park media franchise for stating dinosaur de-extinction is impossible, or at least not possible in the way it is commonly depicted in science fiction.

In 2025, Colossal announced that they had created woolly mice as part of the process of bringing back mammoths. When this was dismissed by philosopher Craig Callender as "a stunt", Shapiro replied, "Some people argue that our whole company is a stunt ... Gene editing could be used to help species become resistant to disease, to restore missing genetic variation or to correct gene sequences that lead to genetic disease but have become fixed in that population."

In 2025, Colossal claimed that it had resurrected the dire wolf which was disputed by the science community. As part of the project, Colossal also said it cloned several red wolves, an American species of wolves considered to be one of the most endangered wolves in the world. Shapiro said they hoped the rebirth of the dire wolves would bring attention and get people excited over the idea of using biotechnology to support conservation efforts.

She is an elected member of the National Academy of Sciences.

== Publications ==
Shapiro's peer reviewed publications in scientific journals and books include:

- Life as We Made It: How 50,000 years of human innovation refined – and redefined – nature
- Bayesian coalescent inference of past population dynamics from molecular sequences
- Rise and fall of the Beringian steppe bison
- Ancient DNA: Methods and Protocols
- How to Clone a Mammoth: The Science of De-Extinction
- Flight of the Dodo
- A late Pleistocene steppe bison (Bison priscus) partial carcass from Tsiigehtchic, Northwest Territories, Canada

== Honors and awards ==
- Time 100 Most Influential People in Health (2025)
- Fellow of the American Academy of Arts and Sciences (2023)
- National Geographic Society Emerging Explorer (2010)
- University of Georgia Young Alumnus Award (2010)
- MacArthur Fellowship (2009)
- Royal Society University Research Fellowship (2006)
- Rhodes Scholarship (1999)

== Personal life ==
Shapiro is married to biomolecular engineering professor Richard Edward Green and has two sons.
