= Woolly mouse =

Variety of genetically modified laboratory mice

- Organism: Mus musculus
- Mode: Genome editing
- Developer: Colossal Biosciences
- Trait(s) conferred: Woolly coat; Elongated hair; Golden-brown fur; Cold tolerance; Curly whiskers; altered metabolism

The woolly mouse is a variety of genetically modified laboratory mice created in 2024 by Colossal Biosciences as part of a proof-of-concept in de-extinction of the woolly mammoth through genetically modifying its closest living relative. The mice feature mammoth-inspired traits which include dense woolly coats, altered metabolism and other genetic modifications aimed at cold tolerance.

== Background ==
Colossal Biosciences, an American biotechnology company, initiated the woolly mouse project as part of their broader woolly mammoth de-extinction program. The company made efforts to restore woolly mammoths through genetic engineering of Asian elephants by introducing mammoth-like traits that would allow the resulting species to survive in cold environments.

The company proposed that herds of genetically modified elephants with mammoth-like traits could help mitigate climate change through their impact on Arctic ecosystems. According to the company's hypothesis, these creatures would graze in ways that promote grassland development in tundra regions and reduce permafrost thaw, thus decreasing the release of carbon dioxide from permafrost melt.

The research was announced on March 4, 2025, with the company stating their intention to produce the first genetically modified elephant calf with mammoth characteristics by the end of 2028. The unreviewed preprint covering this project was published in the same day of its announcement.

== Development ==
The research team employed genome editing techniques such as CRISPR gene editing to develop the woolly mouse, including the direct genetic modification of 7 genes in fertilized mouse egg and the modification of 5 genes through embryonic mouse stem cells, which were then injected into mouse embryos. This was followed with the implantation of modified embryos into surrogate mice. Mice were chosen as a test subject due to their fast gestation and ease of development.

The scientists targeted nine specific genes associated with hair characteristics (color, texture, length, pattern, and follicle development). Seven of the genes were selected based on previous knowledge of their influence on mouse coats, with the modifications designed to produce traits that would resemble mammoth features, such as golden-colored fur. This included FGF5 (fibroblast growth factor 5), that is involved with the hair growth cycle, and MC1R (melanocortin 1 receptor), involved in the regulation of melanin production. Two of the targeted genes had direct mammoth counterparts believed to contribute to the species's woolly coat. Additionally, the team modified a gene linked to lipid metabolism in mice that also existed in mammoths, hypothesizing that the modification might enhance cold adaptation.

While many of the experimental embryos did not develop into viable pups, all successfully birthed individuals were still alive as of March 2025, according to Colossal CSO Beth Shapiro. The successfully born mice exhibited woolly coats with elongated hair of about 5 centimetres (2.0 in) in length, bearing a golden-brown coloration. The efficiency of genetic editing varied among specimens, with many individuals displaying 100% of the attempted genetic modifications. Notably, mice with the modified fat metabolism gene showed no significant difference in average body mass compared to those without this modification. As of the announcement, the team had not yet conducted behavioral tests to evaluate cold tolerance in the modified mice, though they expressed plans to do so in the coming months. The mice now reside in Colossal Biosciences laboratory in Dallas, Texas.

== Reception ==
Scientific reception to the project was generally mixed. Robin Lovell-Badge, head of the Francis Crick Institute's developmental genetics and stem cell biology fields, acknowledged the technical achievements involved in the genetic modification procedures, but highlighted several limitations. He stated that the research did not elucidate the mechanisms through which the genetic modifications produced different hair types or whether the modified mice actually exhibited enhanced cold tolerance, and did not address the substantially greater complexity involved in de-extinction of mammoths. Lovell-Badge questioned whether the financial resources directed toward de-extinction efforts might be better utilized in preventing extinctions of currently endangered species.

University of Sheffield palaeontologist Victoria Herridge emphasized that engineering a woolly mammoth-like elephant presents significantly greater challenges compared to mice. These included elephants bearing a much larger number of genes involved in the phenotype, having less understood genetic mechanisms, as well as the potential complications related to using an uncommon experimental animal as a surrogate. Concerns about the ethics of altering genes and using animals as test subjects have been raised regarding this project. According to Colossal Biosciences CEO Ben Lamm: “Besides the adorability factor – we did not factor in how cute they would be – now we have produced healthy living animals that have the exact phenotypes that we predicted, based on using ancient DNA and computational analysis in genome engineering,” Despite public interest Colossal Bioscience says they will not sell the woolly mouse, and that they will remain private for further de-extinction research.

== See also ==
- Knockout mouse
- Oncomouse
