= VGP JSC =

- Company type: Public
- Industry: Paper Products
- Founded: 1999
- Headquarters: Lutsk, Ukraine
- Products: napkins, toilet paper, paper towels, paper handkerchiefs
- Website: http://www.ruta.ua

"VGP", JSC (until 2008 Volyngolovpostach) is leading Ukrainian manufacture of sanitary and hygienic products including (napkins, toilet paper, handkerchiefs, kitchen towels), under Brands «Ruta», «Рута Light», «Fesco», «Puchnasta simeyka». Also among the other businesses are manufacturing of cement and metal distribution.

== History ==
"VGP" has been working on the Ukrainian market from 1963. Before the 1990s the company was an independent division of the Soviet structure of supply Lvovhlavsnab (Lvivholovpostach). In 1994 after reorganization in Open Joint Stock Company Volyngolovpostach started its activity due to commercial basis. In 1998 low-profit company was headed by a new management and Miretskyy Ilya Borisovich was elected as its general director. The first step was the introduction of new business strategy and focus on capability development at the most promising and important areas of activity in the context of the specification of Ukrainian market. Since 1998 Volyngolovpostach began manufacture of sanitary-hygienic products, introduced new business projects.

== Name ==
In early 2008, the shareholders of Volyngolovpostach JSC decided to rename the company to VGP JSC and in 2010 received a joint stock company status public. This step is caused by starting work on international markets and creation of comfortable conditions for cooperation. Choosing a new name for the company its management wanted to keep the traditional name which has been successful on the market since early 60s so preference was given to acronym VGP.

== About company ==
Company staff includes about 400 employees.

== Product range ==
Product range includes napkins, toilet paper, paper towels, handkerchief.

== Private Label ==
"VGP" produces not only its own products but also works with Private Label products of Ukrainian and foreign corporate clients. Manufacturing capacity satisfies needs of all partners including as well as national and international hotels and restaurants (Express, Reprise, Sushi, Palmira Palace) and major national and international commercial networks (Paterson, Perekrestok, Metro, Auchan, Silpo).

== Sales geography ==
Today, production of PJSC "VGP" is presented at the markets of Ukraine, Russia, Hungarian, Kazakhstan, Latvia, Lithuanian, Estonian, Belarus, Moldova, Kyrgyzstan.
