= Vertebrate Genomes Project =

Genome project to sequence all vertebrate species

The Vertebrate Genomes Project (VGP) is a project which aims to generate high-quality, complete reference genomes of all 66,000 vertebrate species. It is an international cooperation project with members from more than 50 separate institutions and was launched in February 2017.

In October 2021, VGP partnered with Colossal Biosciences to sequence and assemble elephant genomes for preservation purposes.

In April 2022, VGP partnered with the Human Genome Project and the African BioGenome Project for sequencing research.

In July 2022, VGP and Colossal Biosciences announced that they successfully sequenced the entire Asian elephant genome; this is the first time that mammalian genetic code has been fully sequenced to this degree since the Human Genome Project was completed in the early 2000s.

In November 2022, VGP successfully sequenced the Nile Rat genome in order to facilitate research on type 2 diabetes and the health effects of circadian rhythm disruption. Not only did researchers sequence an individual rat, but they also sequenced both its parents, allowing them to separate the original rat’s alleles by parental haplotype. The resulting sequence showed that the vast majority of expected protein-coding genes were accounted for.
