= De-extinction =

Process of re-creating an extinct organism

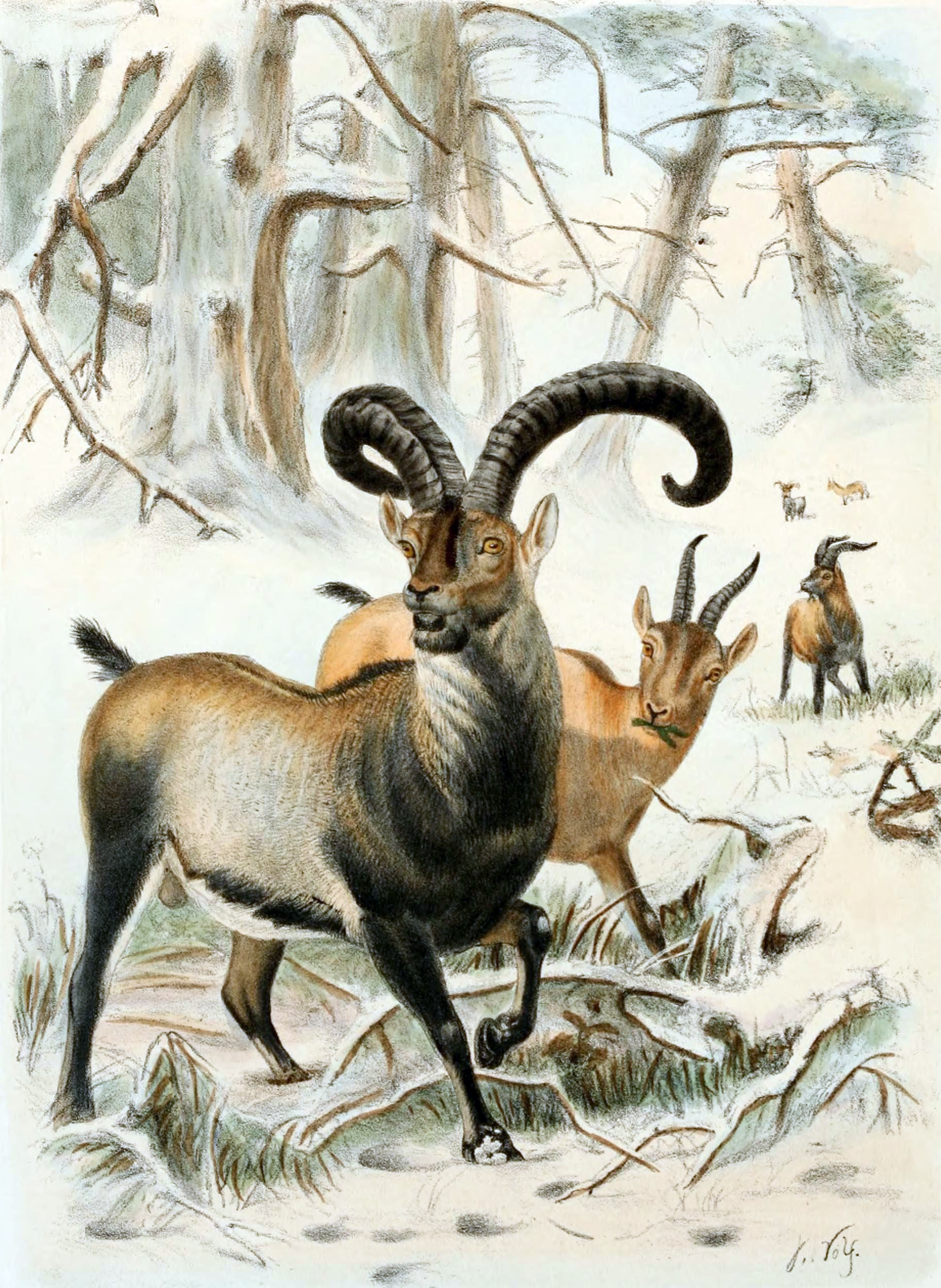
The Pyrenean ibex, also known as the bouquetin (French) and bucardo (Spanish), is the only animal to have survived de-extinction past birth through cloning.

De-extinction (also known as resurrection biology, or species revivalism) is the process of human intervention to generate an organism that either resembled or is an extinct organism. There are several ways to carry out the process of de-extinction. Cloning is the most widely proposed method, although genome editing and selective breeding have also been considered. Similar techniques have been applied to certain endangered species, in hopes of boosting their genetic diversity. The only method of the three that would provide an animal with the same genetic identity is cloning. There are benefits and drawbacks to the process of de-extinction ranging from technological advancements to ethical issues.

== History of the term ==
De-extinction as a concept involving genetics traces back to the Nazi-era eco-fascist efforts "integral to recreating the mythical German landscape of ancient times, when the Aryan race was pure and unthreatened", but the term itself arose in the twentieth century "in response to a series of breakthroughs in resurrection biology".

One example of this was the work done by Berlin zoo director Lutz Heck, in collaboration with his brother and Munich zoo director Heinz Heck, to bring aurochs back from extinction through a process of selective breeding. Their work was condemned by the Union of German Zoo Directors in 1951, when they stated "that their organization would offer no financial or other support for breeding back extinct species since it was not only a scientific impossibility but took away resources from the pressing issue of preserving threatened animals."

== Methods ==
=== Cloning ===
Pictured above is the process used to clone the Pyrenean ibex. The tissue culture was taken from the last living, female Pyrenean ibex named Celia. The egg was taken from a goat (Capra hircus) and the nucleus removed to ensure the offspring was purely Pyrenean ibex. The egg was implanted into a surrogate goat mother for development.

Cloning is a commonly suggested method for the potential restoration of an extinct species. It can be done by extracting the nucleus from a preserved cell from the extinct species and swapping it into an egg, without a nucleus, of that species' nearest living relative. The egg can then be inserted into a host from the extinct species' nearest living relative. This method can only be used when a preserved cell is available, meaning it would be most feasible for recently extinct species. Cloning offers the most direct route to an organism with the original species' nuclear genome, but it requires well-preserved viable donor cells. Cloning has been used by scientists since the 1950s. One of the most well known clones is Dolly the sheep. Dolly was born in the mid-1990s and lived normally until the abrupt midlife onset of health complications resembling premature aging, that led to her death. Other known cloned animal species include domestic cats, dogs, pigs, and horses.

=== Genome editing ===
Genome editing has been rapidly advancing with the help of the CRISPR/Cas systems, particularly CRISPR/Cas9. The CRISPR/Cas9 system was originally discovered as part of the bacterial immune system. Viral DNA that was injected into the bacterium became incorporated into the bacterial chromosome at specific regions. These regions are called clustered regularly interspaced short palindromic repeats, otherwise known as CRISPR. Since the viral DNA is within the chromosome, it gets transcribed into RNA. Once this occurs, the Cas9 binds to the RNA. Cas9 can recognize the foreign insert and cleave it. This discovery was very crucial because the Cas protein can now be viewed as a scissor in the genome editing process.

By using cells from a closely related species to the extinct species, genome editing can play a role in the de-extinction process. Germ cells may be edited directly, so that the egg and sperm produced by the extant parent species will produce offspring of the extinct species, or somatic cells may be edited and transferred via somatic cell nuclear transfer. The result is an animal which is not completely the extinct species, but rather a hybrid of the extinct species and the closely related, non-extinct species. Because it is possible to sequence and assemble the genome of extinct organisms from highly degraded tissues, this technique enables scientists to pursue de-extinction in a wider array of species, including those for which no well-preserved remains exist. However, the more degraded and old the tissue from the extinct species is, the more fragmented the resulting DNA will be, making genome assembly more challenging. Genome editing does not require living cells from the exact same species and can target specific adaptive traits, but an organism created via this method can only ever be a proxy/hybrid.

=== Back-breeding ===
Back breeding is a form of selective breeding. As opposed to breeding animals for a trait to advance the species in selective breeding, back breeding involves breeding animals for an ancestral characteristic that may not be seen throughout the species as frequently. This method can recreate the traits of an extinct species, but the genome will differ from the original species. Back breeding, however, is contingent on the ancestral trait of the species still being in the population in any frequency. Back breeding is also a form of artificial selection by the deliberate selective breeding of domestic animals, in an attempt to achieve an animal breed with a phenotype that resembles a wild type ancestor, usually one that has gone extinct. Because back-breeding uses standard breeding techniques, no genetic reconstruction or preserved cells are required. The resulting offspring are phenotypic look-alikes, meaning that they are often lacking in behavioral, physiological, and ecological traits of the original species.

=== Recurrent evolution ===
A natural process somewhat resembling de-extinction is recurrent evolution. This occurs when a species becomes extinct, but then after some time a different species evolves into an almost identical creature. For example, the Aldabra rail was a flightless bird that lived on the island of Aldabra. It had evolved some time in the past from the flighted white-throated rail, but became extinct about 136,000 years ago due to an unknown event that caused sea levels to rise. About 100,000 years ago, sea levels dropped and the island reappeared, with no fauna. The white-throated rail recolonized the island, but soon evolved into a flightless species physically identical to the extinct species.

=== Herbarium specimens for de-extincting plants ===
Not all extinct plants have herbarium specimens that contain seeds. Of those that do, there is ongoing discussion on how to coax barely alive embryos back to life. Generally, plant material is better conserved than animal tissue. This means that if seeds are preserved, germination can produce living offspring that are identical to the historical specimen. However, many herbarium specimens do not contain viable seeds which complicate reintroduction.

=== In-vitro fertilisation and artificial insemination ===
In-vitro fertilisation and artificial insemination are assisted reproduction technology commonly used to treat infertility in humans. However, it has usage as a viable option for de-extinction in cases of functional extinction where all remaining individuals are of the same sex, incapable of naturally reproducing, or suffer from low genetic diversity such as the northern white rhinoceros, Yangtze giant softshell turtle, Hyophorbe amaricaulis, baiji, and vaquita. For example, viable embryos are created from preserved sperm from deceased males and ova from living females are implemented into a surrogate species. In-vitro fertillisation and artificial insemination can help preserve and restore genetic diversity to applicable near-extinct species where fresh gametes and tissues exist. However, cross-species surrogacy and embryo transfer present great biological and ethical challenges.

== Ethics of de-extinction ==
The concept of de-extinction is often met with skepticism, as it presents both significant advantages and disadvantages. Some may believe that extinction is a natural evolutionary process, but the 21st century has been marked as the sixth major extinction event in Earth's history. We have reached unprecedented speed and scale at which species are disappearing. Up to half of the species on Earth are predicted to disappear this century. The scale at which we are losing species is important to the ethical stakes de-extinction presents. This is overwhelmingly caused by human activity (habitat destruction, pollution, invasive species, climate change), not natural processes like previous extinctions. Since humans are the primary cause of this modern extinction, it can be argued that humans now have the moral obligation to repair it. The loss in species variation (biodiversity) is not a result of survival of the fittest, but the negative consequences of human interference with the planet.

With this in mind, reviving species lost through human actions may help restore biodiversity and address harms humans have caused to the planet. De-extinction can be viewed as an unnatural interference, while also showing potential as a tool for ecological restoration. Reviving species could be part of ecological restoration and ethically defensible.

== Advantages of de-extinction ==
The technologies being developed for de-extinction could lead to large advances in various fields:

- An advance in genetic technologies that are used to improve the cloning process for de-extinction could be used to prevent endangered species from becoming extinct.
- By studying revived previously extinct animals, cures to diseases could be discovered.
- Revived species may support conservation initiatives by acting as "flagship species" to generate public enthusiasm and funds for conserving entire ecosystems.

Prioritising de-extinction could lead to the improvement of current conservation strategies. Conservation measures would initially be necessary in order to reintroduce a species into the ecosystem, until the revived population can sustain itself in the wild. Reintroduction of an extinct species could also help improve ecosystems that had been destroyed by human development. It may also be argued that reviving species driven to extinction by humans is an ethical obligation.

== Disadvantages of de-extinction ==
The reintroduction of extinct species could have a negative impact on existing species and their ecosystem. The extinct species' ecological niche may have been filled in its former habitat, thus making them an invasive species. This could lead to the extinction of other species due to competition for food or other competitive exclusion. It could also lead to the extinction of prey species if they have more predators in an environment that had few predators before the reintroduction of an extinct species. If a species has been extinct for a long period of time the environment they are introduced to could be wildly different from the one that they can survive in. The changes in the environment due to human development could mean that the species may not survive if reintroduced into that ecosystem. A species could also become extinct again after de-extinction if the reasons for its extinction are still a threat. The woolly mammoth might be hunted by poachers just like elephants for their ivory and could go extinct again if this were to happen. Or, if a species is reintroduced into an environment with disease for which it has no immunity, the reintroduced species could be wiped out by a disease that current species can survive.

De-extinction is also a very expensive process. Bringing back one species can cost millions of dollars. The money for de-extinction would most likely come from current conservation efforts. These efforts could be weakened if funding is taken from conservation and put into de-extinction. This would mean that critically endangered species would start to go extinct faster because there are no longer resources that are needed to maintain their populations. Also, since cloning techniques cannot perfectly replicate a species as it existed in the wild, the reintroduction of the species may not bring about positive environmental benefits. They may not have the same role in the food chain that they did before and therefore cannot restore damaged ecosystems.

De-extinction also presents serious ethical challenges, particularly if applied to species with high cognitive abilities such as Neanderthals. If such beings were recreated, they might possess capacities for suffering and self-awareness, raising difficult questions about their rights and moral status. Without clear legal protections, they risk being treated as research tools or experimental assets rather than sentient individuals.

== Current candidate species for de-extinction ==
=== Aurochs ===
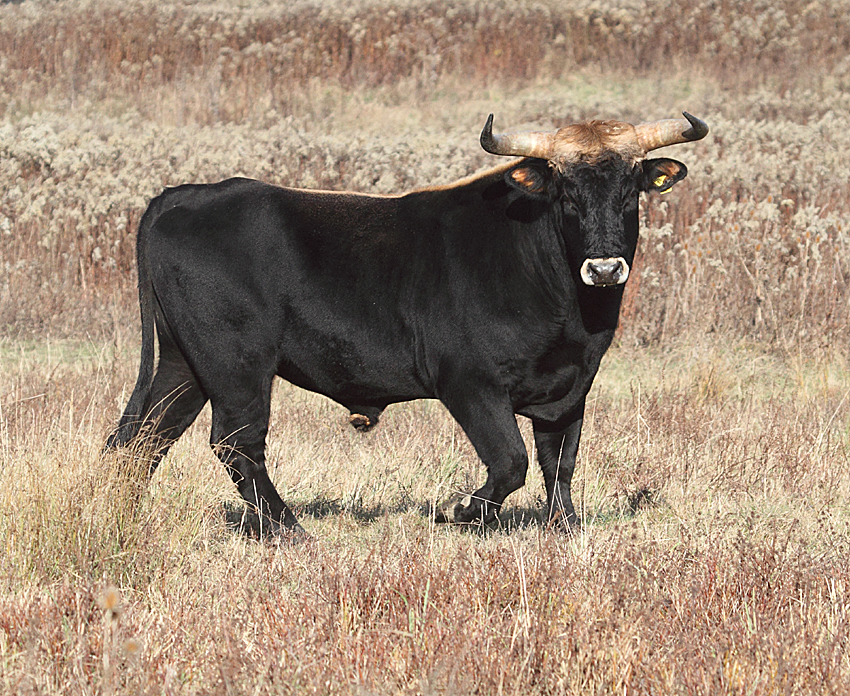
A bull from the Taurus Project, a project aiming to de-extinct the aurochs through back breeding modern domesticated cattle.

The aurochs (Bos primigenius) was widespread across Eurasia, North Africa, and the Indian subcontinent during the Pleistocene, but only the European aurochs (B. p. primigenius) survived into historical times. This species is heavily featured in European cave paintings, such as Lascaux and Chauvet Cave in France, and was still widespread during the Roman era. Following the fall of the Roman Empire, overhunting of the aurochs by nobility caused its population to dwindle to a single herd in the Jaktorów forest in Poland, where the last wild one died in 1627.

However, because the aurochs is ancestral to most modern cattle breeds, it is possible for it to be brought back through selective or back breeding. The first attempt at this was by Heinz and Lutz Heck using modern cattle breeds, which resulted in the creation of Heck cattle. This breed has been introduced to nature preserves across Europe; however, it differs strongly from the aurochs in physical characteristics, and some modern attempts claim to try to create an animal that is nearly identical to the aurochs in morphology, behavior, and even genetics. There are several projects that aim to create a cattle breed similar to the aurochs through selectively breeding primitive cattle breeds over a course of twenty years to create a self-sufficient bovine grazer in herds of at least 150 animals in rewilded nature areas across Europe, for example the Tauros Programme and the separate Taurus Project. This organization is partnered with the organization Rewilding Europe to help revert some European natural ecosystems to their prehistoric form.

A competing project to recreate the aurochs is the Uruz Project by the True Nature Foundation, which aims to recreate the aurochs by a more efficient breeding strategy using genome editing, in order to decrease the number of generations of breeding needed and the ability to quickly eliminate undesired traits from the population of aurochs-like cattle. It is hoped that aurochs-like cattle will reinvigorate European nature by restoring its ecological role as a keystone species and bring back biodiversity that disappeared following the decline of European megafauna, as well as helping to bring new economic opportunities related to European wildlife viewing.

In 2026, these animals will be reintroduced to parts of the Scottish Highlands.

=== Moa ===
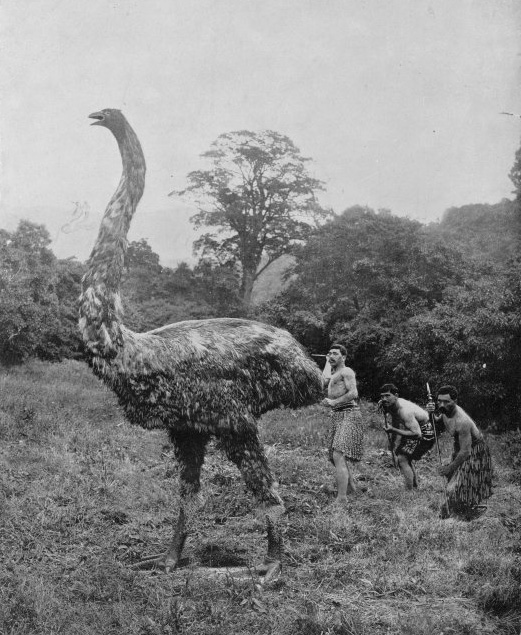
Reenactment of a moa hunt in the early 1900s

Moa (Dinornithiformes) were an order of flightless birds native to New Zealand. Following the arrival of the Māori people to New Zealand, all nine species were hunted to extinction by the 1400s. There are two active projects for species within this order; the bush moa (Anomalopteryx didiformis) and the South Island giant moa (Dinornis robustus). In 2018, scientists at Harvard University assembled the first nearly complete genome of the species from toe bones, thus bringing the species a step closer to de-extinction. Seven years later in July 2025, Colossal Biosciences in collaboration with Ngāi Tahu Research Centre at the University of Canterbury and funding from Peter Jackson, announced that they would attempt to de-extinct the South Island giant moa through genetically modifying the tinamou or emu, and eventually the other moa species.

The biggest problems with the project are that an "artificial egg" would be the only way to conceive a living animal, as even the smaller moa eggs are sufficiently larger than those of the common ostrich. Additionally, moa diverged from the two proposed living relatives 60 million years ago respectively, meaning that significant genetic edits with unforeseen consequences would need to be made to even approximate its phenotype.

=== Dire wolf ===
There have been attempts to recreate the dire wolf (Aenocyon dirus) in modern times. The first is a project called the Dire Wolf Project, a project begun in 1988 that aims to revive the species through backbreeding of domestic dogs, similar to the Quagga project. However, this project is not based in scientific method.

In April 2025, Colossal Biosciences showcased three genetically modified wolf pups with the characteristics of the dire wolf: six-month-old males Romulus and Remus and two-month-old female Khaleesi. In-house scientists at Colossal analyzed the dire wolf genome, extracted from two ancient samples – a 13,000-year-old tooth and a 72,000-year-old ear bone. After comparing the genomes of gray wolves and dire wolves to identify the genetic differences responsible for the dire wolf's distinctive features, Colossal made edits to the genetic code of the gray wolf to replicate those traits. Domestic dogs were used as surrogate mothers for the pups. Colossal claims that these minor genetic modifications effectively revive dire wolves as a species, though "no ancient dire wolf DNA was actually spliced into the gray wolf's genome".

=== Dodo ===
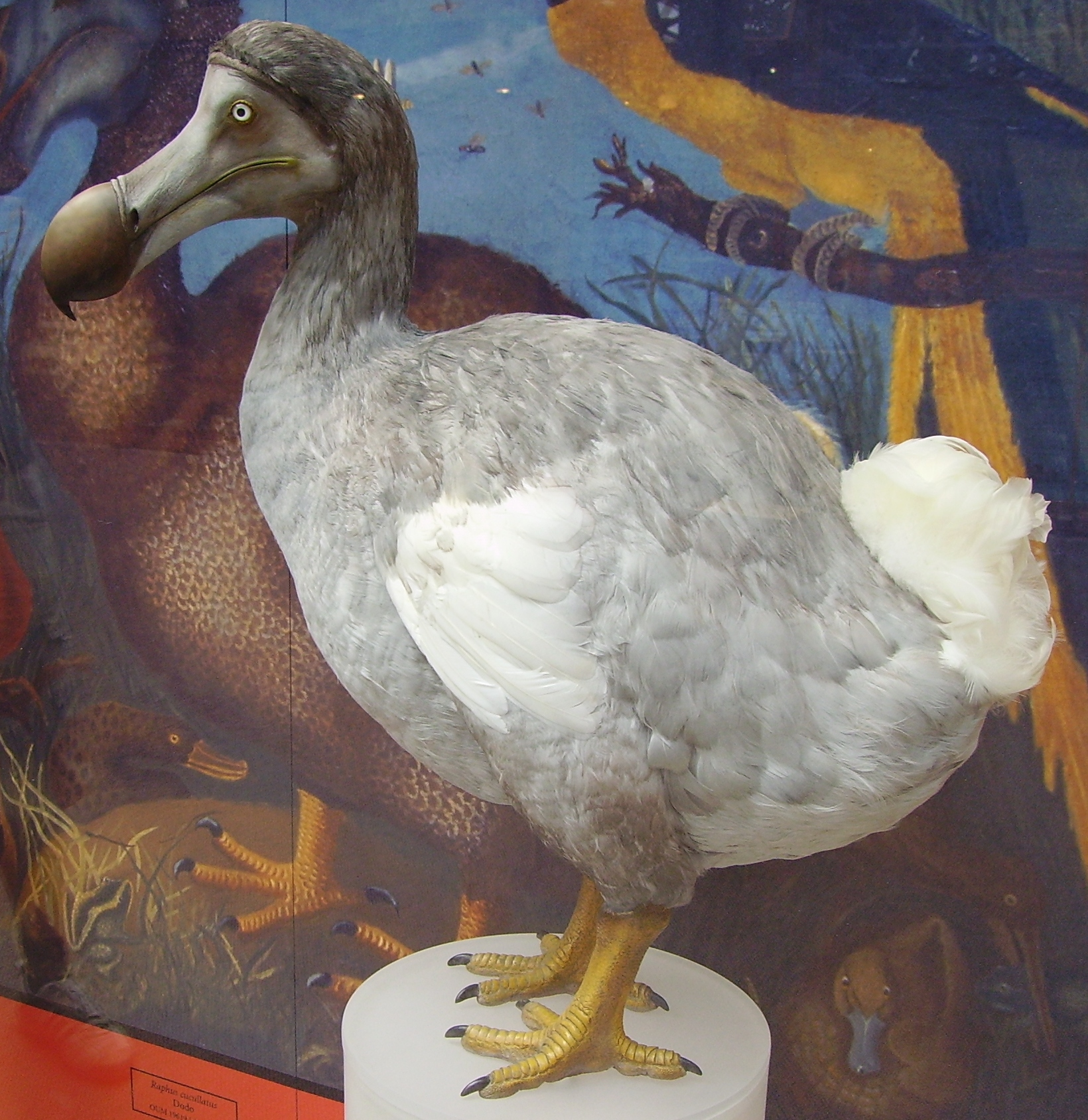
Model based on modern research at Oxford University Museum of Natural History

The dodo (Raphus cucullatus) was a flightless pigeon endemic to the island of Mauritius in the Indian Ocean. Due to various factors such as the inability to feel fear caused by isolation from significant predators, predation invasive species such as pigs, dogs, cats, rats, and crab-eating macaques, competition for food with invasive species, habitat loss, and the birds naturally slow reproduction, the species' numbers declined rapidly. The last widely accepted recorded sighting was in 1662. Since then, the bird has become a symbol for extinction and is often cited as the primary example of man-made extinction. In January 2023, Colossal Biosciences announced their project to revive the dodo alongside their previously announced projects for reviving the woolly mammoth and thylacine in hopes of restoring biodiversity to Mauritius and changing the dodo's status as a symbol of extinction to de-extinction.

In September 2025, Colossal announced that they had successfully cultivated primordial germ cells of the rock dove; a feat previously only achieved in chickens and geese, as a proof-of-concept in cultivating and genetically modifying the PGCs of the dodo's closest living relative: the Nicobar pigeon.

=== Heath hen ===
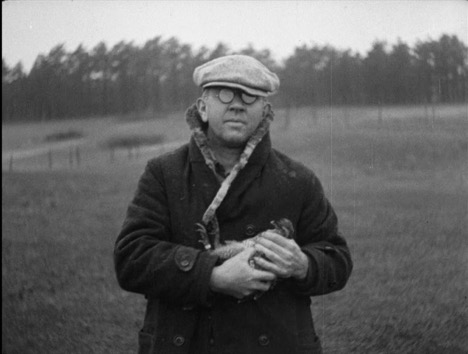
Ornithologist, professor Alfred Otto Gross holding Booming Ben, the last known heath hen

The heath hen (Tympanuchus cupido cupido) was a subspecies of greater prairie chicken endemic to the heathland barrens of coastal North America. It is even speculated that the pilgrims' first Thanksgiving featured this bird as the main course instead of wild turkey. Due to overhunting caused by its perceived abundancy, the population became extinct in mainland North America by 1870, leaving a population of 300 individuals left on Martha's Vineyard. Despite conservation efforts, the subspecies became extinct in 1932 following the disappearance and presumed death of Booming Ben, the final known member of the subspecies. In the summer of 2014, non-profit organisation, Revive & Restore held a meeting with the community of Martha's Vineyard to announce their project to revive the heath hen in hopes of restoring and maintaining the sandplain grasslands. On 8 April 2020, germs cells were collected from greater prairie chicken eggs at Texas A&M.

=== Ivory-billed woodpecker ===
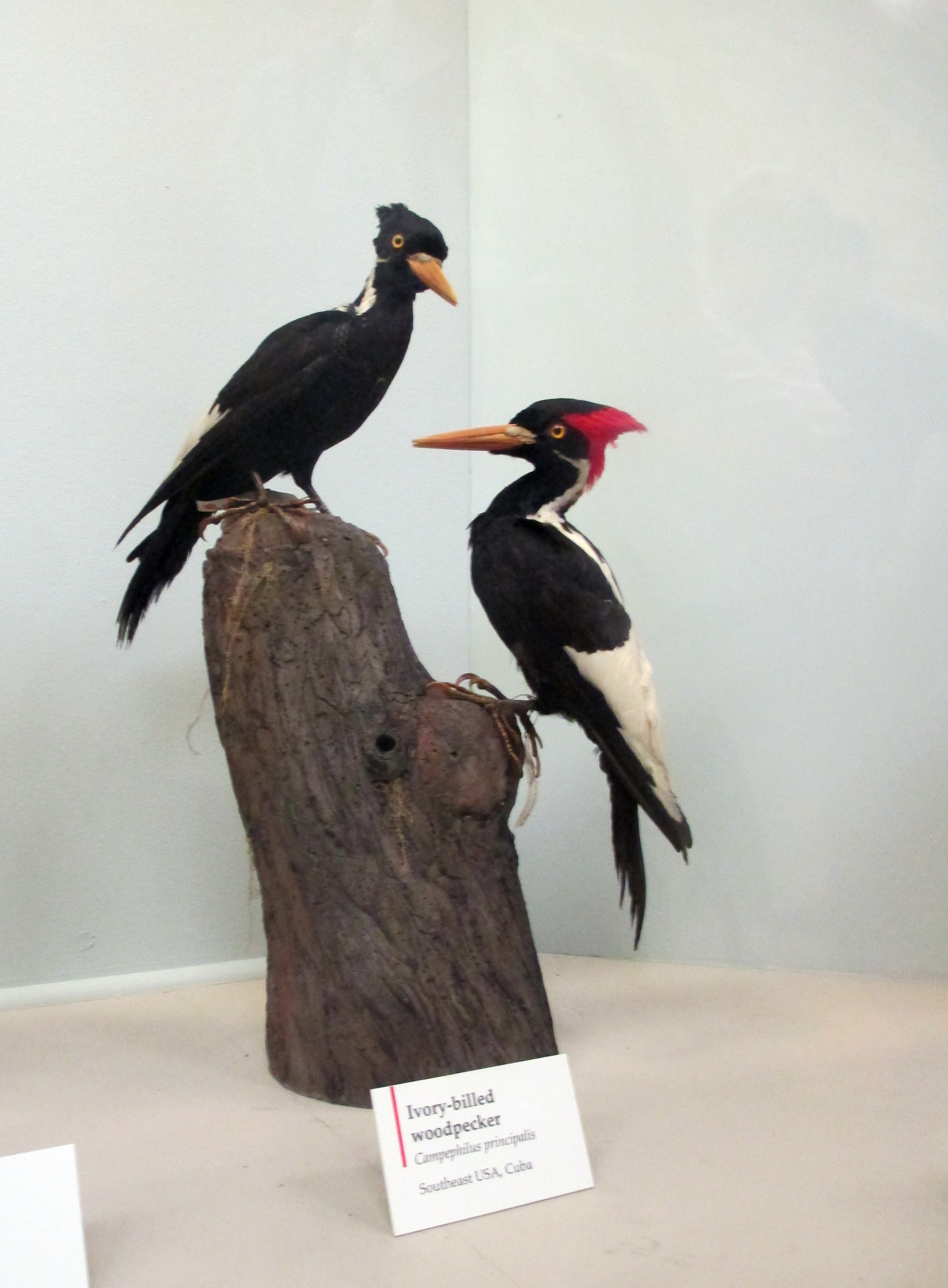
Stuffed male (bottom right) and female (upper left) specimens at the Natural History Museum, London

The ivory-billed woodpecker (Campephilus principalis) is the largest woodpecker native to the United States, with an endemic subspecies in Cuba. The species numbers have declined since the late 1800s due to logging and hunting. Similarly to the northern white rhinoceros, the ivory-billed woodpecker may not be completely extinct, but rather functionally extinct, though the evidence suggests that the species is 'very likely extinct'. In October 2024, Colossal Biosciences announced their non-profit Colossal Foundation, a foundation dedicated to conservation of extant species with their first projects being the Sumatran rhinoceros, vaquita, red wolf, pink pigeon, northern quoll, and ivory-billed woodpecker. Colossal plans to revive or rediscover the species through genome editing of its closest living relatives, such as the pileated woodpecker and using drones and AI to identify any potential remaining individuals in the wild.

=== Maclear's rat ===
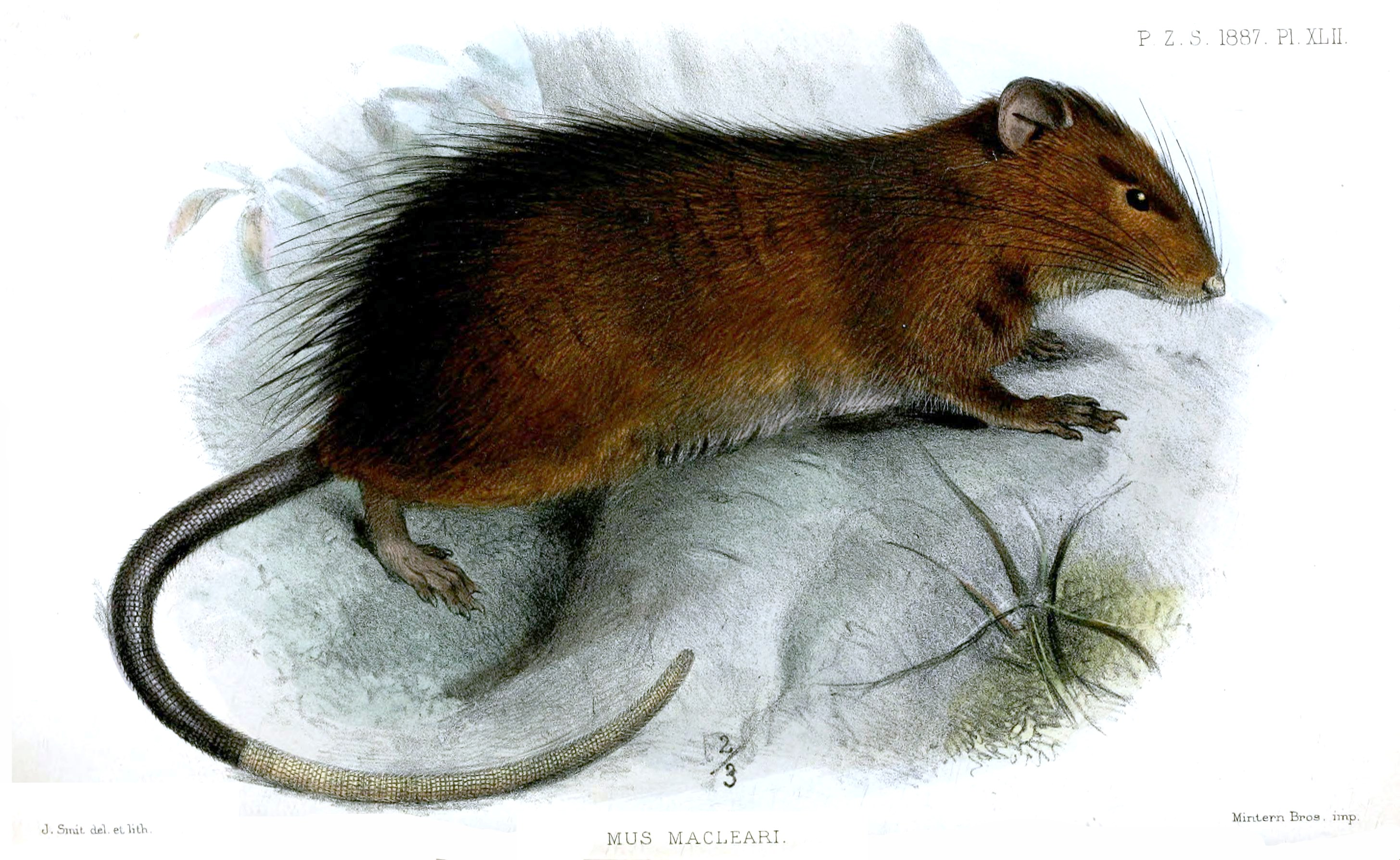
Maclear's rat, naturalist's painting

The Maclear's rat (Rattus macleari), also known as the Christmas Island rat, was a large rat endemic to Christmas Island in the Indian Ocean. It is believed Maclear's rat might have been responsible for keeping the population of Christmas Island red crab in check. It is thought that the accidental introduction of black rats by the Challenger expedition infected the Maclear's rats with a disease (possibly a trypanosome), which resulted in the species' decline. The last recorded sighting was in 1903. In March 2022, researchers discovered the Maclear's rat shared about 95% of its genes with the living brown rat, thus sparking hopes in bringing the species back to life. Scientists investigating whether CRISPR technology might be used to edit the DNA of the living species to match that of the extinct one, found out that a few key genes were missing, which would mean resurrected rats would not be genetically pure replicas.

=== Northern white rhinoceros ===
Sudan, the final male northern white rhinoceros was euthanised due to age-related illnesses on the Ol Pejeta Conservancy in 2018

The northern white rhinoceros or northern white rhino (Ceratotherium simum cottoni) is a subspecies of the white rhinoceros endemic to East and Central Africa south of the Sahara. Due to widespread and uncontrollable poaching and civil warfare in their former range, the subspecies' numbers dropped quickly over the course of the late 1900s and early 2000s. Unlike the majority of the potential candidates for de-extinction, the northern white rhinoceros is not extinct, but functionally extinct and is believed to be extinct in the wild with only two known female members left, Najin and Fatu who reside on the Ol Pejeta Conservancy in Kenya. The BioRescue Team in collaboration with Colossal Biosciences plan to implement 30 northern white rhinoceros embryos made from egg cells collected from Najin and Fatu and preserved sperm from dead male individuals into female southern white rhinoceros by the end of 2024. As of April 2026, only 6 embryo transfers have been conducted.

=== Passenger pigeon ===
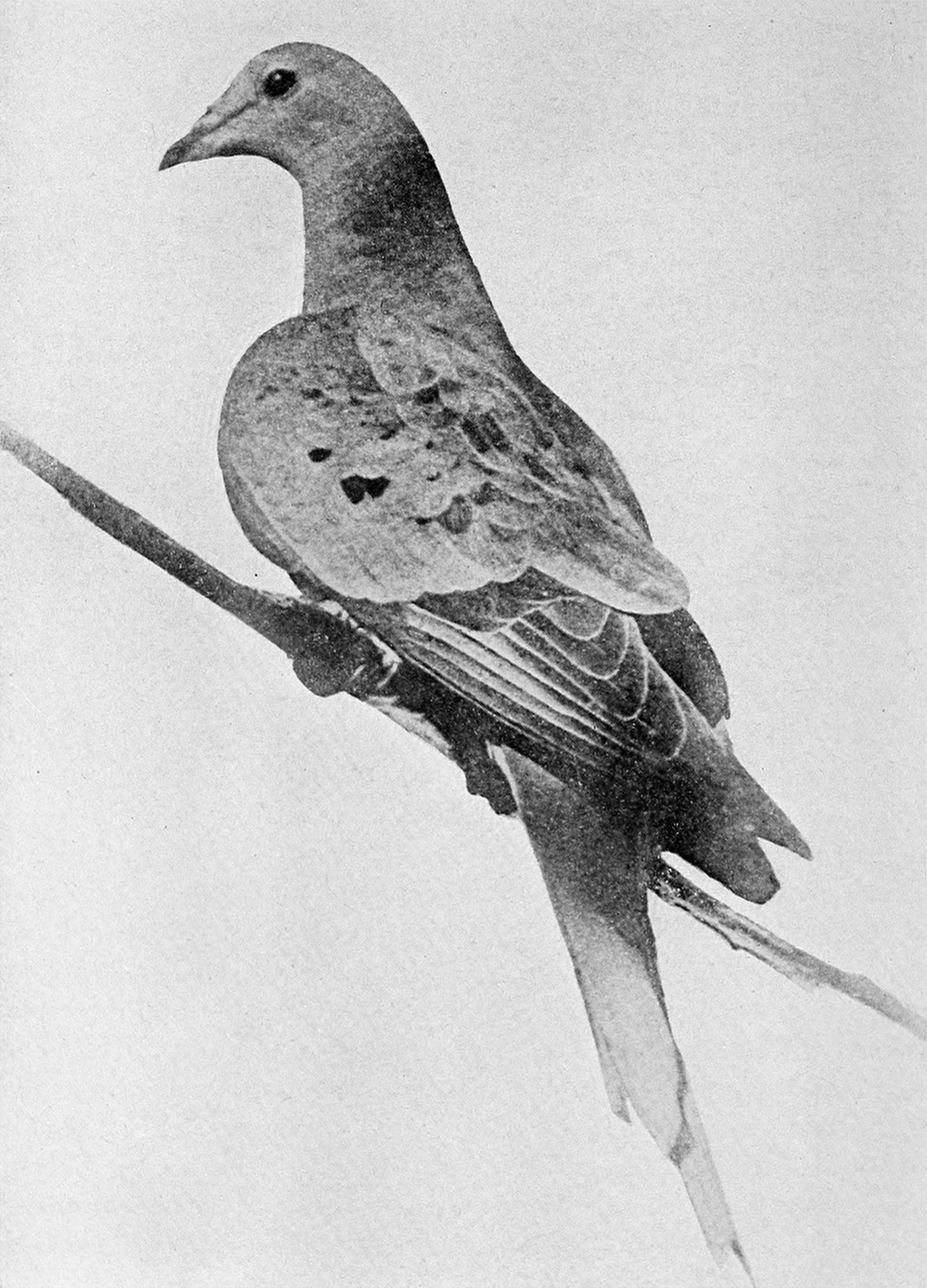
Martha, the last known passenger pigeon

The passenger pigeon (Ectopistes migratorius) numbered in the billions before being wiped out due to unsustainable commercial hunting and habitat loss during the early 20th century. The non-profit Revive & Restore obtained DNA from the passenger pigeon from museum specimens and skins; however, this DNA is degraded because it is so old. For this reason, simple cloning would not be an effective way to perform de-extinction for this species because parts of the genome would be missing. Instead, Revive & Restore focuses on identifying mutations in the DNA that would cause a phenotypic difference between the extinct passenger pigeon and one of its closer living relatives, the band-tailed pigeon (Patagioenas fasciata). In doing this, they can determine how to modify the DNA of the band-tailed pigeon to change the traits to mimic the traits of the passenger pigeon. In this sense, the de-extinct passenger pigeon would not be genetically identical to the extinct passenger pigeon, but it would have the same traits. In 2015, the de-extinct passenger pigeon hybrid was forecast ready for captive breeding by 2025 and released into the wild by 2030. In October 2024, Revive & Restore collaborated with Applied Ecological Institute to simulate forest disturbances in the American state of Wisconsin to see how trees would react to the reintroduced passenger pigeons. The original 2025 goal was not met, with the new goal for reviving the species for captive breeding set for between 2029 and 2032. However, it could take decades for the species to be reintroduced to the wild.

=== Quagga ===
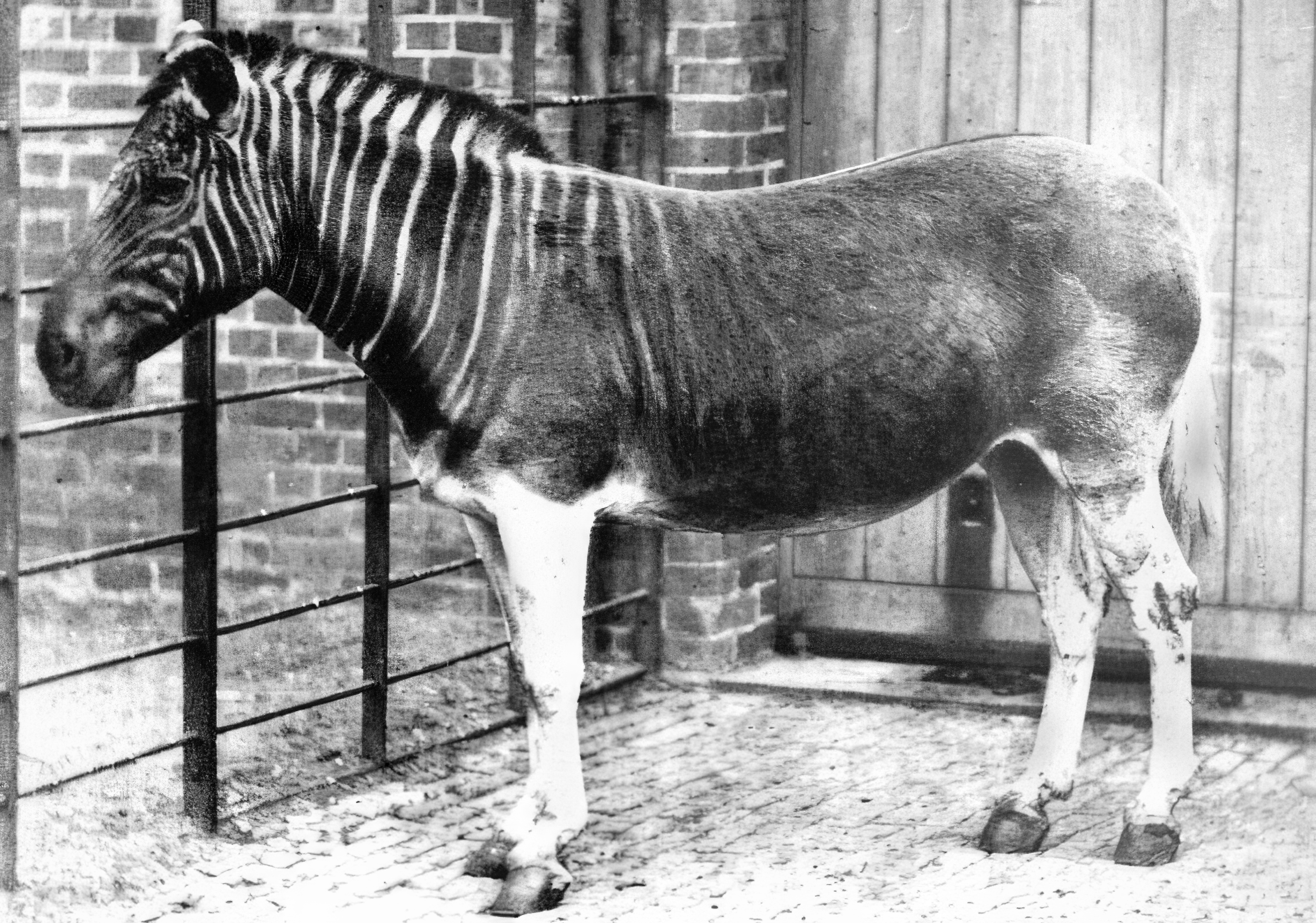
Living quagga, 1870

The quagga (Equus quagga quagga) is a subspecies of the plains zebra that was distinct in that it was striped on its face and upper torso, but its rear abdomen was a solid brown. It was native to South Africa, but was wiped out in the wild due to overhunting for sport, and the last individual died in 1883 in the Amsterdam Zoo. However, since it is technically the same species as the surviving plains zebra, it has been argued that the quagga could be revived through artificial selection. The Quagga Project aims to breed a similar form of zebra by selective breeding of plains zebras. This process is also known as back breeding. It also aims to release these animals onto the western Cape once an animal that fully resembles the quagga is achieved, which could have the benefit of eradicating introduced species of trees such as the Brazilian pepper tree, Tipuana tipu, Acacia saligna, bugweed, camphor tree, stone pine, cluster pine, weeping willow and Acacia mearnsii.

=== Steller's sea cow ===
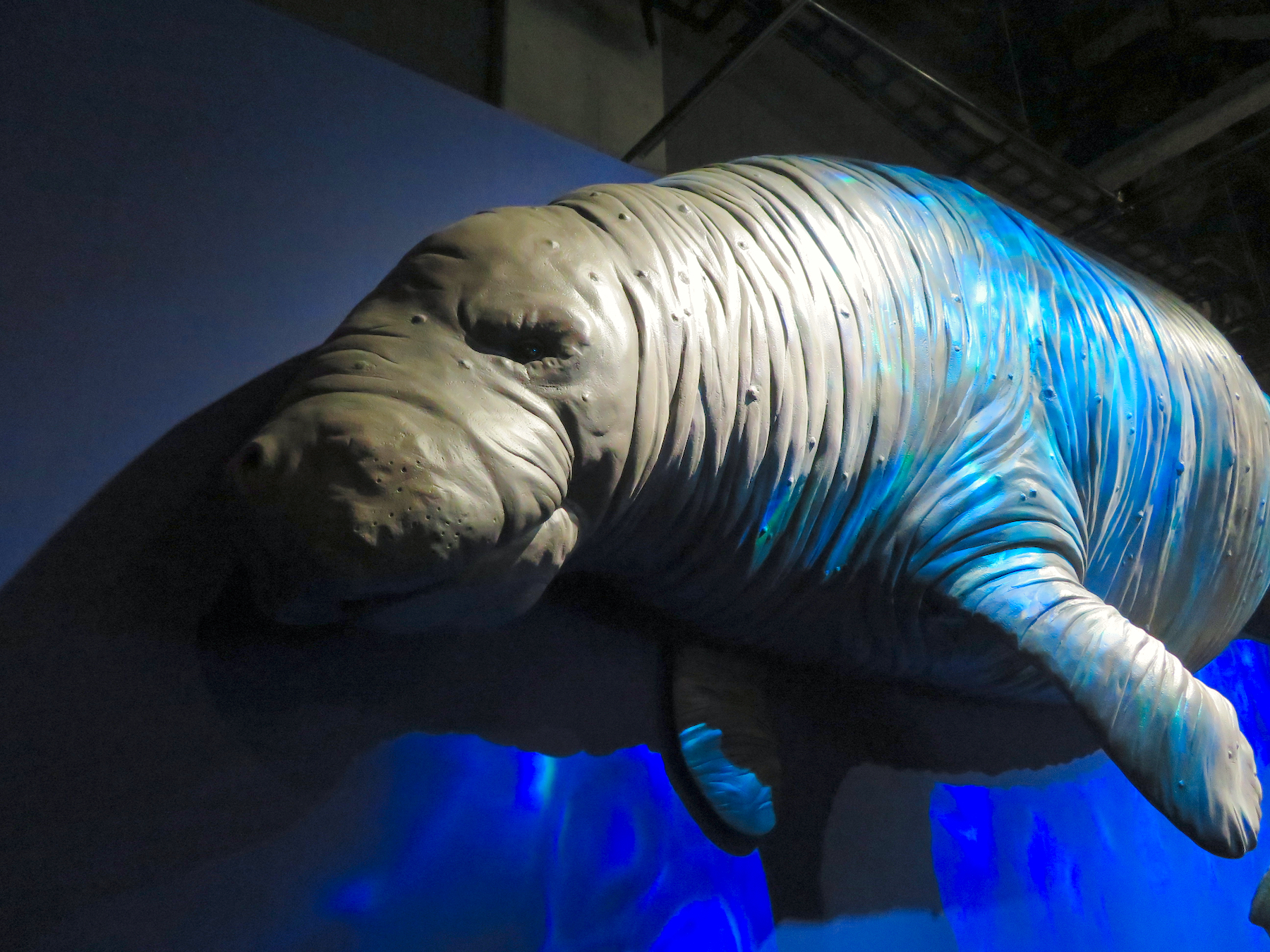
Model of Steller's sea cow

The Steller's sea cow was a sirenian endemic to Bering Sea between Russia and the United States but had a much larger range during the Pleistocene. First described by Georg Wilhelm Steller in 1741, it was hunted to extinction 27 years later due to its buoyancy making it an easy target for humans hunting it for its meat and fur in addition to the population already being small in number. In 2021, the nuclear genome of the species was sequenced. In late 2022, a group of Russian scientists funded by Sergei Bachin began their project to revive and reintroduce the giant sirenian to its former range in the 18th century to restore its kelp forest ecosystem. Arctic Sirenia plans to revive the species through genome editing of the dugong, but they need an artificial womb to conceive a live animal due to lack of an adequate surrogate species.

=== Thylacine ===
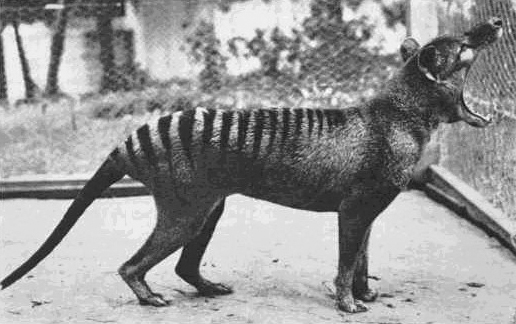
The last known thylacine died from neglect in the Hobart Zoo in 1936.

The thylacine (Thylacinus cynocephalus), commonly known as the Tasmanian tiger, was native to the Australian mainland, Tasmania and New Guinea. It is believed to have become extinct in the 20th century. The thylacine had become extremely rare or extinct on the Australian mainland before British settlement of the continent. The last known thylacine died at the Hobart Zoo, on 7 September 1936. It is believed to have died as the result of neglect—locked out of its sheltered sleeping quarters, it was exposed to a rare occurrence of extreme Tasmanian weather: extreme heat during the day and freezing temperatures at night. Official protection of the species by the Tasmanian government was introduced on 10 July 1936, roughly 59 days before the last known specimen died in captivity.

In December 2017, it was announced in the journal Nature Ecology and Evolution that the full nuclear genome of the thylacine had been successfully sequenced, marking the completion of the critical first step toward de-extinction that began in 2008, with the extraction of the DNA samples from the preserved pouch specimen. The thylacine genome was reconstructed by using the genome editing method. The Tasmanian devil was used as a reference for the assembly of the full nuclear genome. Andrew J. Pask from the University of Melbourne has stated that the next step toward de-extinction will be to create a functional genome, which will require extensive research and development, estimating that a full attempt to resurrect the species may be possible as early as 2027.

In August 2022, the University of Melbourne and Colossal Biosciences announced a partnership to accelerate de-extinction of the thylacine via genetic modification of one of its closest living relatives, the fat-tailed dunnart. In October 2024, Colossal claimed to have reconstructed a 99.9% complete genome of the thylacine from a well-preserved skull estimated to be 110 years old; however, the data has not yet been published.

=== Woolly mammoth ===
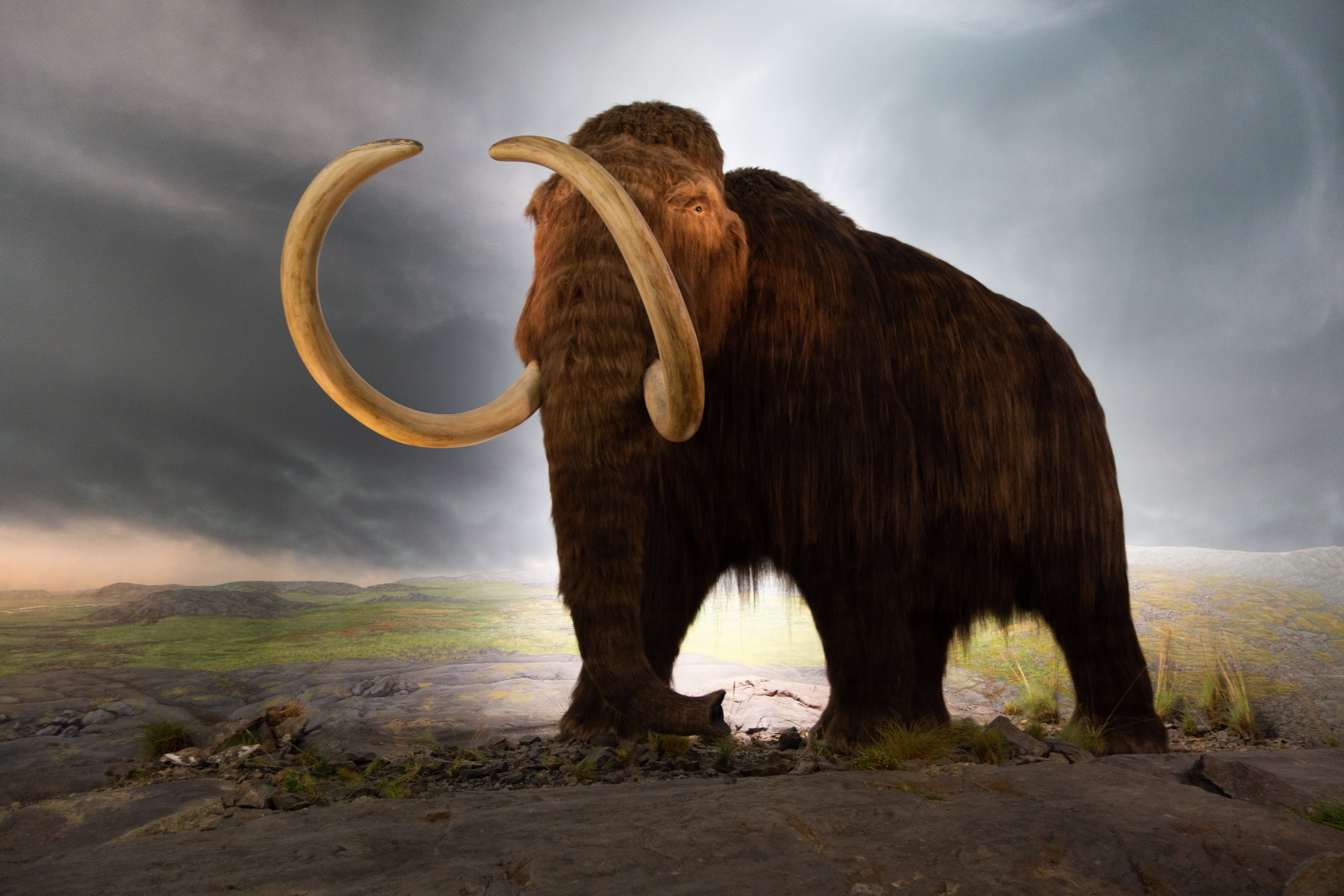
The woolly mammoth is a current prime candidate for de-extinction through cloning or genome editing.

The existence of preserved soft tissue remains and DNA from woolly mammoths (Mammuthus primigenius) has led to the idea that the species could be recreated by scientific means. Two methods have been proposed to achieve this:

The first would be to use the cloning process; however, even the most intact mammoth samples have had little usable DNA because of their conditions of preservation. There is not enough DNA intact to guide the production of an embryo. The second method would involve artificially inseminating an elephant egg cell with preserved sperm of the mammoth. The resulting offspring would be a hybrid of the mammoth and its closest living relative the Asian elephant. After several generations of cross-breeding these hybrids, an almost pure woolly mammoth could be produced. However, sperm cells of modern mammals are typically potent for up to 15 years after deep-freezing, which could hinder this method. Whether the hybrid embryo would be carried through the two-year gestation is unknown; in one case, an Asian elephant and an African elephant produced a live calf named Motty, but it died of defects at less than two weeks old.

In 2008, a Japanese team found usable DNA in the brains of mice that had been frozen for 16 years. They hope to use similar methods to find usable mammoth DNA. In 2011, Japanese scientists announced plans to clone mammoths within six years.

In March 2014, the Russian Association of Medical Anthropologists reported that blood recovered from a frozen mammoth carcass in 2013 would now provide a good opportunity for cloning the woolly mammoth. Another way to create a living woolly mammoth would be to migrate genes from the mammoth genome into the genes of its closest living relative, the Asian elephant, to create hybridized animals with the notable adaptations that it had for living in a much colder environment than modern day elephants. This is currently being done by a team led by Harvard geneticist George Church. The team has made changes in the elephant genome with the genes that gave the woolly mammoth its cold-resistant blood, longer hair, and an extra layer of fat. According to geneticist Hendrik Poinar, a revived woolly mammoth or mammoth-elephant hybrid may find suitable habitat in the tundra and taiga forest ecozones.

George Church has hypothesized the positive effects of bringing back the extinct woolly mammoth would have on the environment, such as the potential for reversing some of the damage caused by global warming. He and his fellow researchers predict that mammoths would eat the dead grass allowing the sun to reach the spring grass; their weight would allow them to break through dense, insulating snow in order to let cold air reach the soil; and their characteristic of felling trees would increase the absorption of sunlight. In an editorial condemning de-extinction, Scientific American pointed out that the technologies involved could have secondary applications, specifically to help species on the verge of extinction regain their genetic diversity.

In March 2025, Colossal Biosciences, a startup founded by George Church with funding from Ben Lamm announced the birth of woolly mice. These mice, while they do not contain almost any mammoth genetic information – most of the edited genes are known mice fur genetic variants, and not woolly mammoth variants –, exhibit some of the key traits of the woolly mammoth, such as cold tolerance and long, shaggy, tawny-toned fur.

=== Yangtze giant softshell turtle ===
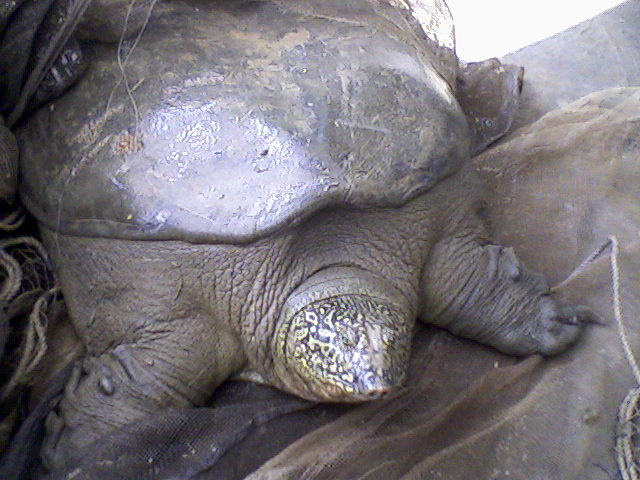
One of the final two remaining wild turtles at Dong Mo Lake in Son Tay, Vietnam

The Yangtze giant softshell turtle (Rafetus swinhoei) is a softshell turtle endemic to China and Vietnam and is possibly the largest living freshwater turtle. Due to various factors such as habitat loss, wildlife trafficking, trophy hunting, and the Vietnam War, the species population has been reduced to only three male individuals, rendering it functionally extinct similar to the northern white rhinoceros and ivory-billed woodpecker. There is one captive individual in Suzhou Zoo in China, and two wild individuals at Dong Mo Lake in Vietnam. Efforts to save the species from extinction through various means of assisted reproduction in captivity have been ongoing since 2009 by the Suzhou Zoo and Turtle Survival Alliance.

Despite efforts to breed the turtles naturally, the eggs laid by the final known female were all infertile and unviable. In May 2015, artificial insemination was performed for the first time in the species. In July of the same year, the female laid 89 eggs, but like all previous natural attempts, they were all unviable. In April 2019, the female individual at the zoo died after another failed artificial insemination attempt. In 2020, a female was discovered in the wild, reigniting hope for the survival of the species. However, this individual was found dead in early 2023. Several searches across China and Vietnam are currently underway to locate female individuals to breed with the final known males, or to undergo artificial insemination.

== Further species considered for de-extinction ==
A "De-extinction Task Force" was established in April 2014 under the auspices of the Species Survival Commission (SSC) and charged with drafting a set of Guiding Principles on Creating Proxies of Extinct Species for Conservation Benefit to position the IUCN SSC on the rapidly emerging technological feasibility of creating a proxy of an extinct species.

=== Birds ===
- Elephant bird – the heaviest birds to have ever lived, the elephant birds were driven to extinction by the early colonization of Madagascar. Ancient DNA has been obtained from the eggshells but may be too degraded for use in de-extinction.

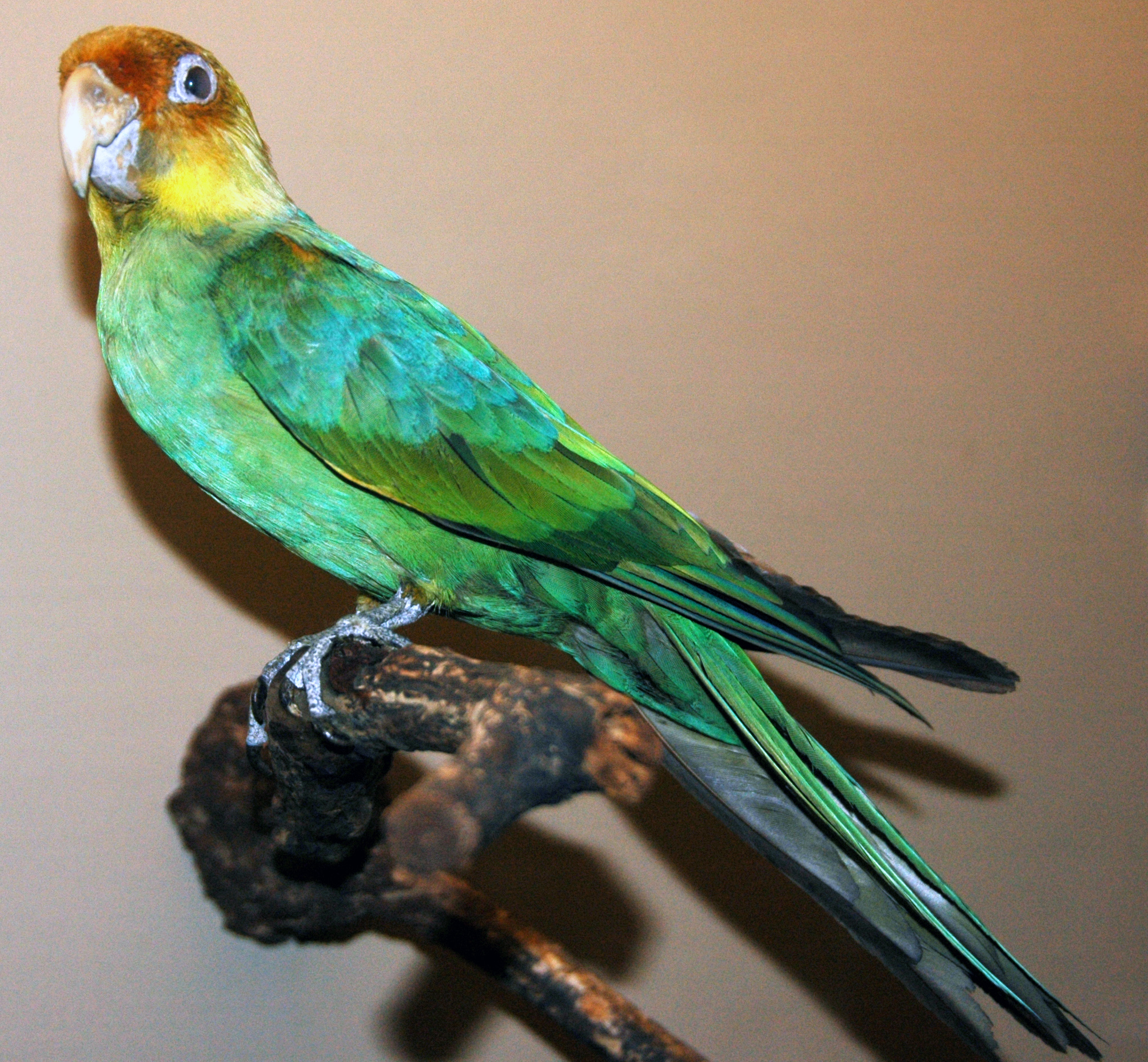
The Carolina parakeet is a prime candidate for de-extinction due to the genome already being sequenced

- Carolina parakeet - one of the few native parrots to the United States, it was driven to extinction by destruction of its habitat, overhunting, competition from introduced honeybees, and persecution for crop damages and declared extinct following the death of its final known member, Incas in 1918. Hundreds of specimens with viable DNA still exist in museums around the world, making it a prime candidate for revival. In 2019, the full genome of the Carolina parakeet was sequenced.
- Great auk - a flightless bird native to the North Atlantic physically similar to penguins. The great auk went extinct in the 1800s due to overhunting by humans for food. The last two known great auks lived on an island near Iceland and were clubbed to death by sailors. There have been no known sightings since. The great auk has been identified as a good candidate for de-extinction by Revive and Restore, a non-profit organization. Because the great auk is extinct it cannot be cloned, but its DNA can be used to alter the genome of its closest relative, the razorbill, and breed the hybrids to create a species that will be very similar to the original great auks. The plan is to introduce them back into their original habitat, which they would then share with razorbills and puffins, who are also at risk for extinction. This would help restore the biodiversity and restore that part of the ecosystem. Colossal Biosciences has also expressed interest in reviving the species.
- Imperial woodpecker – the largest woodpecker to have ever lived. Endemic to Mexico and possibly extinct, it has not been seen since 1956 due to habitat destruction and hunting. The Federal government of Mexico has considered the species extinct since 2001, 47 years after the last widely accepted sighting. However, they have conservation plans if the species is rediscovered or attempts at de-extinction are made.
- Cuban macaw – a colourful macaw that was endemic to Cuba and Isla de la Juventud, it was the only macaw species of the Antilles. It became extinct in the late 19th century due to overhunting, pet trade, and habitat loss.
- Labrador duck – a duck native to North America. it became extinct in the late 19th century due to colonisation in their former range combined with an already naturally low population. It is also the first known endemic North American bird species to become extinct following the Columbian Exchange.

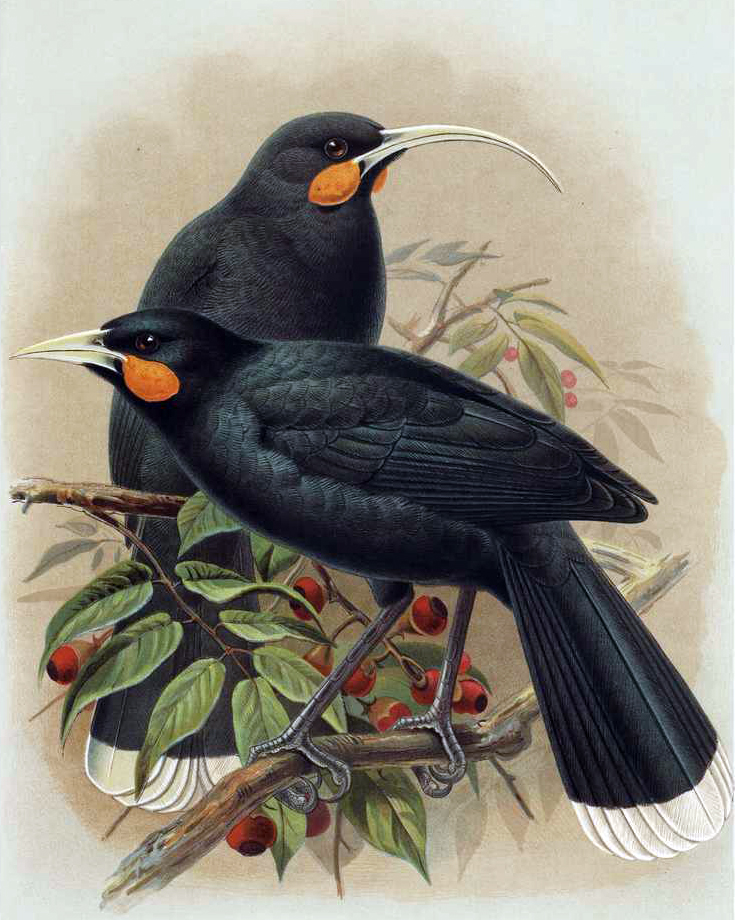
The huia was one of the very first proposed candidates for de-extinction through cloning

- Huia – a species of Callaeidae native to New Zealand. It became extinct in 1907 due to overhunting from both the Māori and European settlers, habitat loss, and predation from introduced invasive species. In 1999, students of Hastings Boys' High School proposed the idea of de-extinction of the huia, the school's emblem through cloning. The Ngāti Huia tribe approved of the idea and the de-extinction process would have been performed by the University of Otago with $100,000 funding from a Californian-based internet startup. However, due to the poor state of DNA in the specimens at Museum of New Zealand Te Papa Tongarewa, a complete huia genome could not be created, making this method of de-extinction improbable to succeed.
- Moho – an entire genus of songbirds that were endemic to the islands of Hawaii. The genus and family became extinct in 1987 following the extinction of its final living member, the Kauaʻi ʻōʻō. The reasons for the genus' decline were overhunting for their plumage, habitat loss caused by colonization of Hawaii, natural disasters, mosquito-borne diseases, and predation from introduced invasive species.

=== Mammals ===
- Caribbean monk seal – a species of monk seal that was native to the Caribbean. It became extinct in 1952 due to poaching and starvation caused by overfishing of its natural prey.
- Bluebuck – a species of antelope that was native to South Africa. The species was hunted to extinction by 1799 or 1800 by Europeans, and the species had a naturally low population similar to the Labrador duck. In 2024, the nuclear genome of the species was sequenced by University of Potsdam and Colossal Biosciences. Colossal Biosciences has also expressed interest in reviving the species in the future.
- Pyrenean ibex – a subspecies of ibex that was native to the Pyrenees, the subspecies was declared extinct in early 2000 following the death of Celia, the endling of the subspecies after two centuries of overhunting and competition with livestock and introduced species. Celia was successfully cloned by Spanish scientists in 2003, but the clone died shortly after its birth due to a lung defect. 10 years later, The Aragon Hunting Federation in collaboration with CITA (Centre for Research and Food Technology of Aragon) began a second attempt to potentially revive the subspecies by verifying if Celia's frozen cells were still viable for future cloning attempts. As of April 2025, no further statements have come out from this project.
- Baiji - a possibly extinct species of river dolphin native to the Yangtze river system in China. It is thought to possibly be the first dolphin species driven to extinction due to the impact of humans.
- Caspian Tiger - tiger subspecies which was native to eastern Turkey, northern Iran, Mesopotamia, the Caucasus around the Caspian Sea, Central Asia to northern Afghanistan and the Xinjiang region in Western China. It inhabited sparse forests and riverine corridors in this region until the 1970s.
- Vaquita – the smallest cetacean to have ever lived; endemic to the upper Gulf of California in Mexico. The vaquita is not completely extinct, but functionally extinct with an estimate of 8 or less members left due to entanglement in gillnets meant to poach totoabas, a fish with a highly valued swim bladder on Asian black markets due to its perceived medicinal values. In October 2024, Colossal Biosciences launched their Colossal Foundation, a non-profit foundation dedicated to conservation of extant species with one of their first projects being the vaquita. In addition to using technology to monitor the final remaining individuals, they aim to collect tissue samples from vaquitas in order to revive it if it does become extinct in the near future.
- Irish elk – the largest deer to have ever lived, formerly inhabiting Eurasia from present day Ireland to present day Siberia during the Pleistocene. It became extinct 5–10 thousand years ago due to suspected overhunting from humans.
- Cave lion – a species of Panthera related to the modern lion found throughout the Holarctic during the Pleistocene. It is estimated that the species died out 14-15 thousand years ago due to climate change and low genetic diversity. The discovery of well-preserved cubs in the Sakha Republic, Russia ignited a project to clone the animal.
- Cave hyena – a species or subspecies of hyena that was endemic to Eurasia during the Pleistocene. It is estimated that the species died out 31 thousand years ago due to competition with early humans and other carnivores and decreased availability of prey.
- Castoroides – an entire genus of giant beavers endemic to North America during the Pleistocene. It is unknown how the species died out, but some suggest that climate change and competition are factors. Beth Shapiro of Colossal Biosciences has expressed interest in reviving a species from this genus.
- Steppe bison – the ancestor species of all modern American bison, formerly endemic to Western Europe to eastern Beringia in North America during the Late Pleistocene. The discovery of the mummified steppe bison of 9,000 years ago could help people clone the ancient bison species back, even though the steppe bison would not be the first to be "resurrected". Russian and South Korean scientists are collaborating to clone steppe bison in the future using DNA preserved from an 8,000-year-old tail and wood bison as a surrogate species, which themselves have been introduced to Yakutia to fulfil a similar niche.
- Longhorn bison – also known as the giant bison, a species of bison native to North America from Southern Canada to Mexico during the Late Pleistocene. It is estimated that the species died out 13,000 years ago, possibly due to pressure from early humans and overhunting.
- Ground sloths – an extremely diverse group of sloths native to the Americas during the Pleistocene with some growing to the size of modern elephants. Ground sloths died out on the mainland 11 thousand years ago, but relict populations in the Caribbean survived until about 4 thousand years ago like the final populations of woolly mammoths on Wrangel island. Ground sloths died out primarily due to climate change and some suspect that their size and slowness made them easy targets for early humans. The insular Caribbean populations were likely driven to extinction through overhunting.
- Woolly rhinoceros – a species of rhinoceros that was endemic to Northern Eurasia during the Pleistocene. It is believed to have become extinct as a result of both climate change and overhunting by early humans. In November 2023, scientists managed to sequence the woolly rhinoceros's genome from faeces of cave hyenas in addition to the existence of mummified specimens.
- Miracinonyx – also known as American cheetahs, an entire genus of felines that were native to North America during the Pleistocene. It is unknown how the genus went extinct, but some suggest that they died out for the same reasons as other North American megafauna; climate change, loss of prey, and competition with early humans and other carnivores.

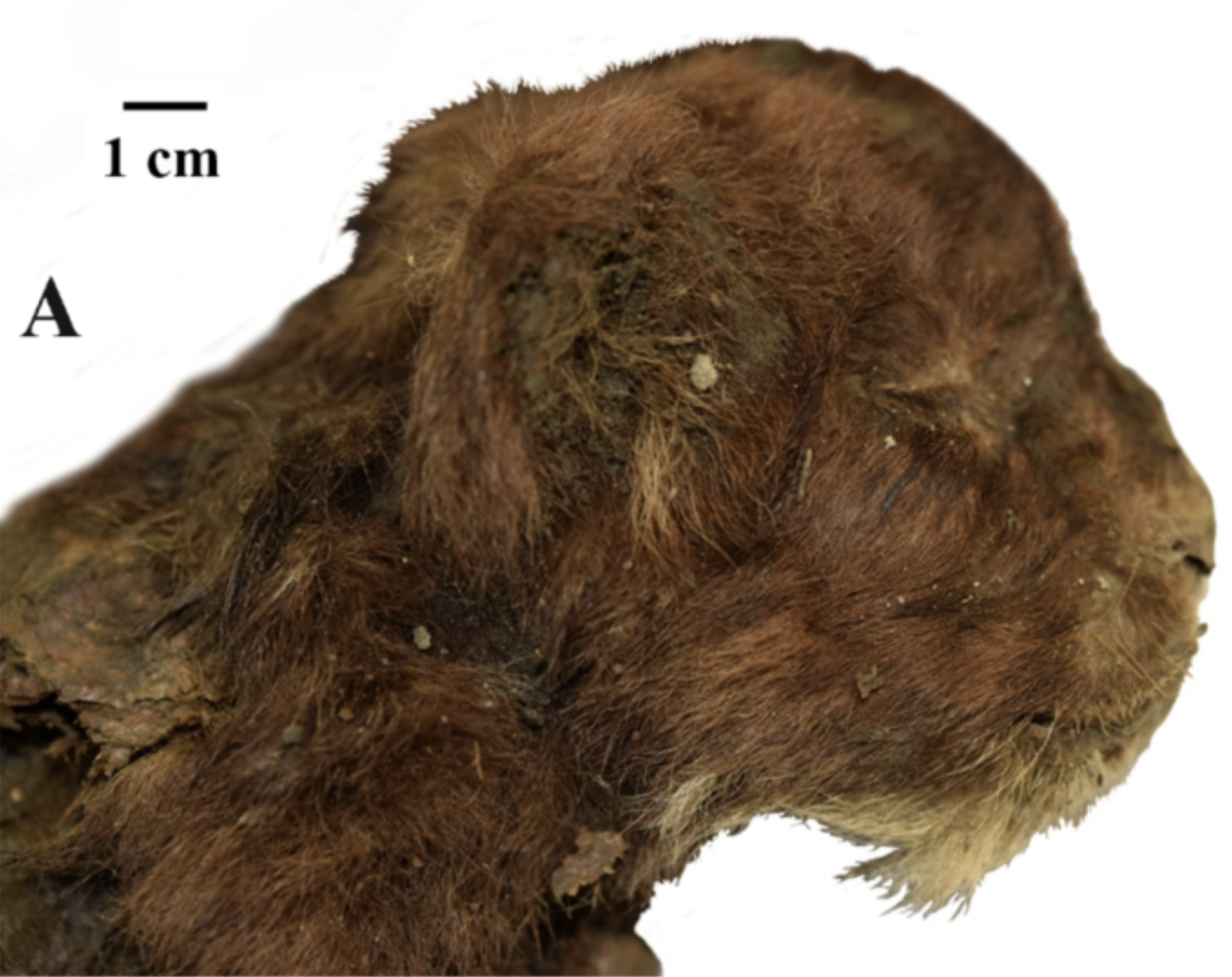
Head of a mummified Homotheirum latidens cub, the only mummified specimen of the entire Machairodontinae subfamily

- Machairodontinae – commonly referred to as sabre-tooth cats or sabre-tooth tigers, an entire subfamily of feline apex predators that were widespread globally with the exceptions of Oceania and Antarctica from the middle Miocene to early Holocene. The final two genera of this subfamily, Smilodon and Homotherium, are estimated to have become extinct during the Quaternary extinction event 10–13 thousand years ago for the same reasons as other carnivorous megafauna. Despite one of their common names, the biggest challenge in the restoration of any species belonging to this subfamily is that they are too genetically distinct from modern big cats, such as tigers. In 2020, a mummified Homotherium latidens cub was discovered in Yakutia, Russia.
- Columbian mammoth – a species of mammoth that was endemic to North America across what are now the United States and northern Mexico. The species became extinct 12 thousand years ago during the Quaternary extinction event due to climate change, overhunting from early humans, and habitat loss.
- Mastodon – an entire genus of proboscideans that were native to North America from the Miocene to the early Holocene. Like the Columbian mammoth, the species became extinct about 11,795 to 11,345 years ago due to climate change, overhunting from early humans, and habitat loss.
- Arctodus – an entire genus of short-faced bears endemic to North America during the Pleistocene. It is estimated that they became extinct 12 thousand years ago following the death of its final member, Arctodus simus due to climate change and low genetic diversity. Beth Shapiro of Colossal Biosciences has expressed interest in reviving one of the two species from the genus.

=== Amphibians ===
- Gastric-brooding frog – A genus of ground-dwelling frogs that were native to Queensland, Australia. They became extinct in the mid-1980s primarily due to chytridiomycosis. They were unique in their reproductive strategy: after external fertilisation, the female swallowed the eggs, brooded the developing young within her stomach (ceasing gastric acid production), and gave birth via the mouth. In 2013, scientists in Australia successfully created a living embryo from non-living preserved genetic material, and hope that by using somatic-cell nuclear transfer methods, they can produce an embryo that can survive to the tadpole stage.

=== Insects ===
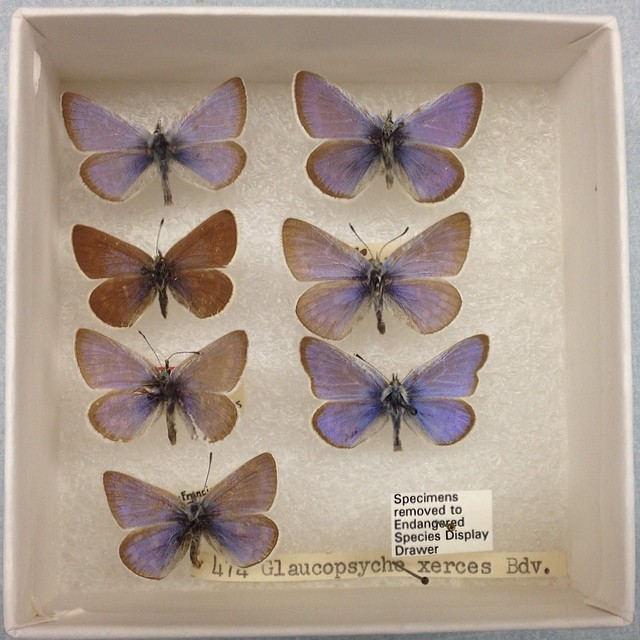
Museum specimens of the Xerces blue, an extinct butterfly

- Xerces blue – A species of butterfly that was native to the Sunset District of San Francisco in the American state of California. It is estimated that the species became extinct in the early 1940s due to urbanization of their former habitat. Similar species to the Xerces blue, such as Glaucopsyche lygdamus and the Palos Verdes blue, have been released into the Xerces blue's former range to substitute its ecological role. On 15 April 2024, non-profit organisation Revive & Restore announced the early stages of their plans to potentially revive the species.

=== Plants ===
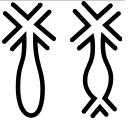
Glyphs of Paschalococos, an extinct genus of palm trees native to Easter Island

- Paschalococos – A genus of coccoid palm trees that were native to Easter Island, Chile. It is believed to have become extinct around 1650 due to overharvesting for its edible nuts and its subsequent disappearance from the pollen records.
- Hyophorbe amaricaulis – A species of palm tree from the Arecales family that is native to the island of Mauritius. Unlike the majority of potential candidates, this palm is not completely extinct, but functionally extinct and is believed to be extinct in the wild with only one known specimen left in the Curepipe Botanic Gardens. In 2010, there was an attempt to revive the species through germination in vitro in which Isolated and growing embryos were extracted from seeds in tissue culture, but these seedlings only lived for three months.

== See also ==
- Arava Institute for Environmental Studies
- Breeding back
- Cryoconservation of animal genetic resources
- Endangered species
- Endling
- Functional extinction
- Holocene extinction
- List of introduced species
- Pleistocene Park
- Pleistocene rewilding
