= TrowelBlazers =

Grouping for women archeo-scientists

- Abbreviation: TB
- Formation: 2019
- Type: Learned society
- Purpose: Women archaeologists, palaeontologists and geologists
- Location: London
- Leader: Brenna Hassett; Victoria Herridge; Suzanne Pilaar Birch; Rebecca Wragg Sykes
- Website: trowelblazers.com

TrowelBlazers is a project aimed at increasing the representation of women in the fields of archaeology, geology and palaeontology. The project is run by Brenna Hassett, Victoria Herridge, Suzanne Pilaar Birch and Rebecca Wragg Sykes.

== Blog ==
TrowelBlazers began as a blog dedicated to women archaeologists, palaeontologists and geologists. As of 2019, the website hosted over 200 biographies. The project originated in a conversation on Twitter, and is noted for utilising a range of digital technologies, including crowdfunding, blogging, digital and print media. Members of TrowelBlazers have written for media outlets such as The Guardian, the BBC History Magazine, and CNN.

== Raising Horizons exhibition ==
An exhibition of photographs, entitled Raising Horizons, taken by Leonora Saunders showcased the diversity of archaeology and geoscience. The exhibition contained portraits of 14 contemporary female scientists, dressed as their historical counterpart. The exhibition displayed at the Geological Society in 2017 and 2019, the British Science Festival, the University Women's Club, London, the Alexander Keiller Museum and the Women Firsts Reception, UK Parliament.

== TrowelBlazers ==
Trowel-blazing women featured on the website include:

=== A-C ===
- Leslie Aiello
- Bridget Allchin
- Lucy Allen
- Harriett M. Allyn
- Ella Al-Shamahi
- Elizabeth Anderson Gray
- Mary Anning
- Zonia Baber
- Lady Mary Bailey
- M. Louise Baker
- Elizabeth Baldwin Garland
- Florence Bascom
- Dorothea Bate
- Betty Baume Clark
- Elise Baumgartel
- Kay Behrensmeyer
- Gertrude Bell
- Etheldred Benett
- Margaret Benson
- Sally Binford
- Caroline Birley
- Nicole Boivin
- Natalya Borisovna Chernykh
- Harriet Boyd Hawes
- Linda Braidwood
- Adela Breton
- Titia Brongersma
- Peggy Brunache
- Winifred Brunton
- Mary Buckland
- Mary Butler
- Halet Çambel
- Beatrice de Cardi, OBE
- Marie Carmichael Stopes
- Gertrude Caton Thompson
- Constanza Ceruti
- Agatha Christie
- Mary Chubb
- Cornelia Clermont Cameron
- Isabel Clifton Cookson
- Madeleine Colani
- Jane Colwell-Danis
- Margaret Conkey
- Helena of Constantinople
- Agnes Conway Horsfield
- Gudrun Corvinus
- Molly Cotton
- Rosemary Cramp
- Dorothy Crowfoot Hodgkin
- Maud Cunnington
- Ethel Currie
- Maria Antonina Czaplicka

=== D-G ===
- Princess Dashkova
- Hester Davis
- Mary Dawson
- Frederica de Laguna
- Camilla Dickson
- Jane Dieulafoy
- Emily Dix
- Jane Donald Longstaff
- Lady Eliza D'Oyly Burroughs
- Henrietta Drake-Brockman
- Angela von den Driesch
- Lindsay Eaves
- Tilly Edinger
- Amelia Edwards
- Dianne Edwards
- Mary Ross Ellingson
- Marina Elliott
- Claire Epstein
- Ufuk Esin
- Shahina Farid
- Elen Feuerriegel
- Ayana Flewellen
- Lady Aileen Fox
- Honor Frost
- Dorothy Garrod
- Marie Garstang
- Ione Gedye
- Marija Gimbutas
- Janet Glassbrook
- Winifred Goldring
- Anjali Goswami
- Alice Gorman
- Maria Graham
- Eileen Guppy
- Alia Gurtov
- Margarete Gütschow
- Virginia Grace

=== H-L ===
- Laila Haglund
- Mary Harfield
- Katerina Harvati
- Emilie Haspels
- Barbara Hastings
- Nancy Hatch Dupree
- Jacquetta Hawkes
- Margaret Hems
- Dorothy Hill
- Mary Horner Lyell
- Hildegarde Howard
- Asma Ibrahim
- Salima Ikram
- Alexandra Jones
- Margaret Ursula Jones
- Elsie Jury
- Nadezhda Kalugina
- Semni Karouzou
- Solmaz Kashkay
- Kathleen Kenyon
- Zofia Kielan-Jaworowska
- Mary Kingsley
- Alice Kober
- Baldyrgan Seralievna Kozhamkulova
- Elena Efimovna Kuzmina
- Annette Laming
- Nina Layard
- Frida Leakey
- Mary Leakey
- Maeve Leakey
- Inge Lehmann
- Dorothy Liddell
- Glenys Lloyd-Morgan
- Nieves López Martínez

=== M-P ===
- Christian Maclagan
- Lady Rachel Workman MacRobert
- Isabel McBryde
- Catherine McCann
- Margaret McKelvy Bird
- Johanna Mestorf
- Elaine Morgan
- Hannah Morris
- Charlotte Murchison
- Margaret Murray
- Tina Negus
- Zelia Nutall
- Francisca Oboh-Ikuenobe
- Alicia Odewale
- Mihriban Özbaşaran
- Women of the Palestine Exploration Fund
- Maria Rita Palombo
- Sarah Parcak
- Bertha “Birdie” Parker
- Becca Peixotto
- Hilda Petrie
- Elizabeth Pettigrew
- Anne Phillips
- Elizabeth Philpot
- Annie Pirie Quibell
- Joan du Plat Taylor
- Natalia Viktorovna Polosmak
- Tatiana Proskouriakoff
- Galina Pugachenkova

=== Q-S ===
- Isabel Ramírez Castañeda
- Catherine Alice Raisin
- Shereen Ratnagar
- Virgínia Rau
- Emily Rayfield
- Emma Reh
- Maria Reiche
- Katherine Routledge
- Charlotte Roberts
- Karen Rubinson
- Margaret Rule
- Jean Sassoon
- Kathy Schick
- Margarethe Lenore Selenka
- Veronica Seton-Williams
- Beth Shapiro
- Margaret B E Shinnie
- Joanna Sofaer
- Sharada Srinivasan
- Magdalina Stancheva
- Lady Hester Stanhope
- Freya Stark
- Norah Dowell Stearns
- Marie Louise Stig Sørensen
- Ellen Stofan
- Brenda Swinbank

=== T-Z ===
- Maisie Taylor
- Marie Tharp
- Marguerite Thomas Williams
- Mabel E. Tomlinson
- Ruth Tringham
- Olga Tufnell
- Annie Ure
- Blaire Van Valkenburgh
- Helen Vaughn Michel
- Mary Vaux Walcott (Burgess Shale Trowelblazers)
- Kamilla Vasil’evna Trever
- Magdolna Vicze
- Patricia Vinnicombe
- Elisabeth Vrba
- Helen Walcott (Burgess Shale Trowelblazers)
- Helena Walcott (Burgess Shale Trowelblazers)
- Frances Wagner
- Carol Ward
- Patty Jo Watson
- Elizabeth Wayland Barber
- Gussie White
- Lisa White
- Joan Wiffen
- Audrey Williams
- Alice Wilson
- Peggy Wilson
- Mary “Polly” Winearls Porter
- Ann Wintle
- Margaret Wood
- Mary Ann Woodhouse Mantell
- Hannah Marie Wormington
- Katharine Woolley
- Aslıhan Yener
- Yusra
- Tatyana Alexandrovna Zhdanko
- Zheng Zhenxiang
- Adrienne Zihlman
