= Steppe Sisters =

International organisation

- Formation: 2017
- Founder: Ashleigh Haruda; Alicia Ventresca-Miller
- Website: https://www.steppesisters.org/

Steppe Sisters is an international network and learned society that promotes the work of women and those of marginalised genders who research the human sciences in Central Asia and surrounding countries.

Founded in 2017 by Ashleigh Haruda and Alicia Ventresca-Miller, it was initially conceived as a support network for researchers. Its steering committee expanded in 2020, and the same year the network undertook a takeover of the TrowelBlazers blog, highlighting archaeologists and earth scientists who worked in the region, including Galina Pugachenkova, Kamilla Trever, Elena Efimovna Kuzmina, Natalia Polosmak, Solmaz Kashkay, Johanna Mestorf, Baldyrgan Kozhamkulova, Natalya Chernykh, and Tatiana Zhdanko.

In 2021, Dilnoza Duturaeva - on behalf of the network - was awarded funding from the Humboldt Foundation, which enabled the construction of a website, grants for open access publication and funding for its first conference. The conference was held at the National Center of Archaeology in Uzbekistan. By 2023 its research community counted over 250 members globally. Its first annual general meeting was held at the University of York.
