= Colwell (surname) =

Colwell is an English surname. Notable people with the surname include:

- Anna Colwell (1876–1941), American politician
- Bob Colwell (born 1954), American electrical engineer
- Carlton H. Colwell (1926–2021), American politician
- Dave Colwell (born 1964), English rock guitarist
- Eileen Colwell (1904–2002), English librarian
- Elizabeth Colwell (1881–1954), American printmaker, typographer and writer
- Ernest Cadman Colwell (1901–1974), American biblical scholar, textual critic and palaeographer
- Frederick Colwell (fl. 1970s–2020s), American microbiologist
- Guy Colwell (born 1945), American painter and cartoonist
- Jack Colwell (1989–2024), Australian singer-songwriter
- James Colwell (1860–1930), English-born Australian Methodist minister and historian
- Jason Colwell (born 1974), Irish footballer
- Jeffrey Colwell (born 1965), American lawyer
- Keith Colwell (born 1947), Canadian politician
- Maria Colwell (1965–1973), British female murder victim
- Oliver Colwell (1834–1862), Union Army officer and Medal of Honor recipient
- Otis Colwell (born c. 1797), American merchant and politician
- Patrick Colwell (born c. 1951), American politician
- Rita R. Colwell (born 1934), American environmental microbiologist and scientific administrator

== See also ==
- Jane Colwell-Danis (born 1941), American paleontologist
