= T. Rex Autopsy =

2015 American TV special

- British release poster
- Directed by: Richard Dale
- Starring: Tori Herridge; Matthew Mossbrucker; Luke Gamble; Stephen Brusatte
- Country of origin: United States
- Original language: English

Production
- Producer: Paul Wooding
- Running time: 90 mins

Original release
- Release: June 7, 2015

T. Rex Autopsy is a 2015 documentary airing on the National Geographic channel where a team of four paleontologists dissect a fiberglass, latex, and silicone rubber replica of Tyrannosaurus. The four paleontologists were Tori Herridge, Stephen Brusatte, Matthew T. Mossbrucker and Luke Gamble, who is the lead anatomist. The T. rex was based on the most complete fossil, "Sue".
