= Culwell =

Culwell is a surname. Notable people with the surname include:

- Ben Culwell (1918–1992), American painter
- Ryan Culwell (born 1980), American musician

== See also ==
- Calwell
- Colwell (surname)
