= Betty Clark =

Betty Clark may refer to:

- Betty Baume Clark (1915–2002), British archaeologist, illustrator, and museum curator
- Betty Jean Clark (1920–2005), member of the Iowa House of Representatives
