= Colwell =

Colwell may refer to:

== Places ==
- Colwell, Northumberland, England
- Colwell Bay, Isle of Wight, England
- Colwell, Iowa, United States

== Other uses ==
- Colwell (surname), a surname
