= The Rise and Fall of the Dinosaurs =

2018 nonfiction book by Steve Brusatte

- Author: Steve Brusatte
- Illustrator: Todd Marshall
- Subject: Evolution and extinction of dinosaurs
- Publisher: Mariner Books
- Publication date: 2018
- Pages: 416
- ISBN: 978-0-06-249043-8

The Rise and Fall of the Dinosaurs: A New History of a Lost World is a 2018 book by paleontologist Steve L. Brusatte. The book chronicles the evolution of dinosaurs, their rise as the dominant clade, and ends with an account of the extinction of the non-avian dinosaurs from the Chicxulub asteroid. It also includes a discussion of the evolution of feathered dinosaurs and the recognition of birds as dinosaurs, and an epilogue of sorts discussing the post-dinosaur emergence of mammals. Brusatte includes anecdotes from his own dinosaur-obsessed childhood and his fieldwork and research, as well as descriptions of other historical and modern paleontologists responsible for various discoveries.

It received strongly positive reviews, praising the author's enthusiasm, vivid writing, and up-to-date research. A few reviewers criticized the focus on big-name dinosaurs such as Tyrannosaurus at the expense of breadth and the focus on anecdotes from Brusatte's life.

== Background and publication ==
The author, Steve Brussatte, is a paleontologist at the University of Edinburgh. A review in The Times described him as "a man who ranks as one of the leading experts in his field ... who seems to have studied with all the greats and to have dug up fossils everywhere that matters." He became interested in dinosaurs as a teenager, not a young child like many palaeontologists, so he read adult popular science books, which he described as a "gateway into science". He wanted to write an up-to-date overview book on dinosaurs that would fill that niche and cover new discoveries, especially about the origins and early years of the clade, which hadn't been written about yet for non-expert adult readers.

The Rise and Fall of the Dinosaurs was Brusatte's first popular science book for an adult audience, but he had written a number of articles and several children's books. It was published in 2018 by Mariner Books, an imprint of HarperCollins. The cover was designed by Mumtaz Mustafa and illustrated by Todd Marshall.

== Content ==
The book begins with the evolution of proto-dinosaurs and dinosaurs' emergence from the Permian-Triassic extinction. The early dinosaurs were not very successful. They became the dominant animals at the beginning of the Jurassic period, which was marked by a mass extinction of many of their competitors. After covering this evolution, Brusatte discusses the speciation of dinosaurs in the Jurassic, with an especial focus on sauropods. The author then spends two chapters describing the evolution and characteristics of Tyrannosaurus rex and its ancestors, his "favorite dinosaur".

In the next chapter he emphasizes that dinosaurs did not go extinct, but rather continue today as birds. He covers various discoveries of feathered dinosaurs, how the scientific consensus came to agree that they were the ancestors of modern birds, and the evolution of wings and flight.

The last chapter deals with the extinction of the non-avian dinosaurs, with a detailed description of the first few days after the asteroid impact that scientists now believe caused their extinction and the longer-term climate effects. He also discusses why the non-avian dinosaurs died out while other animals did not, the history of scientific understanding of the causes of dinosaur extinction, and competing theories. The epilogue covers the rise of mammals after the dinosaur extinction, the subject of Brusatte's next book The Rise and Reign of the Mammals. Brusatte also uses the extinction of the non-avian dinosaurs to comment on the possible effects of modern climate change.

== Reception ==
The Rise and Fall of the Dinosaurs was a New York Times bestseller.

Reviewers generally praised Brusatte's writing, with several calling it "vivid". His ability to bring to life the historical landscapes that would have been inhabited by the dinosaurs he writes about was especially singled out by multiple reviewers. The Christian Science Monitor praised his "narrative exuberance" and "completely winning blend of technical expertise and storytelling ability".

Several other reviewers commented on the author's command of modern research and skill in communicating it simply to a non-technical audience. Holland called it a "readable and up-to-date survey of the current state of palaeontological knowledge" which "grippingly ... demonstrates the quickening pace of research" and declared it the best overview book on dinosaurs for a general audience since the 1986 The Dinosaur Heresies. Oliver Moody at The Times likewise praised Brusatte's "steering a course between pedantry and patronizing oversimplification with flair". A review in Systematic Biology strongly praises the source notes at the end of the book, in which Brusatte provides a brief summary of the primary sources he uses.

Brusatte focuses heavily on anecdotes about modern paleontologists from his own life, leading one review to call the book "part autobiography and part popular science". This split reviewers, with Steve Donoghue at the Christian Science Monitor enjoying the stories and Ira Flatow writing for The New York Times saying they "made the book special", while Moody writes that "there are too many humdrum anecdotes ... He is also so nice about his colleagues that it makes you long for a juicy academic vendetta or some Lucky Jim-style campus theatrics". A review in Systematic Biology complains that the book "at times seems a review of his and his colleagues' accomplishments" but nevertheless calls it overall "captivating".

In his review, Tim Fedak wrote: "a new generation of scientists, including paleontologists, will be inspired by this new dawn of popular science writing."

Several reviewers criticized Brusatte's focus on T. rex and other "celebrity" clades, with one reviewer complaining that they "got somewhat out-T. rexed".

In a rare negative review, Verlyn Klinkenborg criticizes Brusatte's popular science metaphors. He describes the book as "a lost world of [Brusatte's] own, where metaphors war anachronistically in defiance of what scientists understand".
