= John Chubb (artist) =

British artist (1746–1818)

John Chubb (1746-1818) was an amateur artist from Bridgwater in the English county of Somerset. He was born in 1746. His parents were Jonathan Chubb (1715-1805), a Bridgwater timber and wine merchant, and his wife Mary Morley, (1715-1787). John did not become a professional artist, but kept his work private. He helped run the family business, and took an active part in town politics in the Whig cause, and was Mayor of Bridgwater in 1788. He was active in the local campaign to abolish the Slave Trade.

== Biography of the Chubb family ==
Jonathan Chubb (1715-1805) was the son of James Chubb (born 1691?) and his wife Elinor Venicot. He was related to the family of Thomas Chubb The Deist, and through his mother to the mother of the actress and author Mary Robinson (poet). Jonathan Chubb was a merchant, importing wine, timber, coopers' supplies such as barrel staves and also builders' supplies such as glass and tiles.

He married Mary Morley (1715-1787) of North Petherton, and she had links with a number of the local gentry, such as the Luttrells of Dunster. They had three children, John, Kitty, (b 1748), who married the Rev David Webber, and Sarah, (b 1751), who married Captain Thomas Morris.

John Chubb was born in Bridgwater 9 May 1746. A precocious child, John displayed a talent for art but did not take it up professionally. By 1778 he was a burgess and so a councillor, and was elected Mayor of Bridgwater in 1788. He was a Radical and supported the Whig cause, and was active in promoting Bridgwater's anti-slavery petition to Parliament in 1785. He was one of the promoters of Bridgwater Infirmary, and served as treasurer to the time of his death in 1818.

He married Mary Wetherell (1765-1812), from Wells, and they had three children, Morley (1788-1855), Lucy (1794-1867) and Charles James (1797-1872). John Chubb died 2 February 1818, after an illness lasting two years. They were a musical family, and music features in his in art.

Morley Chubb succeeded to the family business. He married Frances Alford, (1788-1850) and they had 14 children, all but the youngest born in Bridgwater, — nine boys and five girls. Morley Chubb, Charles James Chubb and John Bowen entered into a partnership to own a wine merchants' business under the name of M. Chubb & Co in Bridgwater. This was dissolved in June 1830 in favour of John Bowen By 1832 the family had moved to London, and were living in Burton Street, Islington. The 1841 census records him as a 'Professor of Music', and the 1851 the secretary of a commercial company—The Crosse Patent Co. Very little is known of his life in London, but after his death, in 1858 was published his translation into English of the words of Louis Spohr's " God, Thou art great ": opus 98, a sacred cantata for four voices, 1836.

Morley's eldest son, John Chubb, (1813-1859), attorney and solicitor, of Cirencester, married Caroline Tudway, in 1838 and died 1859. He was also a talented amateur artist.

Thomas Alford Chubb,(1815-1883), the second son, was secretary, and afterwards treasurer, to the South Eastern Railway Company. He married Margaret Lyon, and died in 1883, leaving four sons, the youngest being John Burland Chubb, (1861-1951), F.R.I.B.A., of London. The latter was the father of Mary Chubb, (1903-2003), archaeologist, writer and historian of the family.

The third son, Harry, (1816-1888) was prominent in the management of a number of coal-gas companies and railways in London, and was a member of the Institution of Civil Engineers. He married a daughter of the inventor Jacob Perkins. He died in 1888.

The sixth son, Arthur, was a BA of Pembroke College, Cambridge. He died at the house of his brother, John, in 1852 aged 29

Of the other sons, Hammond Chubb (1829-1904) was for 30 years secretary to the Bank of England, (which he had joined in 1847) and died in 1904 aged 75.

Lucy Chubb was unmarried and she ran a school, in Castle Street, Bridgwater in 1830, and later moved to London to join her brother, where she died in 1867.

Charles James Chubb, named for John Chubb's friend Charles James Fox, was also unmarried, and by 1841 had moved to The Midlands where he was appointed chief cashier and book keeper of Boulton and Watt's Soho Manufactory at Smethwick. On his retirement 1863 he also moved to London, where he died in 1872.

== The paintings and drawings ==
Nearly 400 sketches and finished drawings and a number of documents survived John Chubb's death and remained with the family. There are portraits of John Chubb's immediate family, portraits of Bridgwater worthies, unidentified portraits and topographical paintings. A number of the latter are by John Chubb's descendants. The manuscripts are mainly family letters, some from the 17th century, letters to John Chubb and a few relating to his descendants in the nineteenth century. The Blake Museum had long possessed a number of John Chubb's topographical paintings of the town, donated by John Burland Chubb in the late 1920s, and from 1977, sixty of the portraits of local worthies had been on loan from the family to the museum. The family offered the entire collection to the Museum, and in 2004 Blake Museum reached its appeal target of £123,000.

John Chubb's topographical work shows Bridgwater streets and buildings, and his portraits are of his family and local worthies. A number of the paintings feature pretty girls in ornate hats. His portraits of tradesmen and craftsmen include their tools, rather like the Books of Trades of earlier centuries. There are more portraits than topographical paintings. Some time in the early C19 lithographic prints were made of about a dozen of his paintings of Bridgwater scenes, and these are fully represented in the Museum's collection. They were probably by his grandson, John Chubb the younger, also a talented artist. A letter (in the Chubb MS in the Somerset Record Office) which he wrote to his father, Morley, in 1835, mentions him having drawings reproduced as prints by Charles Joseph Hullmandel, the foremost lithographic printer of the time.

The collection includes letters from Charles James Fox, and Samuel Taylor Coleridge. There are also papers concerning the family business. The manuscripts have been deposited at the Somerset Heritage Centre Archive, Taunton.

The Museum has a permanent gallery about John Chubb, his life and his work. All the portraits have been digitised in TIFF format, and prints may be consulted in albums there.

The following is a small selection of the images in the collection. Click on each to discover more detail.

=== Gallery - Paintings ===
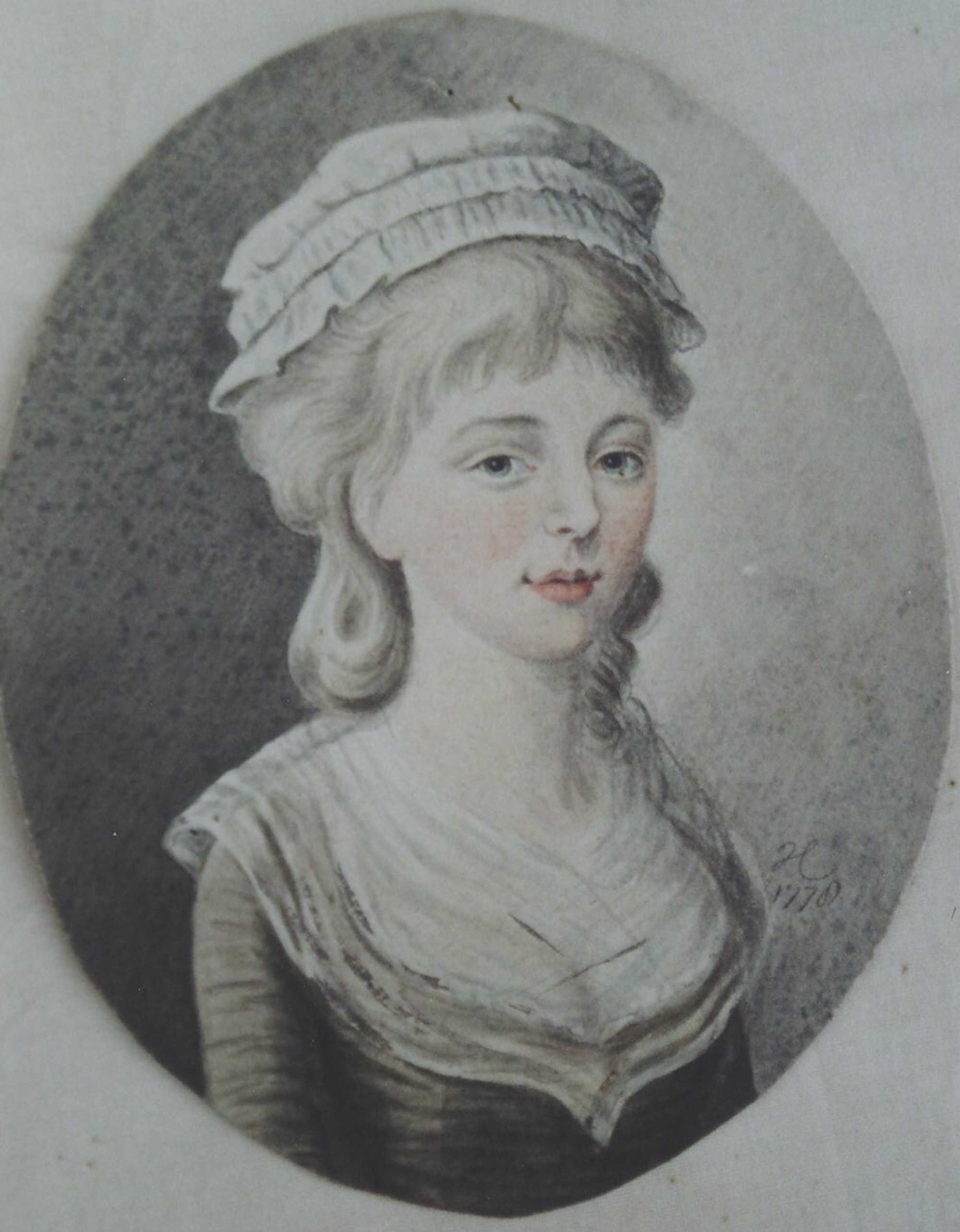

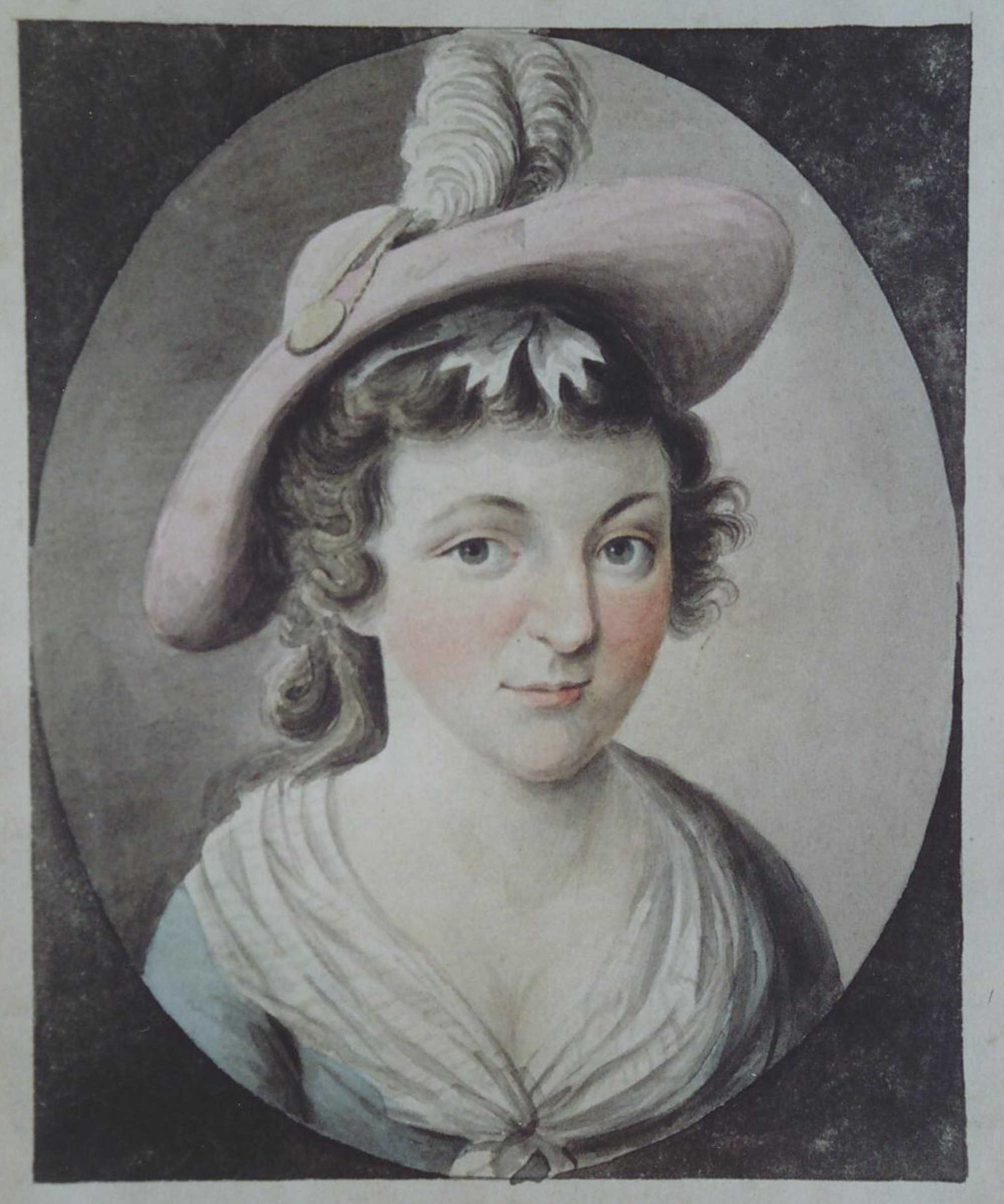

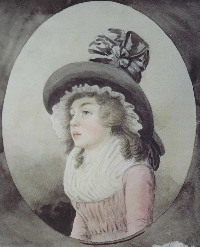

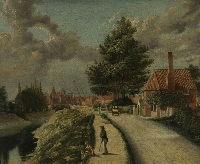

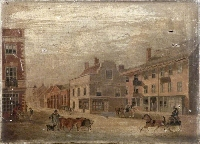

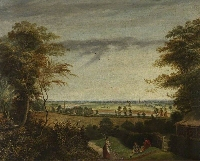

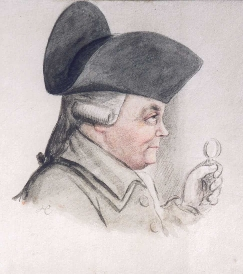

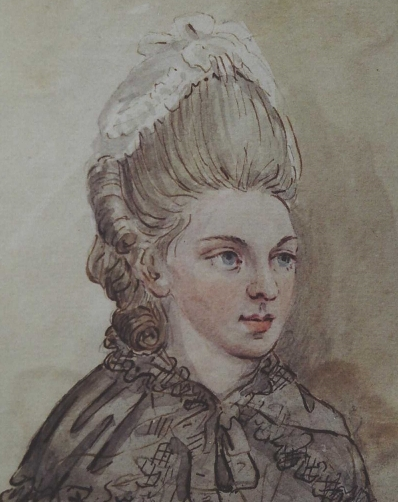

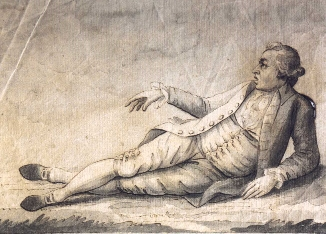

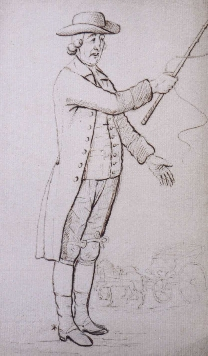

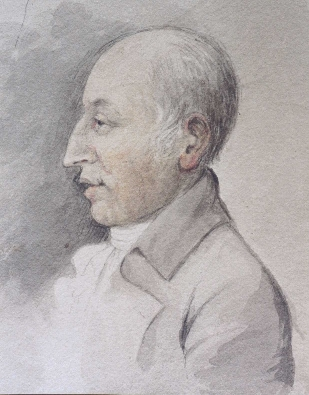

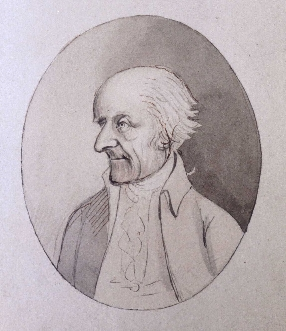

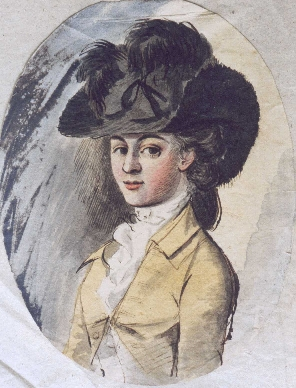

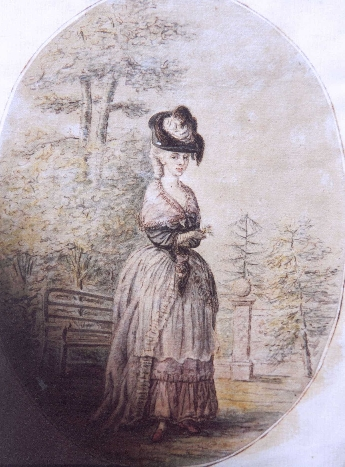

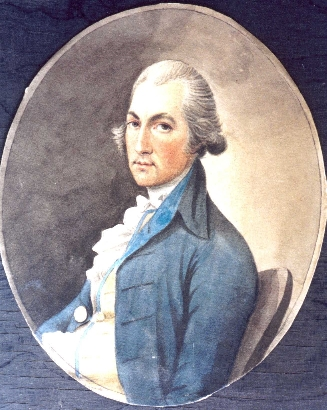

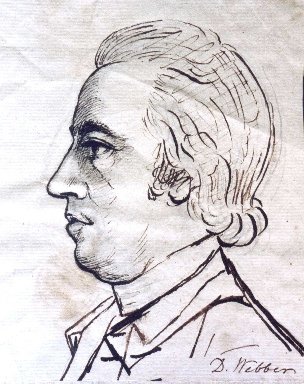

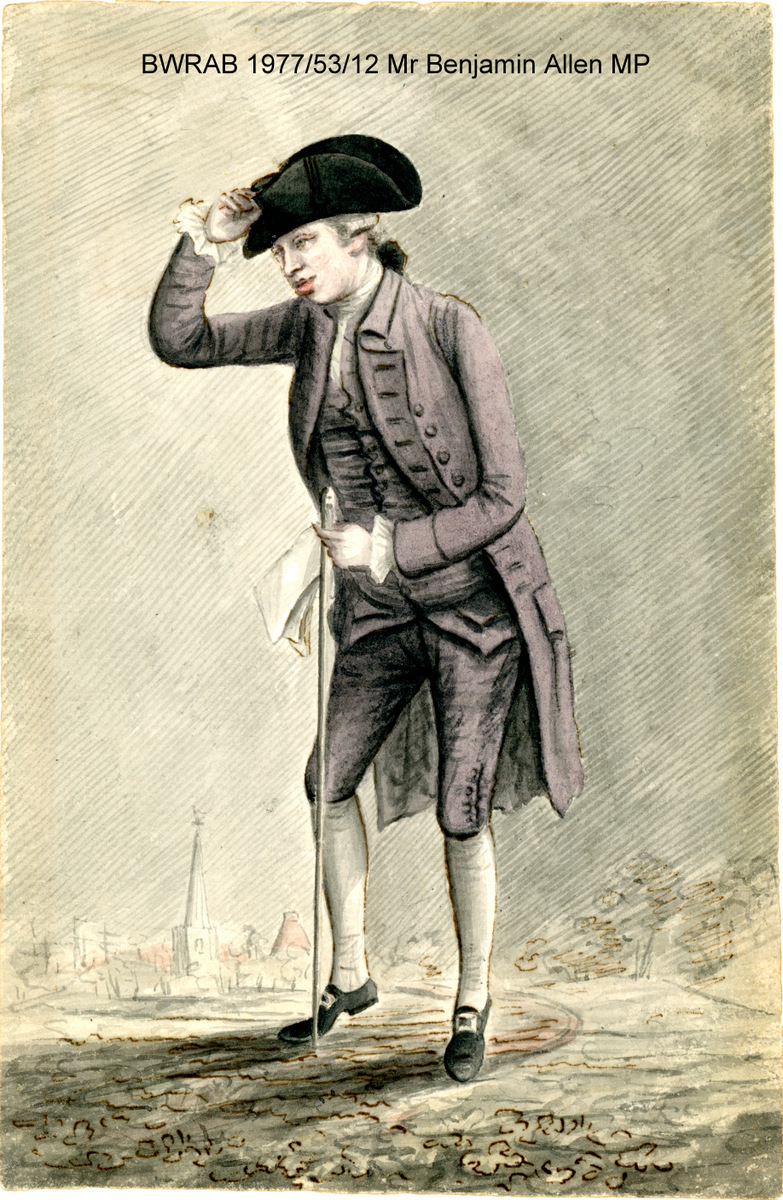

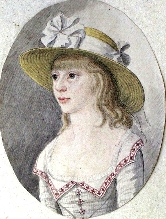

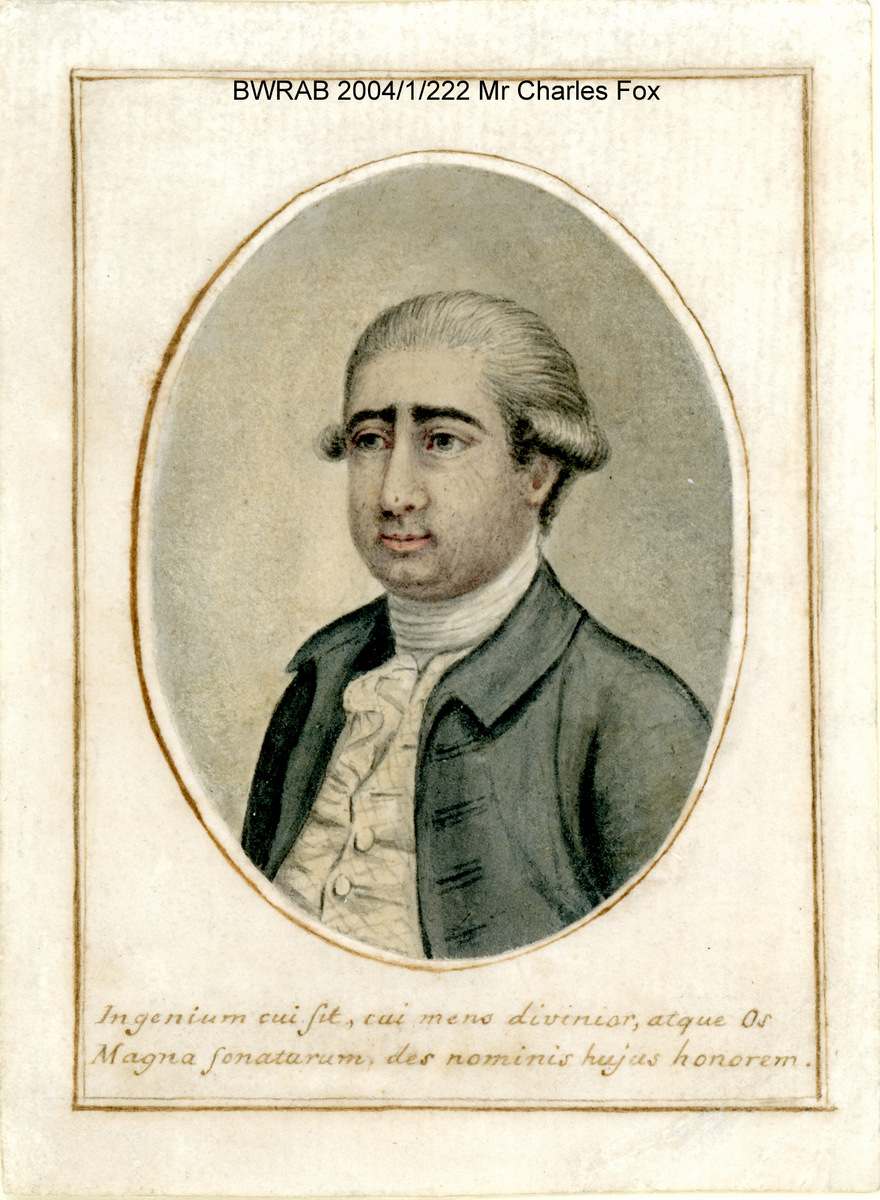

=== Gallery - Lithographs ===
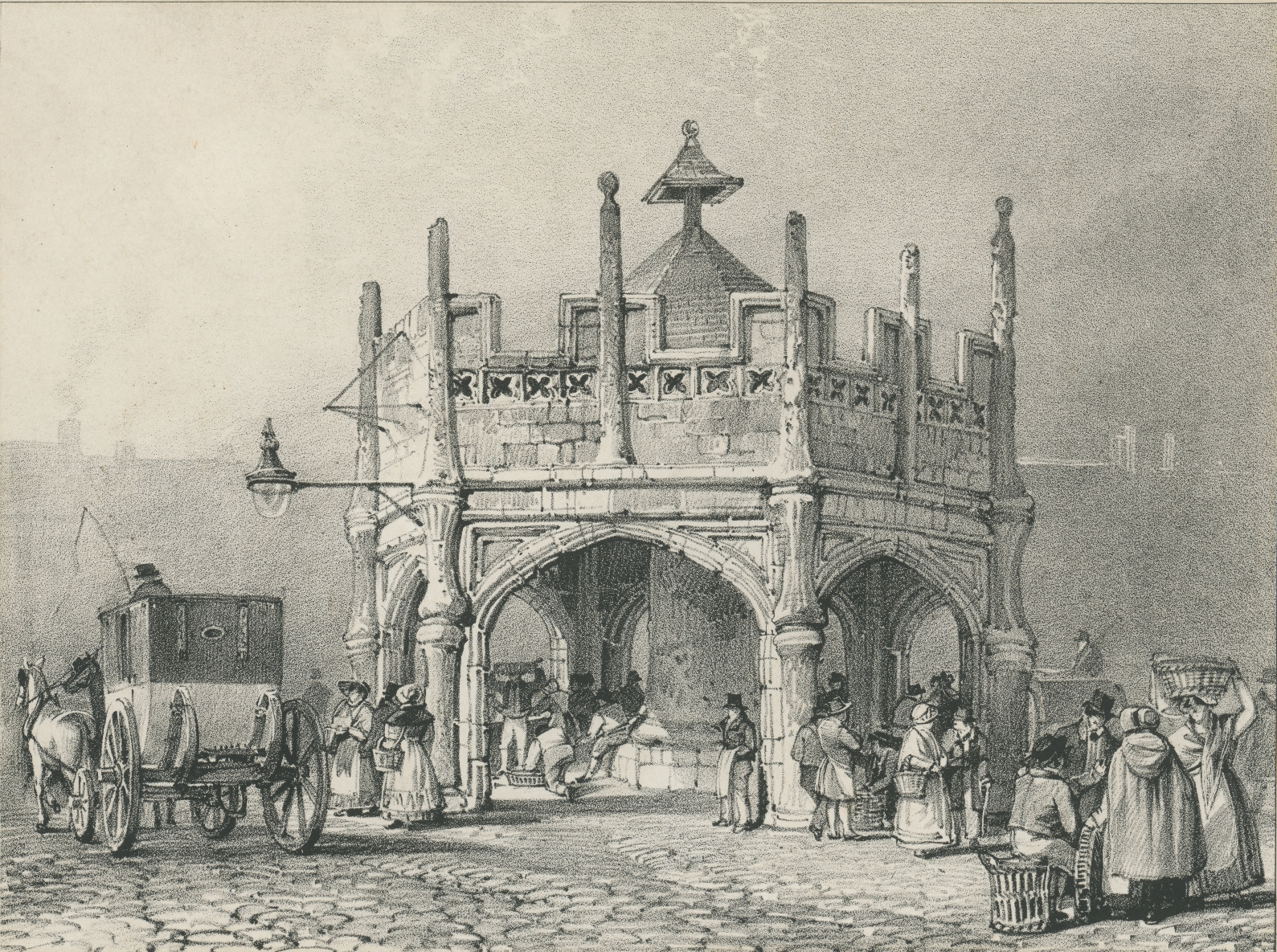

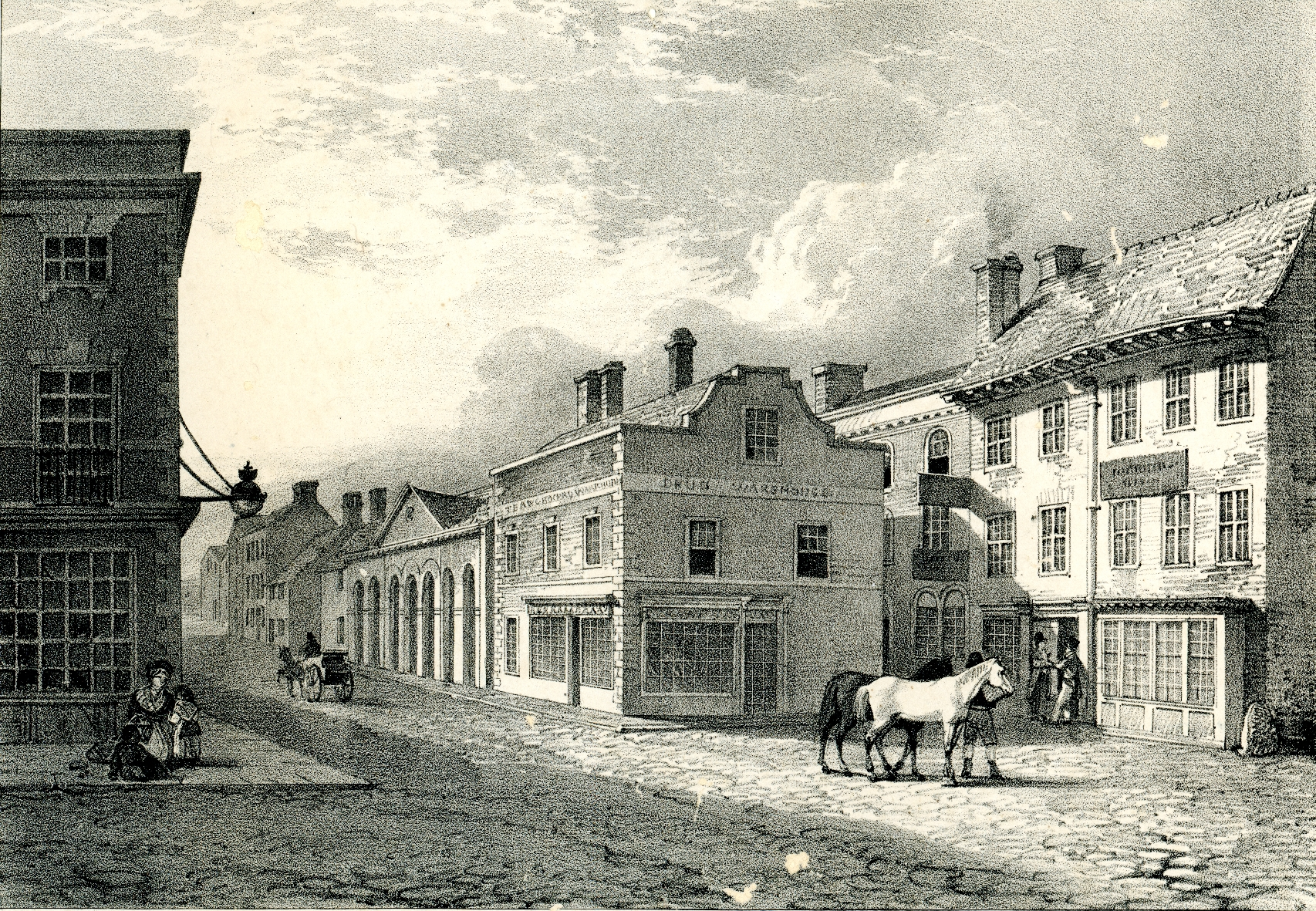

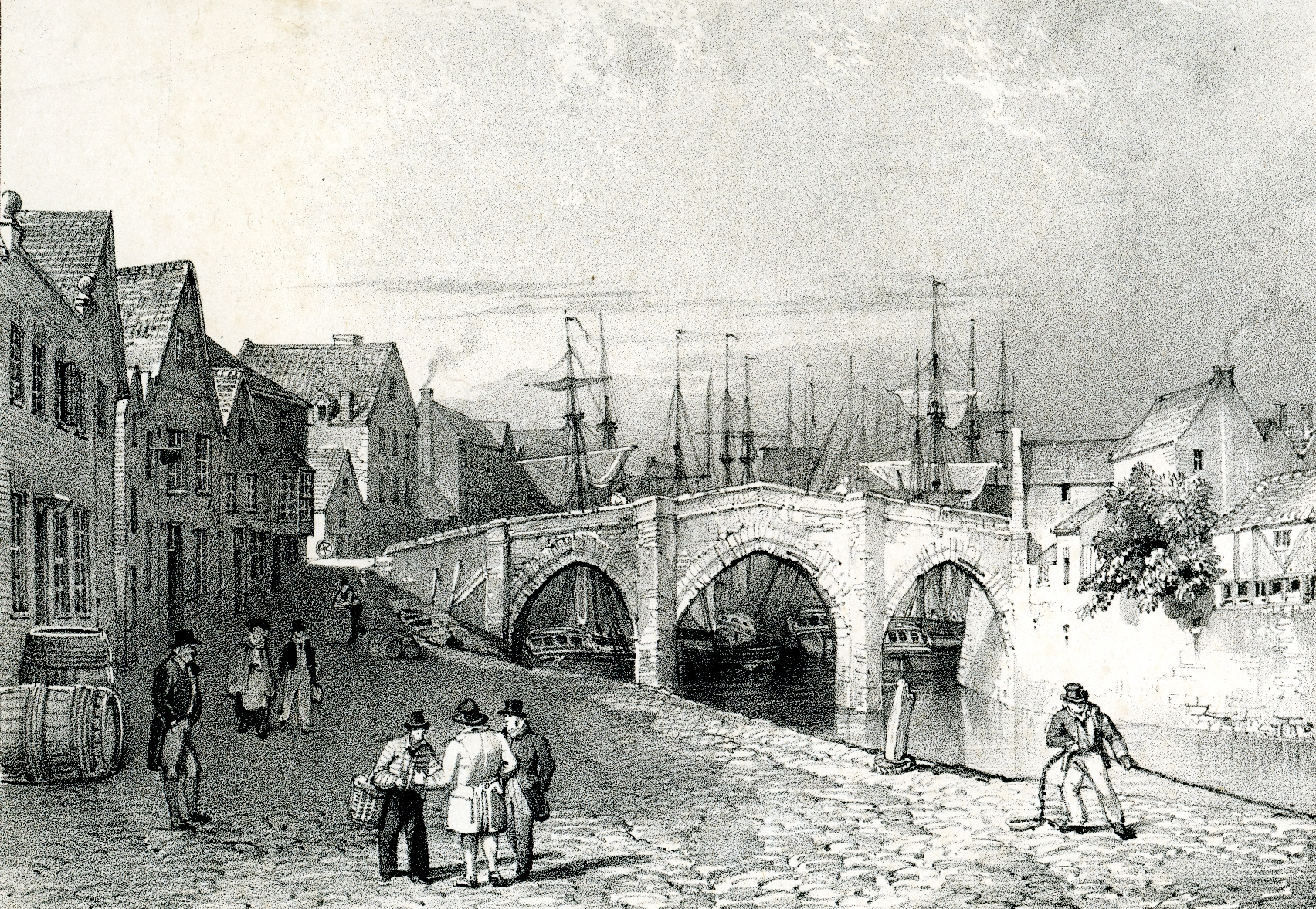

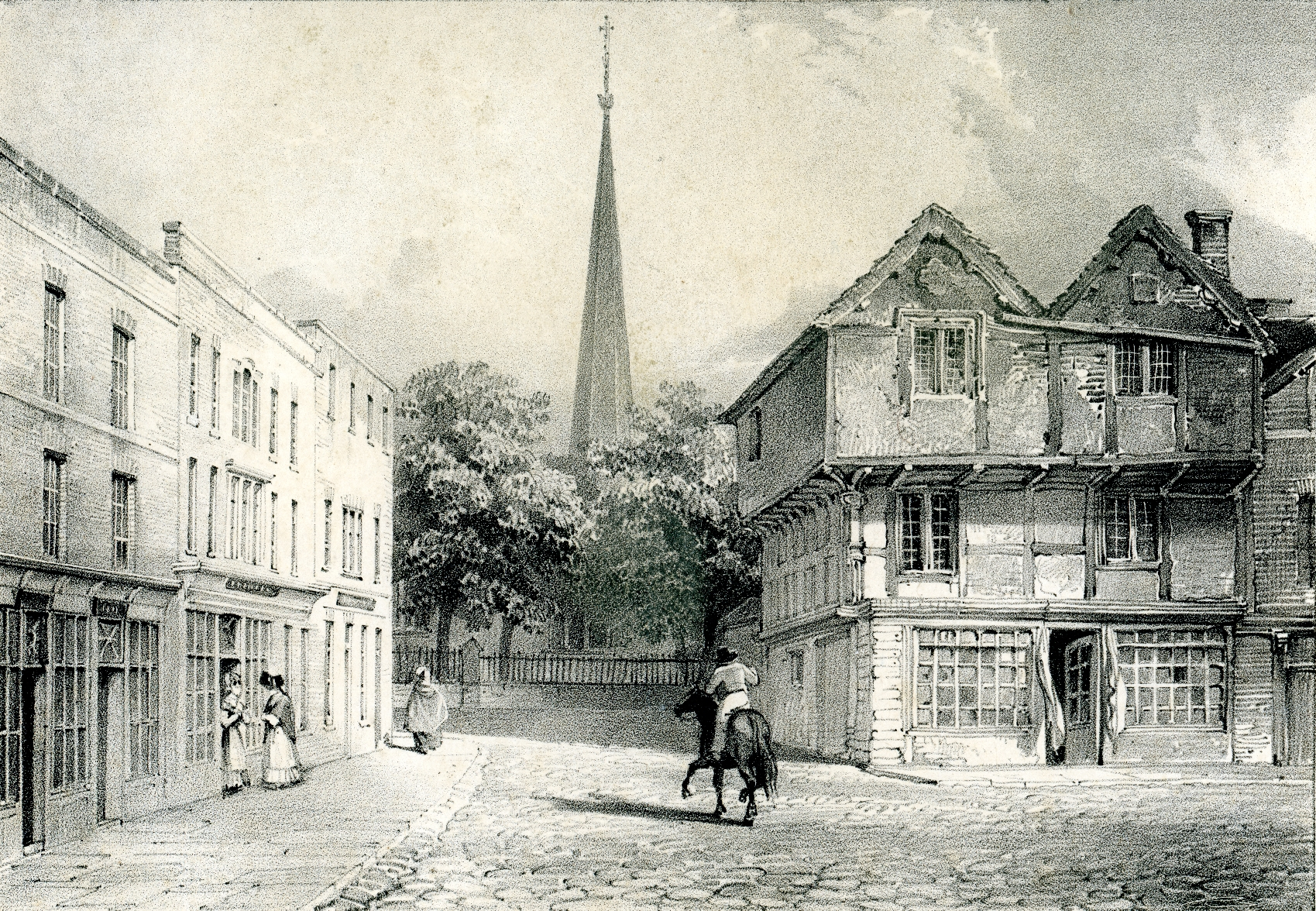

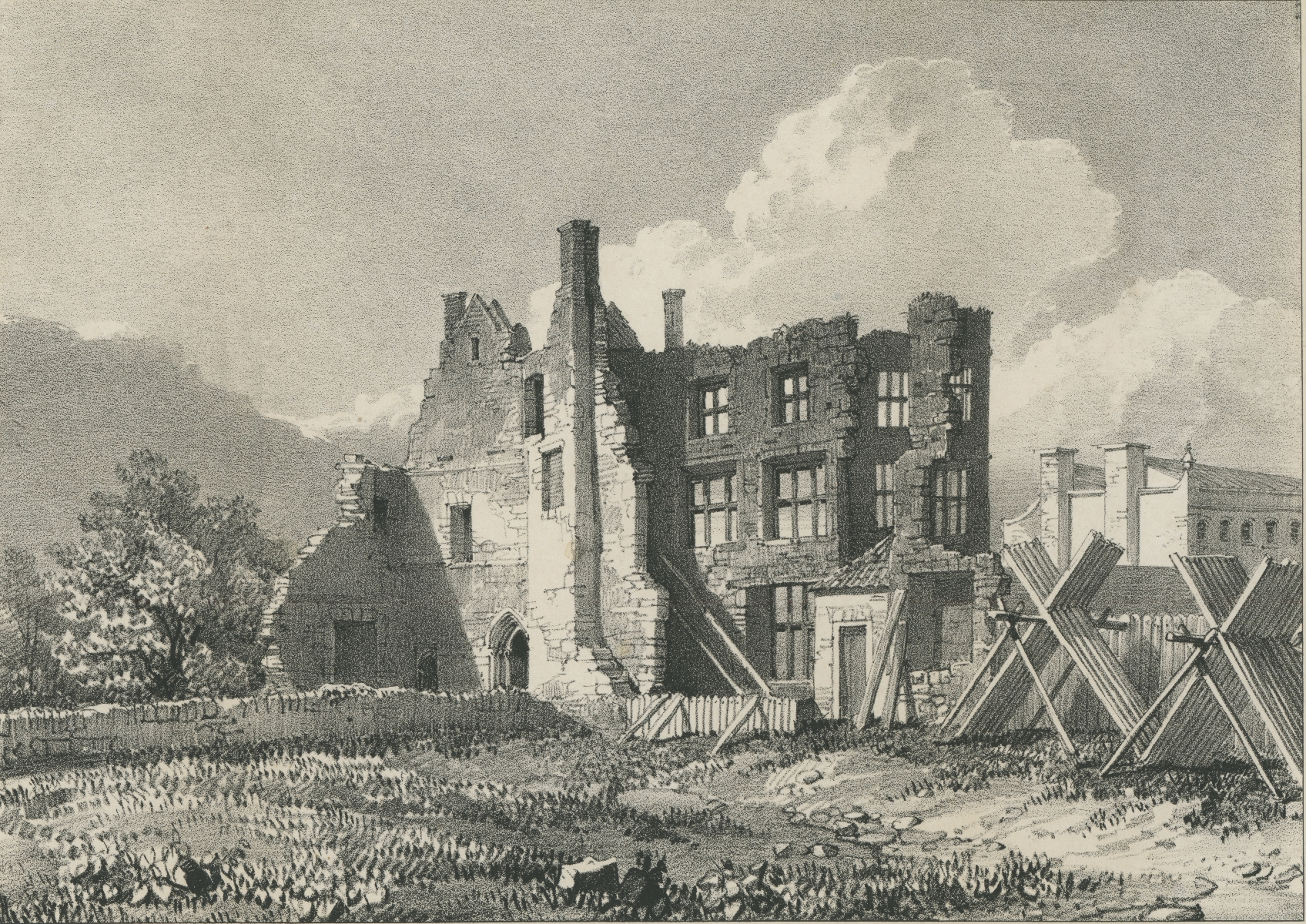

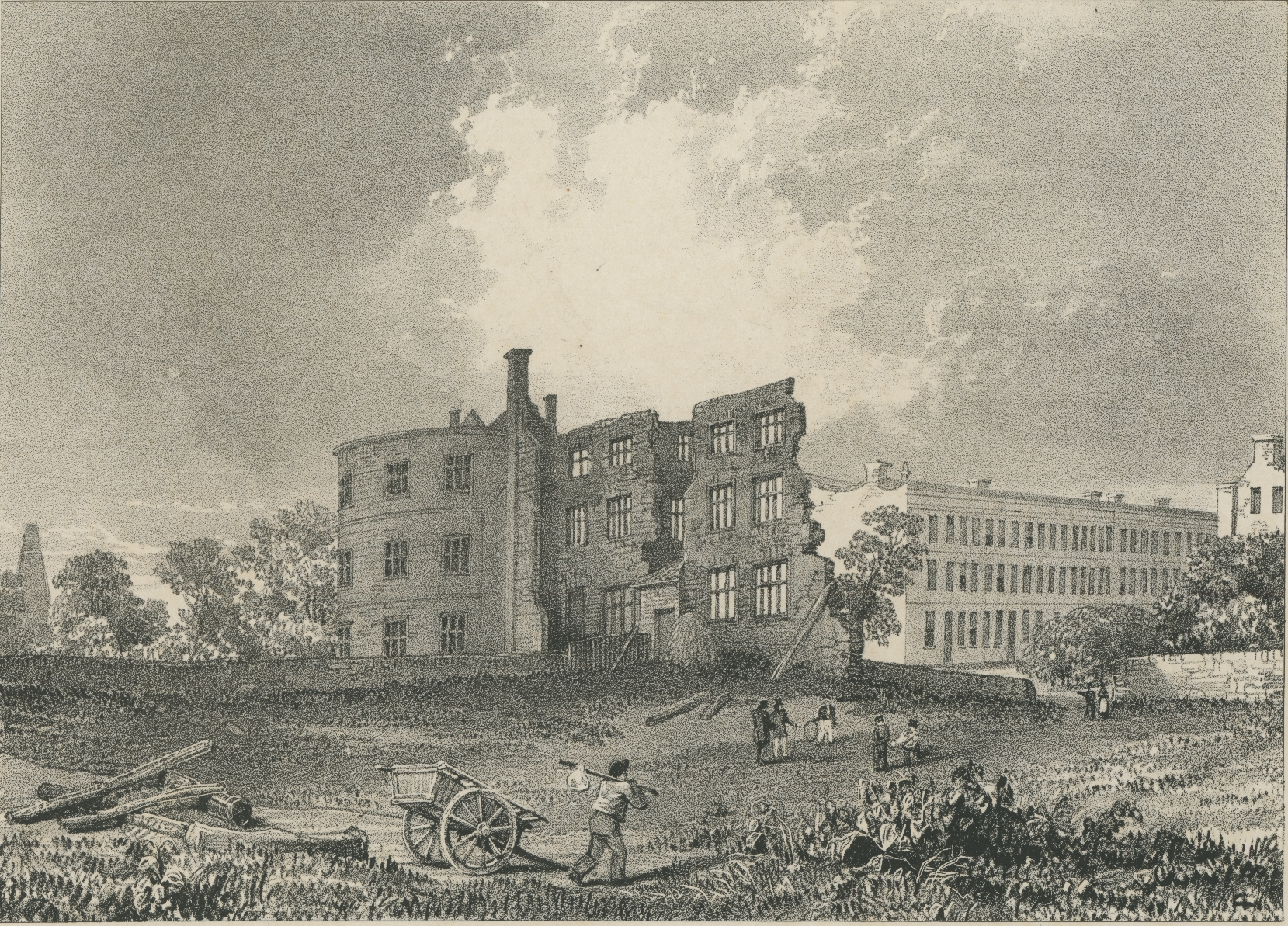

== Sources ==
- Dilks, T Bruce, Charles James Fox and the Borough of Bridgwater (Bridgwater: East Gate Press, 1937). Contains transcripts of 20 of Fox's letters to John Chubb, and reproductions of some of the drawings.
- Chubb, Mary, ‘A Forebear and his Hobby’ in The Countryman, Vol. 61 Winter 1963/64, p 276. and Chubb, Mary, ‘A Forebear and his Hobby -2’ in The Countryman, Vol. 62 Spring 1964, p 89.
- Lawrence, Berta, 'John Chubb, a friend of Coleridge', in Charles Lamb Bulletin NS, Vol. 27, July 1979, pp 51–55.
- Lawrence, Berta, 'John Chubb' in Somerset & West, Vol.7, No 3, March 1983, pp 24–27.
- Girouard, Mark, ‘Country-Town Portfolio’ in Country Life, Dec. 7 1989, pp 154–159.
- Smedley, Brian, Bridgwater and the Abolition of the Slave Trade, 2018, [A Blake Museum, Bridgwater, information leaflet]
