= Gussie White =

American activist (1889–1953)

- Born: January 30, 1889; Alabama, USA
- Died: January 23, 1953 (aged 63); Chatham County, Georgia, USA
- Burial place: Laurel Grove Cemetery
- Occupations: Archaeologist; civil rights activist
- Employer: Works Progress Administration
- Spouse: Bonaparte White
- Children: John White (first Black police officer in Georgia)

Gussie White (30 January 1889 – 23 January 1953) was an American archaeologist, civil rights activist, and Works Progress Administration employee, who in that role was one of the few named Black women (of at least 87 total) involved in the excavation of the Irene Mound (a significant site of Georgia prehistory). Her son, John White, was the first Black police officer in Georgia.

== Life ==
Gussie White was born in Alabama in 1889. She attended the Tuskegee Normal School for Women, and trained as an educator and clerical worker. After her husband was disabled in a workplace accident, she found work at the Irene Mound project. This project was initiated in 1937, under the Works Progress Administration. The site lay five miles northwest of downtown Savannah, and the project - undertaken between 1937 and 1940 - led to its becoming the most completely excavated mound site in Georgia.

Despite the manual labour undertaken, the women were not provided with overalls, and White's son later recalled that she wore "her own "brogans", gloves, and an old cotton dress" to work at the Mound. The Irene Mound project was led by a series of trained archaeologists, but records also state "the high quality of the excavations by a workforce of all African American women," of which White was one of the few named. A report of the work written by Joseph Caldwell and Catherine McCann, published in 1941, noted in its preface that:

Most credit is due... to the continuous efforts of the personnel of the project, both in the field and in the laboratory. The actual digging was done by Negro women, and their work was eminently satisfactory.

Scholars such as Cheryl Claassen have noted that the employment of African American women in physical archaeological work by the WPA rested "on a racist definition of womanhood and femininity", and left a mixed legacy of "benevolence and malevolence".

White's son, John White, became one of Savannah's "Original Nine" - the city's first Black police officers - in 1947. John White credited his mother with encouraging him to apply, telling a reporter that: "60 of us applied. My mother was really active in the political arena, and she put my name in, along with several other young men."

Gussie White died on 23 January 1953, and was buried at Laurel Grove Cemetery in Savannah, Georgia.

== Legacy ==
In a 2022 article exploring how the "development of early archaeological method and thought was deeply affected by White supremacy", anthropologist Matthew C. Reilly asked:

What alternative histories of the field might we present to our students and the public if instead of Montroville Dickeson and Flinders Petrie, we prioritize the lives of Gussie White and the other Black and White women who excavated at Irene Mound in Georgia... or the labourers who unearthed countless sites throughout North Africa and the Middle East?

Project such as TrowelBlazers have also highlighted Gussie White, and other women in the history of archaeology, geology, and palaeontology, as deserving of more recognition and further study.
