= Open Quaternary =

- Discipline: Quaternary science
- Language: English
- Edited by: Victoria Herridge, Matthew Law, Hanneke Meijer, and Suzanne Pilaar Birch

Publication details
- History: 2015–present
- Publisher: Ubiquity Press (United Kingdom)
- Frequency: continuous
- Open access: Yes
- License: Creative Commons Attribution License

Standard abbreviations
- ISO 4: Open Quat.

Indexing
- ISSN: 2055-298X

Links
- Journal homepage

Open Quaternary is a peer-reviewed open access scientific journal publishing contributions that consider the changing environment of the Quaternary, and the development of humanity. It published with Ubiquity Press. It has four editors in chief: Victoria Herridge, Matthew Law, Hanneke Meijer, and Suzanne Pilaar Birch.

== Abstracting and indexing ==
The journal is abstracted and indexed in:

- Biological Abstracts
- BIOSIS Previews
- Zoological Record
- Scopus
- DOAJ
