= Brenna Hassett =

American British bioarchaeologist

- Born: California, USA
- Education: University of California, Los Angeles; University College London
- Occupations: Researcher and author
- Employer: University College London

Brenna R. Hassett is an American British bioarchaeologist at University College London (UCL), author, public speaker and one of the founders of TrowelBlazers, which celebrates women archaeologists, paleontologists and geologists.

== Early life and education ==
Hassett was born in California, USA and attended Corona Del Mar High School in Newport Beach, California.

She holds a BA in anthropology from the University of California, Los Angeles and an MA in archaeology from University College London in the United Kingdom. She was awarded a PhD in dental anthropology from UCL in 2011, supported by a Wenner Gren Foundation Research Scholarship.

== Research career ==
Hassett has undertaken substantial archaeological fieldwork, including in Greece, Thailand and Turkey. The majority of her fieldwork has concerned analysis and recording of human remains for Aşıklı Höyük (Istanbul University), the Çatalhöyük Project (Stanford/UCL), Giza Plateau Mapping Project (Oriental Institute Chicago/American Research Center in Egypt), AOC Archaeology Unit (London), and the British Museum (London).

Hassett was a post-doctoral researcher at the Natural History Museum in London from 2012 to 2016, working on the "Tooth fairy" project, researching what forensic analysis of teeth can tell us about the diet and lifestyles of children in the past. Hassett remains a scientific associate of the Natural History Museum.

Since 2018, she has been co-leading the large four year research project "Radical Death", funded by the Arts and Humanities Research Council, at University College London. Using new evidence from the Early Bronze Age graves of Başur Höyük, on the Upper Tigris in Turkey, the project is researching how ritual killing was implicated in the political transformations of the third millennium BC. In 2019, Hassett was awarded a British Institute at Ankara (BIAA) study grant to extend the impact of the Radical Death project to include conservation and finds training for graduate students and undergraduates at Ege University.

== Writing career ==
In 2017, her first book Built on Bones 15,000 Years of Urban Life and Death was published by Bloomsbury Sigma press to critical acclaim. She wrote her second book, called Growing Up Human: the evolution of childhood, published by Bloomsbury Sigma in 2022.

Hassett has a regular column "Dirty Science" on the Cosmic Shambles Blog Network which was created in 2017 by Robin Ince and Trent Burton. She also writes for The Guardian and History Today.

== Public engagement, media and outreach ==
Hassett is a regular invited speaker at public events such as the Cheltenham Science Festival, New Scientist Live, the London Feminist Conference, Skeptics in the Pub, the Cambridge Science Festival and Nature Live amongst others. She has also appeared on the BBC, PBS, the Guardian Science Podcast, Nine Lessons Live, and was a speaker in the 2017 March for Science in London.

She is a founding member of the TrowelBlazers collective, which seeks to promote awareness of female participation in science, particularly contributions to archaeology, palaeontology, and geology. This project has included a public-participatory online archive, as well as much wider engagement with social media communities and public talks, panel discussions, and lectures aimed at diverse audiences. In 2015, TrowelBlazers worked with the toy company Arklu to develop the Fossil Hunter Lottie Doll, which is now sold all over the world. In 2016, TrowelBlazes developed and launched the Raising Horizons project, which was a collaboration highlighting the contributions of women geoscientists past and present with artist Leonora Saunders and toured the UK throughout 2017-19.
