= Stephen L. Brusatte =

American paleontologist (born 1984)

Stephen L. Brusatte FRSE
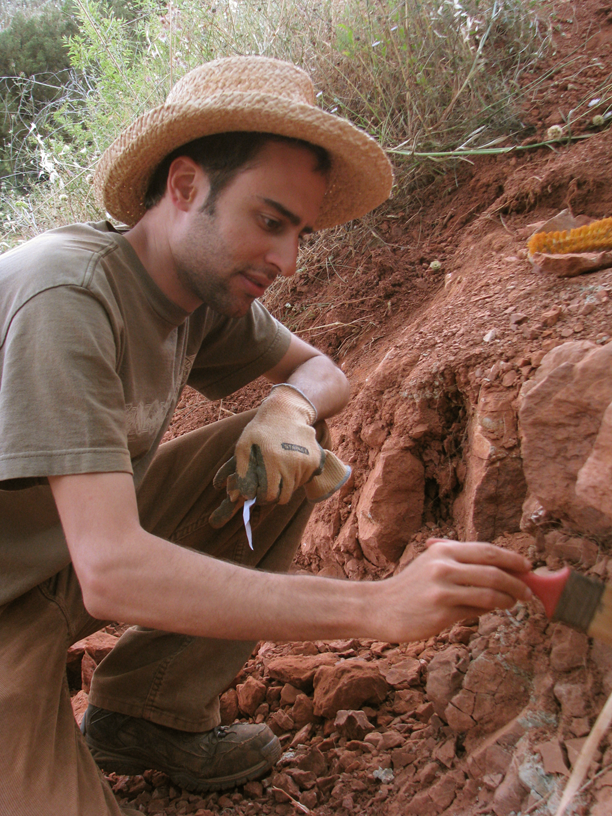
- Brusatte at a Portuguese fossil site, 2014
- Born: April 24, 1984 (age 42); Ottawa, Illinois, US
- Other name: Steve Brusatte
- Education: University of Chicago (B.S.); University of Bristol (MSc); Columbia University (MPhil & PhD)
- Known for: Evolution of dinosaurs
- Scientific career
- Fields: Paleontology
- Workplaces: University of Edinburgh
- Doctoral advisor: Mark Norell
- Other academic advisors: Paul Sereno; Michael J. Benton
- Author abbrev. (zoology): Brusatte

Stephen Louis Brusatte FRSE (born April 24, 1984) is an American evolutionary biologist and science popularizer who specializes in the anatomy and evolution of dinosaurs. He was educated at the University of Chicago for his Bachelor's degree, at the University of Bristol for his Master's of Science on a Marshall Scholarship, and finally at the Columbia University for Master's in Philosophy and Doctorate. He is currently Professor of Palaeontology and Evolution at the University of Edinburgh. In April 2024, Brusatte was elected to fellowship of the Royal Society of Edinburgh.

In addition to his scientific papers and technical monographs, his book Dinosaurs (2008) and the textbook Dinosaur Paleobiology (2012) earned him accolades. He was the resident palaeontologist and scientific consultant for the BBC Earth and 20th Century Fox's 2013 film Walking With Dinosaurs, which was followed by his book Walking with Dinosaurs Encyclopedia. His book The Rise and Fall of the Dinosaurs: A New History of a Lost World (2018), written for the adult lay person, was a New York Times bestseller. In June 2022, he published The Rise and Reign of the Mammals: A New History, from the Shadow of the Dinosaurs to Us. Brusatte has also published several children's books on dinosaurs in collaboration with his wife since 2022. In 2026, he published The Story of Birds: An Evolutionary History of the Dinosaurs That Live Among Us, an account of the evolutionary history of birds from their dinosaur origins to the present.

== Biography ==
Brusatte was born in Ottawa, Illinois to Jim and Roxanne Brusatte. He was educated at the Ottawa Township High School.

From 2002, he attended the University of Chicago from where he earned his Bachelor's in geophysical sciences in 2006. He studied under Paul Sereno. He was elected a Student Marshal, the highest academic honor the university bestows to undergraduates. He was also the winner of the John Crerar Foundation Science Writing Prize and the Howard Hughes Institute Undergraduate Research Fellowship. In 2006, he was awarded a Marshall Scholarship to study in the United Kingdom. He entered the University of Bristol and obtained a Master's in Science in palaeobiology and earth sciences in 2008. His master's thesis was titled Basal Archosaur Phylogeny and Evolution, and was supervised by Michael J. Benton. He returned to the US to join Columbia University, from where he completed his Master's in Philosophy in 2011 and Doctorate in 2013 from the Department of Earth and Environmental Sciences. During this period, he concurrently worked as a researcher at the Division of Paleontology of the American Museum of Natural History. He became a Chancellor's Fellow in Vertebrate Palaeontology at the School of GeoSciences in the University of Edinburgh in February 2013.

He is a member of the Editorial Board for Current Biology.

== Contributions ==
Brusatte is the author of the 2002 book Stately Fossils: A Comprehensive Look at the State Fossils and Other Official Fossils and the 2008 book Dinosaurs. Additionally, he authored several scientific papers as well as over 100 popular articles for magazines such as Fossil News, Dino Press, Dinosaur World, and Prehistoric Times. At Chicago, he aided in the creation of two databases, TaxonSearch and CharacterSearch, that organize taxonomic and phylogenetic information.

=== Discovery of fossils ===
Brusatte has discovered more than a dozen new species of vertebrate fossils. His breakthrough in the study of dinosaur fossils was while at the University of Chicago with Paul Sereno. Having discovered the skull, jaw, and neck fossils of a 95-million-year-old theropod in the Elrhaz Formation of Niger in 1997, Sereno was looking for a competent student to analyse it. Brusatte took the opportunity in 2004, completed the project in 2005, and published his findings in 2007 with Sereno. The animal was found to be a new species of Carcharodontosaurus, which they named C. iguidensis. He estimated that the complete skull would be more than five feet long, one of the biggest skulls of a known carnivorous dinosaur. This was followed by the description of another new theropod from the Elrhaz Formation in January 2008, Kryptops palaios. Another significant discovery was from China in 2014. Alongside Chinese paleontologist Lü Junchang and others, Brusatte described a 66-million-year-old dinosaur, Qianzhousaurus sinensis, which was closely related to the T. rex. Due to its long snout, it was given the nickname "Pinocchio rex".

In January 2015, his team announced the discovery of a marine reptile belonging to the Jurassic Period, around 170 million years ago. The giant, long-nosed, fish-like animal, named Dearcmhara shawcrossi, was found on the Isle of Skye in Scotland. He warrants that the species is not ancestral to Nessie, the Scottish legendary marine animal, as popular media liked to hype, but is certainly the first "distinctly Scottish prehistoric marine reptile".

Below is a list of taxa that Brusatte has contributed to naming:

| Year | Taxon | Authors |
|---|---|---|
| 2026 | Ferenceratops shqiperorum gen. nov. | Maidment, Butler, Brusatte, Meade, Augustin, Csiki-Sava & Ősi |
| 2024 | Enalioetes schroederi gen. et sp. nov. | Sachs, Young, Hornung, Cowgill, Schwab & Brusatte |
| 2023 | Micrauchenia saladensis gen. et sp. nov. | Püschel, Alarcón-Muñoz, Soto-Acuña, Ugalde, Shelley & Brusatte |
| 2022 | Dearc sgiathanach gen. et sp. nov. | Jagielska, O'Sullivan, Funston, Butler, Challands, Clark, Fraser, Penny, Ross, Wilkinson & Brusatte |
| 2021 | Tamarro insperatus gen. et sp. nov. | Sellés, Villa, Brusatte, Currie & Galobart |
| 2019 | Suskityrannus hazelae gen. et sp. nov. | Nesbitt, Denton, Loewen, Brusatte, Smith, Turner, Kirkland, McDonald, & Wolfe |
| 2016 | Tongtianlong limosus gen. et sp. nov. | Lü, Chen, Brusatte, Zhu & Shen |
| 2016 | Timurlengia euotica gen. et sp. nov. | Brusatte, Averianov, Sues, Muir & Butler |
| 2015 | Zhenyuanlong suni gen. et sp. nov. | Lü & Brusatte |
| 2015 | Metoposaurus algarvensis sp. nov. | Brusatte, Butler, Mateus & Steyer |
| 2015 | Dearcmhara shawcrossi gen. et sp. nov. | Brusatte, Young, Challands, Clark, Fischer, Fraser, Liston, MacFadyen, Ross, Walsh & Wilkinson |
| 2014 | Qianzhousaurus sinensis gen. et sp. nov. | Lü, Yi, Brusatte, Yang, Li & Chen |
| 2013 | Tyrannoneustes lythrodectikos gen. et sp. nov. | Young, De Andrade, Brusatte, Sakamoto & Liston |
| 2013 | Juratyrant langhami gen. nov. | Brusatte & Benson |
| 2010 | Balaur bondoc gen. et sp. nov. | Csiki, Vremir, Brusatte & Norell |
| 2009 | Alioramus altai sp. nov. | Brusatte, Carr, Erickson, Bever & Norell |
| 2009 | Raptorex kriegsteini gen. et sp. nov. | Sereno, Tan, Brusatte, Kriegstein, Zhao & Cloward |
| 2009 | Shaochilong maortuensis gen. nov. | Brusatte, Benson, Chure, Xu, Sullivan & Hone |
| 2008 | Eocarcharia dinops gen. et sp. nov. | Sereno & Brusatte |
| 2008 | Kryptops palaios gen. et sp. nov. | Sereno & Brusatte |
| 2007 | Carcharodontosaurus iguidensis sp. nov. | Brusatte & Sereno |

=== Documentary appearances ===
Stephen Brusatte took part in several documentaries. In 2015, he appeared in T. Rex Autopsy, a documentary produced by National Geographic Channel and aired on June 7, 2015. In 2016, he appeared in T-Rex: An Evolutionary Journey, produced by NHK.

=== Films ===
In February 2020, Brusatte was hired as a member of the consulting team of paleontologists to work on Jurassic World Dominion. The film included many feathered dinosaurs for the first time in a Jurassic Park movie. Brusatte reported that he had been extensively involved with the production team and that he made director Colin Trevorrow promise to include feathered dinosaurs in this installment of the franchise. Brusatte returned as a consultant on Jurassic World Rebirth.

== Works ==
- Stately Fossils: A Comprehensive Look at the State Fossils and Other Official Fossils (2002)
- Dinosaurs (2008)
- Field Guide to Dinosaurs (2009)
- Dinosaur Paleobiology (2012)
- Were Stegosaurs Carnivores? (2012)
- Walking with Dinosaurs Encyclopedia (Walking With Dinosaurs the 3d Movie) (2013)
- Day of the Dinosaurs: Step into a spectacular prehistoric world (Science X 10) (2016)
- Pinocchio Rex and Other Tyrannosaurs (2017)
- The Rise and Fall of the Dinosaurs: A New History of a Lost World (2018)
- The Rise and Reign of the Mammals: A New History, from the Shadow of the Dinosaurs to Us (2022)
- Dugie The Dinosaur: Scotland's Sauropod (with Anne Brusatte) (2022)
- My Grandparents were Dinosaurs (with Anne Brusatte, illustrated by Enrico Lorenzi) (2025)
- The Story of Birds: An Evolutionary History of the Dinosaurs That Live Among Us (2026)
