= John Burland Chubb =

Amateur artist (1861–1955)

John Burland Chubb (1861-1955) was a great-grandson of the Bridgwater artist John Chubb. He was a member of a talented family; his uncles included John Chubb, (1813-1859), an attorney and solicitor, of Cirencester, who married Caroline Tudway, in 1838 and died in 1859. He was also a talented amateur artist who made a series of lithographs based on his grandfather's topographical paintings of Bridgwater. Thomas Alford Chubb (1815-1883), the second son, served as secretary, and later treasurer, to the South Eastern Railway Company. The third son, Harry, (1816-1888) was prominent in the management of a number of coal-gas companies and railways in London, and was a member of the Institution of Civil Engineers. He died in 1888. The sixth son, Arthur, was a BA of Pembroke College, Cambridge. He died at the house of his brother, John, in 1852 at the age of 29. Of the other sons, Hammond Chubb (1829-1904) served as the secretary to the Bank of England for 30 years, having joined in 1847; he died in 1904 at the age of 75.

His brother, Thomas Lyon Chubb (1858-1936) was trained as a mechanical engineer and later worked in the engineering management of the Buenos Aires Western Railway in the Argentine.

His father, Thomas Alford Chubb, noted that at the age of 6 he was drawing churches, and at 12 it was building interiors and railway stations.

He was educated at Merchant Taylors' School, Northwood between 1869 and 1877 and was Resident Surveyor to the Foundling Hospital. He was elected F.R.I.B.A. in 1904.

Upon the hospital's relocation out of London, he retired and, from 1926, he lived at Froyle, East Hampshire. In his retirement, he served on the Alton RDC and the Froyle Parish Council.

He was married to Bertha Nield and their children were: Ethel, who married the Egyptologist Stephen Glanville, John, Philip, Richard and the Mary Chubb, who wrote about her ancestor's art.

He was buried at Froyle, with his wife, Richard and Mary.

He made contact about his ancestor's art and manuscripts with the Revd Dr H.D. Powell of Bridgwater. After the formation of Blake Museum in 1926 he gave a collection of his ancestor's topographical paintings of Bridgwater and neighbourhood. He collaborated in the publication of John Chubb's correspondence with the politician Charles James Fox.

The family of the John Chubb purchased a Jacobean era Four-poster bed, from Bridgwater Castle, reputed to have been slept in by James Scott, 1st Duke of Monmouth at the time of the Battle of Sedgemoor. It was sold in 1972 to Agecroft Hall.
