= Victoria Herridge =

British palaeontologist

Victoria Louise "Tori" Herridge, (born 1980), is a British palaeontologist who currently serves as a Senior Lecturer at the University of Sheffield and one of the founders of TrowelBlazers. She is a founding editor-in-chief at the open access journal Open Quaternary. She has written about evolution of island mammals, the ethics of cloning mammoths, and the importance of studying the history of women in science.

== Career ==
Herridge graduated with a first class degree in biology from University College London in 2002. After a master's degree at Imperial College London, she returned to University College London to gain a doctorate with a thesis titled "Dwarf Elephants on Mediterranean Islands: A Natural Experiment in Parallel Evolution". Her research addressed evolution of island mammals during the Pleistocene period and their responses to extreme climate change. She is a founding editor-in-chief at the open access journal Open Quaternary.

== Science communication ==
Herridge delivered the 2012 Charles Lyell Award lecture at the British Science Festival and co-wrote Who Do You Think You Really Are? for the Natural History Museum. The film was a Premier Award Winner in 2011. As well as her academic output she is a popular science writer: her work includes a piece on the ethics of cloning mammoths versus the importance of saving endangered elephants, and one on the importance of studying the history of women in science (with Brenna Hassett, Suzanne Pilaar Birch and Becky Wragg Sykes), both published in The Guardian.

In November 2014 Herridge co-presented the Channel 4 documentary about the autopsy of the Maly Lyakhovsky Mammoth (aka "Buttercup"). She presented the 2016 Channel 4 series Walking Through Time and co-presented three series of Britain at Low Tide (2016, 2018 and 2019; series 1 with archaeologist Alex Langlands).

In January 2020 she presented Bone Detectives: Britain's Buried Secrets on Channel 4. She was a guest on the BBC Radio 4 programme The Life Scientific in February 2025.

In January 2026, she appeared on BBCs Digging for Britain as a co-presenter for the 13th series. On 5 June 2026, the BBC announced that Herridge will be the main presenter of Digging for Britain, following Alice Robert's decision to leave at the end of series 13.
