= Irene Mound site =

Historical site in Georgia

Irene Mound
- Cultures: Mississippian culture
- Location: Near Savannah, Georgia

History
- Built: 1,150–1,300 AD

The Irene Mound is a historical site in Georgia associated with the Mississippian culture.

== Description ==
The Irene Mound site was located on the western bluff of the Savannah River. Its location is about 5 miles from Savannah city center. Pipemakers Creek ran along one side and a ditch enclosed the other. It previously consisted of a collection of temple mounds and residences, a burial mound and a rotunda. It was about 2.4 hectares in size, and is the largest Mississippian site on the Georgia coast.

== History ==
The site went through seven phases of construction while it was occupied, between 1,150 AD and 1,300 AD. It is believed to have housed the local chief and his family, no more than 30 or 40 people total. Different types of ware, including cordmarked, stamped and burnished ware. Food waste like shell middens were also found there.

== Excavations ==
The Works Progress Administration, Chatham County commissioners and Savannah chamber of commerce organized an archaeological project which excavated the Irene Mound site between 1937 and 1940. Many women, especially black women, took part in the excavations of the Irene Mound site in the 1930s. Gussie White is one of the most prominent examples of these women archaeologists.
