= The Rise and Reign of the Mammals =

2022 paleontology book by Steve Brusatte

- Author: Steve Brusatte
- Illustrator: Todd Marshall, Sarah Shelley
- Subject: Evolution of mammals
- Publisher: Mariner Books
- Publication date: 2022

The Rise and Reign of the Mammals: A New History, from the Shadow of the Dinosaurs to Us is a 2022 book on the evolution of mammals by paleontologist Steve Brusatte. The book received positive reviews, with reviewers praising his storytelling.

== Background ==
The author, Steve Brusatte, is a paleontologist at the University of Edinburgh. His first popular science book for adults, The Rise and Fall of the Dinosaurs, was published in 2018. He began his career as a dinosaur paleontologist, but since then, he had shifted his research focus to mammals, wondering "what happened next" after the dinosaurs.

The Rise and Reign of the Mammals was published June 7th, 2022 by Mariner Books, an imprint of HarperCollins. Illustrations were provided by Todd Marshall and Brusatte's former PhD student Sarah Shelley.

== Contents ==
Beginning with the split between the ancestors of mammals and reptiles in the Carboniferous period, the books traces the evolution of mammals chronologically to the present day. It begins with the last common ancestor of mammals and reptiles and covers the evolution of mammals within a physically smaller niche compared to the larger dinosaurs. He then covers how mammal lineage survived the asteroid impact that wiped out non-avian dinosaurs, and their evolution into the larger niches previously occupied by dinosaurs. This eventually brings us to the modern day and the evolution of humans, though where the book touches on the human lineage, it focuses primarily on non-human primates, and Homo sapiens is given "about the same attention as horses and whales and elephants." Brusatte concludes the book with a discussion on the potential for human or mammalian extinction, comparing the potential end of mammalian dominance to the extinction of the dinosaurs that allowed mammals to flourish.

As in The Rise and Fall of the Dinosaurs, Brusatte intersperses descriptions of modern and historical paleontological work and his own experience with studying mammals with descriptions of mammalian evolution.

== Reception ==
Reviewers praise Brusatte's storytelling and big-picture overview of mammalian evolution. Julia Clarke, a paleontologist at the University of Texas in Austin, praises the book for including a diverse array of female palentologists, in contrast to The Rise and Fall of the Dinosaurs. She criticizes the book for an instance of misleading phrasing, but overall calls it a "compelling and energetic guide" to mammals.
