= Margarete Gütschow =

German classical archaeologist

Margarete Gütschow (1871–1951) was a German classical archaeologist. She was one of the first women to work professionally as an architect, collaborating with the German Archaeological Institute in Rome from 1910. In 1918, she began studying classical architecture at the University of Berlin but did not complete her doctorate. Instead, in 1925 she returned to Rome, assisting Gerhart Rodenwaldt (1886–1945) in investigating funerary sculpture, a topic which became the focus of her subsequent work. In 1928, Margarete Gütschow was appointed a corresponding member of the German Archaeological Institute, becoming an ordinary member in 1935, although she continued to work largely in an assistant role despite recognition from senior scholars.

== Publications ==
- Ein Kindersarkophag mit Darstellung aus der Argonautensage, 1928
- Sarkophag-Studien, I., 1931
- Das Prätextatmuseum in Rom und seine Bedeutung für die Kunst der Spätantike, 1937
- Das Museum der Prätextat-Katakombe, 1938
