= James Colwell =

- Born: 1860; Gloucester, England
- Died: 1930 (aged 69–70); Rose Bay, New South Wales
- Education: Westminster Training College
- Spouse: Grace née Kelynack
- Children: 2
- Parent: Richard Colwell
- Church: Methodist
- Ordained: 1885
- Congregations served: Rose Bay

James Colwell (1860 – 1930) was an English-born Australian Methodist minister and historian.

== Early life and education ==
Colwell was born in Gloucester, England, the seventh son of Richard Colwell. He was trained as a teacher at the Wesley Day School in Gloucester and the Westminster Training College before migrating to Sydney in 1884.

== Career ==
On his arrival in Sydney, he became an assistant master at Newington College. A year later he entered the Methodist ministry of New South Wales. He married Grace Kelynack, the daughter of William Kelynack. After forty years of service, he retired as supernumerary minister to Rose Bay in 1925. He was a member of the college council at Newington College and at Annesley in Bowral.

As an historian he was the author of The History of Methodism in New South Wales, A Century in the Pacific and edited and was part author of The Story of Australia. Colwell was a frequent contributor to The Sydney Morning Herald.

In 1914 he was made a Fellow of the Royal Historical Society in England and in 1923 a Fellow of the Royal Geographical Society in Australia. He was also a Fellow of the Royal Colonial Institute and a member of the Royal Australian Historical Society.

== Personal life ==
On his death he was survived by his wife, a son, Alan Colwell, and a daughter, Gordon Studdy. From 1928 until 1971, Alan Colwell presented the James Colwell Prize for Modern History in the Sixth Form at Newington College in honour of his father.
