= Lottie Dolls =

Toy line

- Type: Fashion doll, dolls, toys
- Invented by: Ian Harkinand Lucie Follett
- Country: Ireland
- Availability: 2012–present
- Official website

Lottie Dolls are a series of dolls created by Arklu Ltd. Launched in August 2012. Lottie promotes STEM subjects for kids and was even the first doll in space when she travelled to the International Space Station alongside British European Space Agency Astronaut, Tim Peake, on the Principia Mission, in December 2015.

== History ==
Arklu co-founders, Ian Harkin and Lucie Follett, based in London at the time, noticed a niche in the market, with parents concerned about the over-sexualization of dolls currently available in the market. They began 18-months of research, alongside British academics, resulting in Lottie; a doll based on the proportions of an average 9-year-old girl (with the exception of her head, which is larger to allow more hairstyling play). The research was gathered by leading British academics, Professor David McCarthy (Prof of Nutrition and Health - Institute for Health Research & Policy, London Metropolitan University) and Dr Margaret Ashwell OBE (formerly Science Director of the British Nutrition Foundation).

Arklu co-founder and Managing Director Ian Harkin decided to move from London to Letterkenny in County Donegal, close to Ian's hometown of Ballybofey in 2014. Having secured a grant from Enterprise Ireland's High Potential Start-Up Fund, Arklu were able to move and expand their business. Lucie Follett was Arklu's Creative Director with responsibility for all brand building, product development and product partnerships.

=== Google Adopt a Start-Up ===
Arklu was also named the winner of the "Google, girls award Adopt a Start-Up" programme in 2016. Eight finalists were chosen to present their company strategy to a panel of judges. Arklu was awarded €10,000 AdWords Credit, $20,000 Cloud Credit, and is now eligible for the Google Cloud Platform for Start-Up program. The "Adopt a Start-Up" Programme was created to assist companies in developing their business strategies and accelerate the growth of high-potential Start-Ups in Ireland.

== Products ==
Lottie and Finn are the main characters of the Arklu line. Lottie changes in appearance with different hair and skin tones. Finn was launched in 2014, and his clothes both fit Finn and Lottie, allowing boys and girls to interchange outfits. By 2017, the Lottie and Finn brands included a range of dolls with multiple skin tones, occupations, and abilities.

Several Lottie dolls are based on design submissions by children. In a 2015 competition, Arklu encouraged kids to design an outfit for Lottie. The winning design, Superhero Lottie, was produced based on the drawing by a 6-year old, Lily, from Ohio, and was independently judged by the Brave Girls Alliance.

=== European Space Agency & Stargazer Lottie ===
Stargazer Lottie was designed by 6-year old Abigail from Canada. She came up with the idea for an astronomy-based doll due to her interest, and her wanting other kids to learn more about space. She emailed Arklu, explaining her idea, and in collaboration with the European Space Agency, and help from Dr Karen Masters (female astronomer at Portsmouth University), Stargazer Lottie was created.

Stargazer Lottie was the first doll to ever make it into space – voyaging alongside British astronaut Tim Peake. Peake even tweeted about Lottie while in space. Lottie spent 264 days aboard the International Space Station during the Principia Mission.

=== TrowelBlazers & Fossil Hunter Lottie Partnership ===
Fossil Hunter Lottie was created in partnership with "TrowelBlazers". TrowelBlazers is a group of female archaeologists, geologists and palaeontologists, who aim to promote STEM pursuits, past and present.

=== Penguin Random House Partnership ===
Arklu signed a book deal with Penguin Random House (PRH), to last a three-year contract. The books are an extension of the Lottie, Finn and Friends collection – covering the adventures of the children over a range of topics including friendship, family and childhood.

=== WAGGGS & Brownie Lottie Partnership ===
Lottie Dolls signed a three-year deal with the World Association of Girl Guides and Girl Scouts (WAGGGS). The range is based on a Brownie Doll, and will also encompass Scouting activities and outfits. The line made its debut at the London Toy Fair in January 2017 and is expected to launch in July 2017.

=== Toy Like Me Partnership ===
Toy Like Me is an organisation celebrating disabilities, or as they call it "diff:abilities" and calling on international toy manufacturers around the world to represent these kids in the toy market. They collate information on where to buy toys, advise on how to makeover toys for kids, and their ongoing campaigns reflect their aim to make the toy box more reflective of every child. Arklu was quick to respond to the call, with 25% of Lottie dolls with glasses, and agreeing to make future ranges more disability representative. Their range now features a doll, Mia, with a cochlear implant.

Monthly 'Inspired by Real Kids' Competitions

Following the success of previous collaborations with children, the Lottie website invites children to submit designs. The winning designs are occasionally turned into Lottie dolls and outfits which can be purchased through the website.

== Awards ==
Lottie, Finn and friends have been well received within the toy community since their launch, having secured over 20 awards across multiple years and product ranges. Notably, they received the Oppenheim Toy Portfolio Platinum Best Toy Award in 2012, 2013 and 2015, and were a runner-up for both Doll of the Year and Action Figure of the Year during the 2017 TOTY (Toy of the Year) Awards. As Arklu's cofounder and Creative Director, Lucie Follett was winner of the (UK) ToyNews 'Innovator of the Year' Award 2015 and shortlisted for the chiTag (USA) 'Toy Designer of the Year' TAGIE Award 2015.

Follett exited the company in November 2016 and retains a small equity stake in Arklu.
