= Jean Sassoon =

British archaeologist and anthropologist

Jean Brown Sassoon
- Occupations: Archaeologist and anthropologist
- Title: Dr.

Academic background
- Education: University of Edinburgh UCL

Academic work
- Discipline: Archaeology Anthropology
- Institutions: British Museum; Coryndon Museum

Jean Brown Sassoon is an archaeologist and anthropologist.

== Education ==
Sassoon was educated at the University of Edinburgh in 1949. While there, she excavated . She later studied at UCL under V. Gordon Childe, Mortimer Wheeler and Kathleen Kenyon.

== Career ==
At the start of her career, Sassoon worked as an assistant in the ethnography department at the British Museum Antiquities Department. She began work with Louis Leakey at the Coryndon Museum in the 1950s, following her husband to Kenya. Leakey's wife, Mary Leakey was also a member of the museum's staff. Sassoon worked on the excavations of Olduvai Gorge, which were directed by Mary Leakey.

Sassoon catalogued the ethnographic collection of the Coryndon Museum, and collected ethnographic material from various Kenyan ethnic groups for display and study. Initially, her collecting was mainly on behalf of the Coryndon Museum, but she also collected for the British Museum, Pitt Rivers Museum Oxford, The Horniman Museum London, Peabody Museum Yale, and the Museum of Cultural History Los Angeles. Additionally, Sassoon gave lectures at Harvard, UCLA and the Cleveland Museum. Later, she worked as UN's socio-anthropological consultant for development projects in Kenya and southern Sudan.

=== Selected publications ===
Sassoon's publications include books and papers.

- Hunting, Raiding and Warfare: Traditional practices of the Eastern Pastoral Pokot
- Livestock & Traditional Veterinary Medicine of the Eastern Pastoral Pokot (Kenya)
- TIME, SPACE and MEASUREMENT: Beliefs and practices of the Eastern Pastoral Pokot of Kenya

== Personal life ==
She was married to a veterinary virologist, with whom she moved to Kenya.
