= Elizabeth Colwell =

American printmaker and type designer

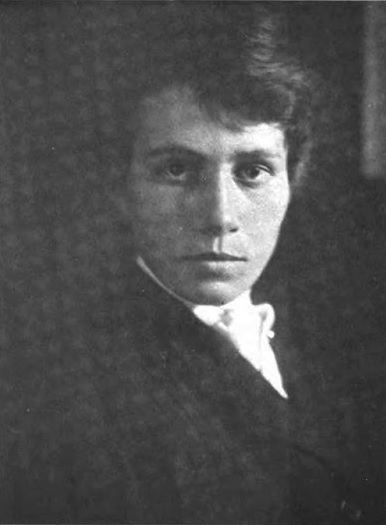
A 1913 portrait of Elizabeth Colwell

Martha Elizabeth Colwell (May 24, 1881 – October 18, 1961) was an American printmaker, typographer, and writer.

== Life ==
Colwell was born Mattie E. Colwell in Colon, Michigan according to 1881 Michigan birth records; according to the 1880 United States census, her family, including parents Elisha and Nancy, and siblings, Frederic, Albert, Fernando, William and Laura, lived on a farm at Burr Oak.

== Education ==
Colwell studied at the School of the Art Institute of Chicago Her instructors included John Vanderpoel and Bror Julius Olsson Nordfeldt, the latter of whom instructed her in the art of Japanese woodblock printing. After becoming acquainted with Thomas Wood Stevens in 1899 she began contributing illustrations and poetry to editions of the magazine The Blue Sky.

== Career ==
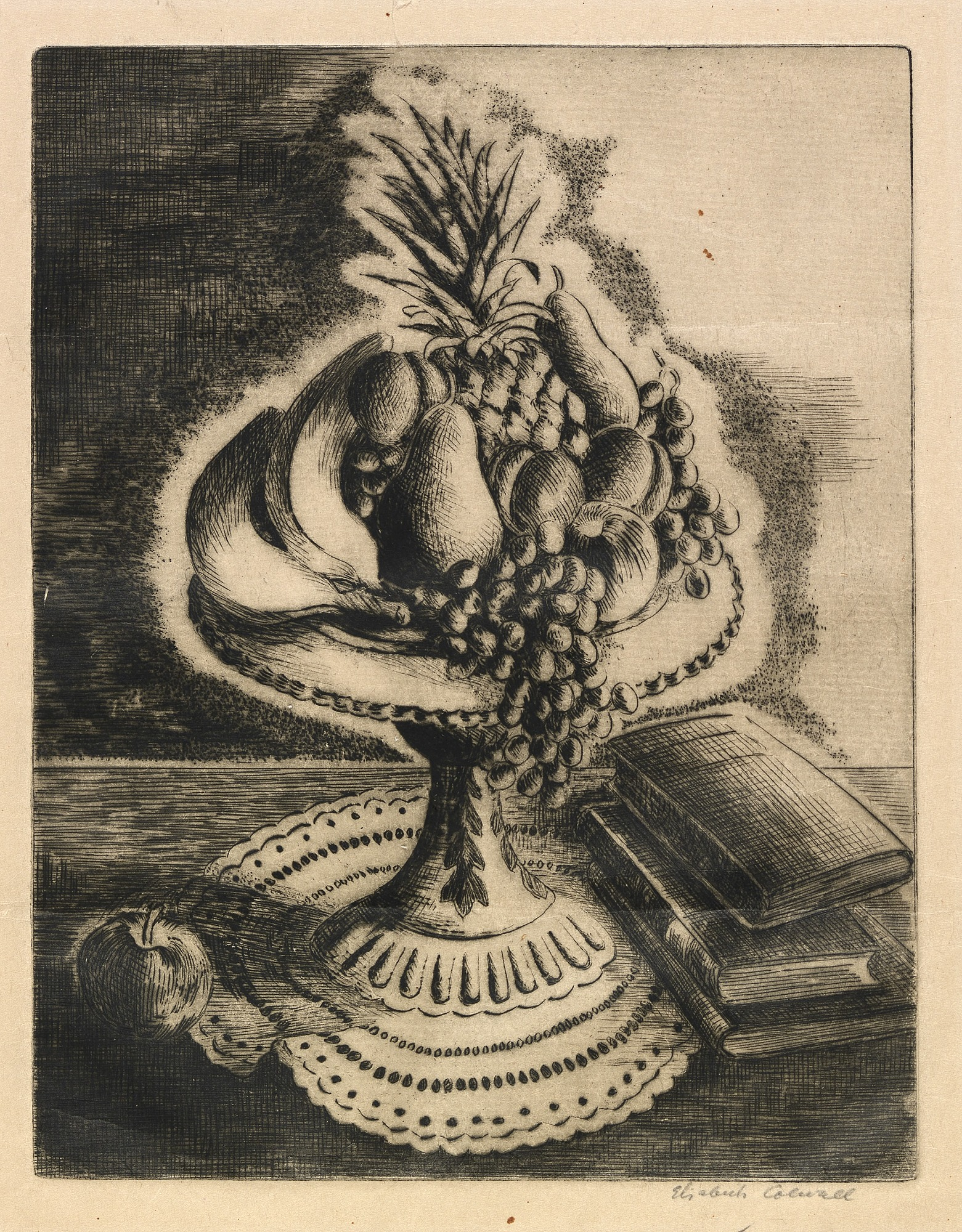
Bowl of Fruit, 1940 etching created by Colwell for the Federal Art Project

During her career Colwell worked in advertising, and she was known for her hand-lettered newspaper advertisements. In 1909 she published a book of poetry, Songs and Sonnets, which she designed and illustrated herself; she published other such books during her career. 1910 saw the publication of the volume On the Making of Wood-Block-Color Prints. For American Type Founders Colwell designed the 1916 display typeface Colwell Handletter and its italic. A 1947 exhibition on the history of type design in American noted her place as the only American female type designer known at that time.

She was associated with the Works Progress Administration during the 1930s; one of her paintings from the period, Bowl of Fruit in watercolor and tempera on panel, is currently owned by Western Illinois University. Several other works are in the collection of the Fine Arts Museums of San Francisco. Colwell exhibited widely throughout her career, and was a member of the Chicago Society of Artists and the Chicago and New York Societies of Etchers.
