= Jason Colwell =

Irish association footballer

Personal information
- Date of birth: 31 January 1974 (age 52)
- Place of birth: Dublin, Ireland
- Position: Midfielder

Senior career*
| Years | Team | Apps | (Gls) |
| 1991–1997 | University College Dublin | 164 | (17) |
| 1997–2003 | Shamrock Rovers | 205 | (6) |
| 2004 | Dublin City | 21 | (0) |
| Total | | 390 | (23) |
- * Club domestic league appearances and goals

Jason Colwell (born 31 January 1974) is an Irish former footballer.

== Career ==
A midfielder Jason made his League of Ireland debut for UCD at Cobh Ramblers on 6 October 1991. After 160 league appearances over 6 years at UCD he joined Shamrock Rovers where he stayed for 6 years making 8 appearances in European competition. Colwell was ever present for three seasons running from the 1995–96 League of Ireland season to 1997–98 League of Ireland.

== Family ==
His father Joe was Chairman of Shamrock Rovers in the late 1990s and also played for Drumcondra in the 1970s.

== Honours ==
- FAI Super Cup
  - Shamrock Rovers 1998
- League of Ireland First Division
  - UCD 1994/95
- League of Ireland First Division Shield
  - UCD 1994/95
- Leinster Senior Cup (football): 2
  - UCD 1994/95, 1995/96

== See also ==
- Association football in the Republic of Ireland
