= Mary Chubb =

British author and archaeologist (1903–2003)

- Born: 22 March 1903
- Died: 22 January 2003 (aged 99)
- Education: Central School of Art
- Occupations: Author and archaeologist
- Employer(s): Egypt Exploration Society; Oriental Institute, University of Chicago
- Father: John Burland Chubb
- Relatives: Stephen Glanville (brother-in-law)
- Family: John Chubb (1746–1818)

Mary Chubb (22 March 1903 – 22 January 2003) was a British writer and archaeologist. She has been described as "the first professional excavation administrator".

== Personal life ==
She was the daughter of John Burland Chubb A.R.I.B.A. (1861–1955), and a descendant of the Bridgwater artist John Chubb (1746–1818). She was a sister-in-law of the Egyptologist Stephen Glanville. At her death, she was buried in the churchyard of Froyle, Hampshire, near her parents.

== Career ==
=== Archaeology ===
Chubb has been described as an "accidental archaeologist". She took as job at the Egypt Exploration Society (EES) to fund her study of sculpture at the Central School of Art in London, and not because she had an interest in archaeology or Egyptology. After a year as the under-secretary at the EES's London base, doing odd jobs as the secretary refused to pass any real work onto her, she felt like quitting. Having been sent into the basement to look for a drawing that was to be included in one of the Society's publications, she found an object that would trigger her interest in archaeology, something that the previous twelve months of work had not. She described this moment in her book Nefertiti Lived Here:

It was a piece of glazed tile—that was all—but at that blank, bleak moment of depression, it touched off some unguessed spring. ... When I turned it over, a trickle of fine yellow sand slipped through my fingers... Egyptian Sand. I was holding something that had scarcely been touched since it had been found in Egypt years before... Suddenly I was invaded by a great longing; I wanted to know all I could about the place where the tile had come from... I looked down at the tile again... a shutter in the mind that till then had separated my living self from everything I had heard about Ancient Egypt, lifted suddenly and quietly.

Chubb left her under-secretary job at the Egypt Exploration Society and volunteered herself as a "secretarial dogsbody" to their excavation of Tell el-Amarna in Egypt. She slowly developed skills and became an important member of the team. Her administrative work "helped to set new standards in archaeological publication". After the end of the dig at Amarna, she joined the excavations in Iraq, at Ur and Eshnunna, run by the Oriental Institute of the University of Chicago; she held the title "Field Secretary to the Iraq Expedition of the Oriental Institute". She then spent 1938 at the University of Chicago writing up their recent excavations.

=== Author ===
After returning to England during World War II, Chubb was involved in an accident that would end her archaeological career. She was hit by a military lorry while riding a bicycle and was seriously injured; she survived the crash but lost her leg and lived the rest of her life physically disabled. In 1942, while recuperating from her injury, she realised it would stop her from attending any more archaeological excavation, and so she turned her talent to writing.

Chubb wrote a number of books on archaeology for the general public and also wrote a number of children's books on people of the ancient world. She also branched out into journalism, writing for magazines such Punch and for the BBC. Her children's book were in the form of alphabet books in which each letter was a word linked to the book's topic and a paragraph followed that explained the word; e.g., in her An Alphabet of Ancient Egypt, the letter C was for cartouches and this was followed by a basic explanation of how to read hieroglyphics. Her two main books were published in the 1950s; Nefertiti Lived Here (1954) and City in the Sand (1957). These books are about Chubb's involvement in the 1930s excavations of Tell el-Amarna in Egypt, and of Ur and Eshnunna in Iraq. They were republished in the 1990s, with new introductions and added epilogues.

She curated her family's archive of the art and papers of her ancestor, the Bridgwater artist John Chubb (1746–1816), and wrote two articles about it in The Countryman. The collection was sold to the Blake Museum, Bridgwater, in 2004.

== Selected works ==
Autobiographical

- Nefertiti Lived Here (1st ed.). London: Geoffrey Bles. 1954.
- City in the Sand (1st ed.). London: Geoffrey Bles. 1957.
- Nefertiti Lived Here (republished ed.). London: Libri. 1998. ISBN 978-1901965018.
- City in the Sand (republished ed.). London: Libri. 1999. ISBN 978-1901965025.

Children's books

- An Alphabet of Ancient Egypt. London: Geoffrey Bles. 1966. ISBN 978-0713801231.
- An Alphabet of Greece, Book I: Early Days. London: Geoffrey Bles. 1967. ISBN 978-0713801903.
- An Alphabet of Greece, Book II: The Golden Years. London: Geoffrey Bles. 1968. ISBN 978-0713802269.
- An Alphabet of Assyria and Babylonia. London: Geoffrey Bles. 1969. ISBN 978-0713802535.
- An Alphabet of Ancient Rome. London: Geoffrey Bles. 1971. ISBN 978-0713802924.
- An Alphabet of the Holy Land. London: Geoffrey Bles. 1973. ISBN 978-0713805307.
