= Glenys Lloyd-Morgan =

Glenys Lloyd-Morgan FSA
- Born: 1945; Halifax
- Died: September 2012 (aged 66–67); Llandudno

Academic background
- Education: University of Birmingham
- Doctoral advisor: Richard Tomlinson

Academic work
- Discipline: Classical archaeology
- Institutions: Grosvenor Museum

Glenys Lloyd-Morgan FSA (1945–September 2012) was a British classical archaeologist. She was the main authority for research on Roman mirrors, particularly from Britain.

== Career ==
Lloyd-Morgan began her university education at the University College of Wales, Aberystwyth, where she studied chemistry and physics for a year, but in 1963 changed her discipline and finally gained her BA in Archaeology and Ancient History at the University of Birmingham. Lloyd-Morgan remained at the University of Birmingham for her PhD, working on Roman mirrors and predecessor artefacts from Britain and Ireland.

In 1973–4, Lloyd-Morgan toured European museums working on Roman mirrors, working in particular at the Museum van Kam in Nijmegen. Lloyd-Morgan also spent time researching at the British School in Rome.

Lloyd-Morgan worked at the Grosvenor Museum, Chester from 1966 as an archaeological assistant. She was involved in community outreach, education, and cataloging the collection. In her 23 years at the Grosvenor Museum, Lloyd-Morgan struggled to advance in her position or receive promotions. However, she used the time to host researchers and to publish widely on Roman mirrors and other small finds. Lloyd-Morgan was a Roman Finds Group committee member for many years.

In 1989, Lloyd-Morgan married and moved to Rochdale where she became a freelance lecturer and small finds consultant specializing in Roman artefacts in Lancashire.

Lloyd-Morgan was elected a Fellow of the Society of Antiquaries of London in March 1979.

=== Illness ===
In 1998, Lloyd-Morgan was diagnosed with early onset Alzheimer's disease. She spent most of the period 1998 to 2012 in care in north Wales.

== Legacy ==
Lloyd-Morgan remains the main authority on Roman mirrors, particularly those found in Britain. Her work on Roman mirrors, and other small finds, resulted in a prolific output of articles and finds reports, which remain the reference point for archaeological surveys of this material.

The 44th newsletter of the Roman Finds Group, Lucerna (January 2013) was dedicated to appreciations of Lloyd-Morgan. Hilary Cool noted that Lloyd-Morgan:

was, and remains, the foremost authority on Roman mirrors in the Western empire.

Lloyd-Morgan was known for her generosity in helping students and researchers:

There is a generation of research students who found a visit to work on material at the Grosvenor Museum at Chester a bright spot in what could be a lonely and soul destroying sojourn working in the basements of endless museums. She would make sure you got the best out of the collection, provide you with information you hadn’t known you needed, and then take you to her home to stay, thus eking out your slender means. (Hilary Cool)

== Selected publications ==
- Description of the Collections in the Rijksmuseum G.M. Kam at Nijmegen: The mirrors, including a description of the Roman mirrors found in the Netherlands, in other Dutch museums, Volume 9 (Ministry of Culture, Recreation and Social Welfare, 1981)
- The Typology and Chronology of Roman Mirrors in Italy and the North Western Provinces, with Special Reference to the Collections in the Netherlands (University of Birmingham, 1977)
