= Betty Baume Clark =

British archaeologist, illustrator, and museum curator

Betty Cable Baume Clark (1915–2002) was a British archaeologist, illustrator, and museum curator.

== Biography ==
Clark studied languages at Newnham College.

Her professional career was influenced by her marriage to J. Desmond Clark, whom she married in 1938. The Clarks together moved to Northern Rhodesia for Desmond's work as curator of the Rhodes-Livingstone Museum. Betty acted as curator of the museum during Desmond's military service during World War II.

Clark was a project manager for many of the excavations she shared with her partner Desmond, for example at the prehistoric site at Kalambo Falls. Betty produced the lithic illustrations for the site. Her work is acknowledged in Volume III of the Kalambo Falls Prehistoric Site monograph series for her "ability and dedication to technological presentation". Betty contributed to many of Clark's publications, including illustrations, typing and data table for Swartkrans. Betty and Desmond also together attended international conferences together, such as the 1961 colloquium African Ecology and Human Evolution held at Burg Wartenstein, Austria.

In her TrowelBlazers biography, Clark is described as being relegated to a "footnote" in the biography of their partner. TrowelBlazers highlights the frustration in finding secondary sources which outline her extensive contributions to archaeology beyond the mentions of Betty Baume Clark "being the partner (for 64 years) and mother of the children of renowned prehistorian J. Desmond Clark."
