= Jane Colwell-Danis =

American paleontologist

Jane Colwell-Danis (born 1941 in Fort Stockton, Texas) is the first formally-trained female vertebrate paleontologist employed in Canada and was known for finding numerous rare fossils in the southern Canadian prairies.

Her work in paleontology began in the late 1950s where a high school science teacher arranged a tour of the Paleontology Lab at the University of California Berkeley. In 1965, she both graduated with a master's degree, having written a thesis on South American Miocene notoungulate mammals (i.e. Notoungulata), and was hired in the fall that year at the newly formed vertebrate paleontology program assisting Dr. Richard C. Fox at the University of Alberta (in Edmonton, Alberta, Canada).

There, her work included preparing fragile vertebrate fossils curating the paleontology collection, where she found a box of fossil microvertebrate samples found by George F. Sternberg in the early 1920s. The locality data for these samples, which included very rare Late Cretaceous mammal material was very poor, but she was able to quickly relocate Sternberg's locality about 45 years later. By relocating the site, she was able to find much additional mammal material, making her the first academic to specifically examine microsites in Dinosaur Provincial Park from a research perspective. Fossil hunting continued in the badlands of southern Alberta and Saskatchewan, Canada where she later found the complete skull of the crocodile Leidyosuchus. She worked in several capacities in Ottawa for the Geological Survey of Canada and National Museum of Canada (now the Canadian Museum of Nature) in paleontological lab and collections management roles. She returned to Alberta in 1979 and was hired at the Provincial Museum of Alberta (now the Royal Alberta Museum), becoming their fossil collections manager in 1982. Soon after she was tasked with packing and moving the entire fossil collection to Drumheller, Alberta for the Tyrrell Museum of Palaeontology, then under construction. She worked there in collections management roles until laid off in 1991. Afterwards, she had a total career change and became the seniors advocate for the town of Drumheller from 1992 to 2007. In her retirement, she volunteered at the Royal Tyrrell Museum of Paleontology.

For several years, Darren Tanke of the Royal Tyrrell Museum of Palaeontology has been writing Jane's biography.
