= Johanna Mestorf =

German prehistoric archaeologist and Professor

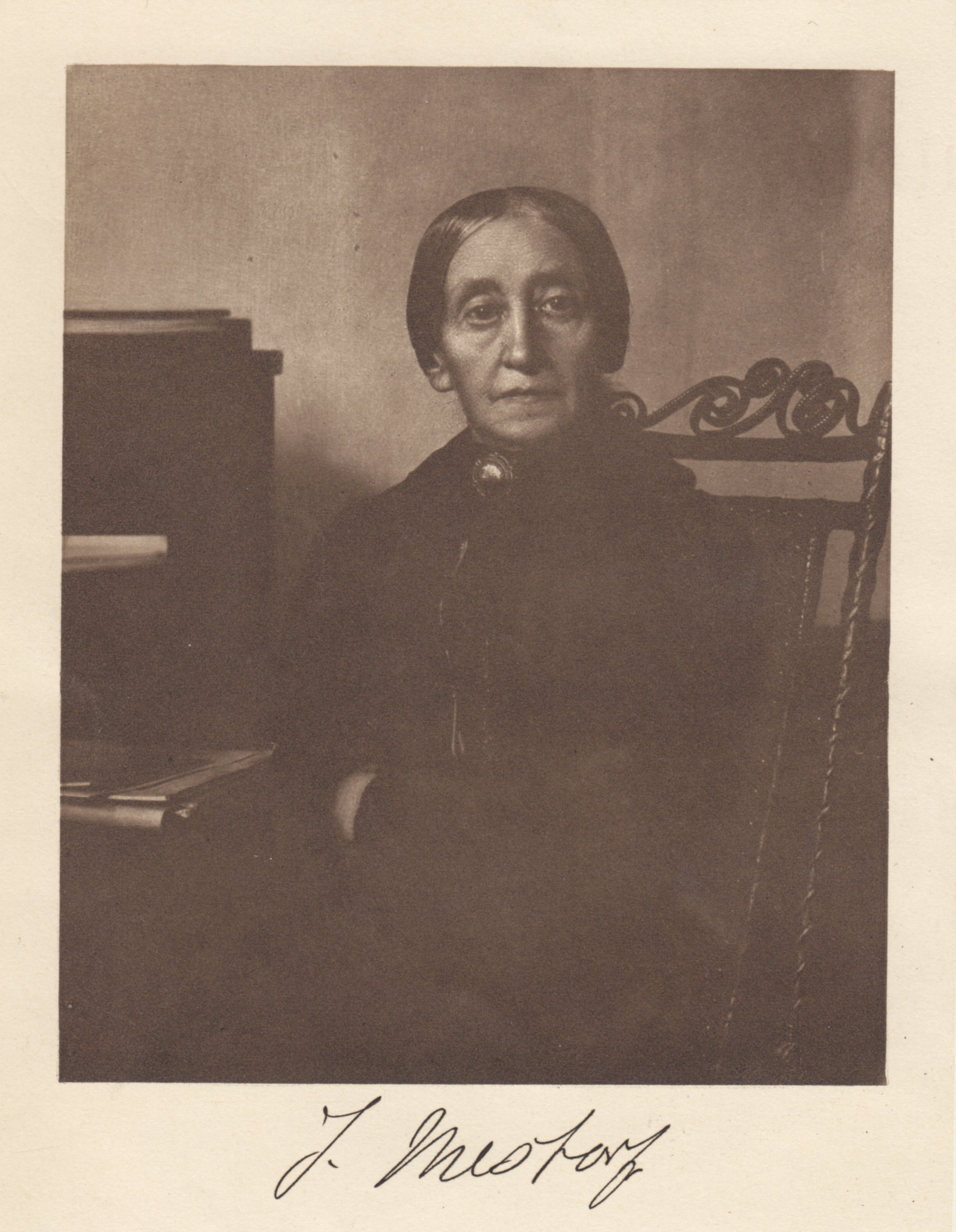

Johanna Mestorf (17 April 1828, Bad Bramstedt, Duchy of Holstein – 20 July 1909, Kiel) was a German prehistoric archaeologist, the first female museum director in the Kingdom of Prussia and usually said to be the first female professor in Germany.

== Life and career ==
Johanna was the youngest of four surviving children of the physician and antiquarian Jacob Heinrich Mestorf and his wife Sophia Katharina Georgine, née Körner. When he died in 1837, she moved with her mother to Itzehoe, where she attended the Blöcker Institute upper school for girls. In 1849 she went to Sweden as a governess to the family of Count Piper at Ängsö Castle, and there also studied Scandinavian languages. In 1853 she returned to Germany, and during the next few years travelled to France and Italy several times as the companion of an Italian countess who was related to the Piper family. Beginning in 1859, she lived with her brother Harro in Hamburg, where in 1867 she took a position as a secretary for foreign correspondence. While working, she became a well-educated self-taught archaeologist.

Beginning in 1863, Mestorf translated important Scandinavian archaeological works into German; these translations had a significant impact on the development of the field in Germany, particularly in establishing the Three-age system and typological study of artifacts. She also began in the 1860s to write literature and articles and essays on ethnography and archaeology, and to give lectures on Norse mythology. She attended the anthropological congress in Copenhagen in 1869, and represented the city state of Hamburg at those in Bologna (1871), Stockholm (1874) and Budapest (1876). She wrote reports on each of these congresses.

In 1868 she was given an honorary post at the Kiel Museum; in 1873 this was merged into the Museum of Antiquities of the Fatherland (Museum vaterländischer Alterthümer), the forerunner of the Schleswig-Holstein State Archaeological Museum at Gottorp Castle and of the Institute for Prehistory and Ancient History at the University of Kiel, at the same time becoming part of the university, and she became its first custodian. In 1891 she succeeded the director, becoming the first female museum director in Germany. She was also responsible for the core of the museum's collections in prehistory and ancient history, beginning with her gift of her father's collection. In 1899, in honour of her 71st birthday and in recognition of her scholarship, the Prussian Ministry of Culture made her an honorary professor. She is usually regarded as the first woman to receive that title in Germany; however, according to the University of Kiel, the first was "a naturalist from the Baltic". She retired on 1 April 1909. On 17 April, her 81st birthday, she received an honorary doctorate in medicine from the university. She had been denied the same honour by the Philosophical Faculty in 1899 because of disagreement on the issue.

Mestorf was one of a group of women denied permission to attend lectures on Goethe at the University of Kiel in 1884/85 because the professor refused to grant it. But in her field she was so respected that Rudolf Virchow and others considered her assistance indispensable for an anthropological exhibition in Berlin in 1880 and persuaded the Ministry of Culture to grant her leave for the purpose.

Her research focussed on the prehistory of Schleswig-Holstein. She coined the terms Single Grave culture (Einzelgrabkultur) for the North German and South Scandinavian region of the Corded Ware culture, Prachtmantel for the characteristic decorative Germanic rectangular cloak, similar to the Roman sagum, and Bog body (Moorleiche) for the human bodies and body parts found in European bogs. She catalogued the prehistoric finds of Schleswig-Holstein and educated the public on the importance of preserving them; she is responsible for the Danevirke and many other archaeological sites having been promptly investigated and preserved. She also concerned herself with documenting and preserving the traditional silver jewellery of Holstein farm families, and donated a collection to the Thaulow Museum.

In 1906, Mestorf made a ℳ︁ 500 deposit in memory of her parents to endow an annual meal of "a strong beef soup with dumplings" for twelve impoverished elderly women in Bramstedt on her mother's birthday, 24 June.

A street on the campus of the University of Kiel is named for her; on it are located the Department for European Ethnology and the Institute for Prehistory and Ancient History, where the Johanna Mestorf lecture theatre is also named for her and has a portrait of her on display. She was buried in her family's area in a Hamburg cemetery; the Schleswig archaeological museum paid for the upkeep of her grave until it was cleared, and the stone has since stood in the reading room of the museum library.

== Honours ==
In addition to her honorary doctorate and professorship, Johanna Mestorf was elected to honorary or corresponding membership in 19 learned societies, including the Berlin Society for Anthropology, Ethnology and Prehistory (1891), the Munich Anthropological Society, the Swedish Association for Prehistory, the Finnish Association for Prehistory and the Anthropological Society of Vienna.

She was awarded the following medals:

- Small Gold Medal for Art and Science (1904)
- Silver Women's Order of Service
- Swedish Gold Medal of the Wife of Oscar I

On her retirement, she received a photograph personally signed by Emperor Wilhelm II, because no other form of recognition was possible for a woman.

== Selected publications ==
- Wiebeke Kruse, eine holsteinische Bauerntochter. Ein Blatt aus der Zeit Christians IV. Hamburg: Meissner, 1866. (historical novelisation)
- Der archäologische Congress in Bologna. Aufzeichnungen. Hamburg: Meissner, 1871.
- Der internationale archäologische und anthropologische Congress in Stockholm am 7. bis 16. August 1874 – siebente Versammlung. Hamburg: Meissner, 1874.
- Der internationale Anthropologen- und Archäologen-Congress in Budapest vom 4. bis 11. September 1876 – achte Versammlung. Hamburg: Meissner, 1876.
- Die vaterländischen Alterthümer Schleswig-Holsteins. Ansprache an unsere Landsleute. Hamburg: Meißner, 1877.
- Vorgeschichtliche Alterthümer aus Schleswig-Holstein. Zum Gedächtnis des fünfzigjährigen Bestehens des Museums vaterländischer Alterthümer in Kiel. Hamburg: Meissner, 1885.
- Katalog der im germanischen Museum befindlichen vorgeschichtlichen Denkmäler. Rosenberg'sche Sammlung. Nuremberg: Germanisches Museum, 1886.
- Urnenfriedhöfe in Schleswig-Holstein. Hamburg: Meissner, 1886.
- "Aus dem Steinalter. Gräber ohne Steinkammer unter Bodenniveau". Mitteilungen des Anthropologischen Vereins in Schleswig-Holstein 1892, pp. 9–24.
- "Moorleichen". In Bericht des Museums Vaterländischer Alterthümer bei der Universität Kiel 42 (1900)
- (with Karl Albert Weber). Wohnstätten der älteren neolithischen Periode in der Kieler Föhrde. Kiel: Lipsius & Tischer, 1904.
- Führer durch das Schleswig-Holsteinische Museum Vaterländischer Altertümer in Kiel. Kiel: Dr. von Schmidt & Klaunig, 1909.

== Sources ==
- Julia K. Koch and Eva-Maria Mertens, eds. Eine Dame zwischen 500 Herren. Johanna Mestorf – Werk und Wirkung. Frauen - Forschung - Archäologie 4. Münster: Waxmann, 2002. ISBN 3-8309-1066-5. Proceedings of a conference held by the University of Kiel in Bad Bramstedt, 15–17 April 1999, in celebration of the centenary of Mestorf's receipt of the title of professor.
- Anna Ziel. "Vom Ehrenamt zur anerkannten Wissenschaft. Die archäologische Karriere der Johanna Mestorf war einzigartig im Norddeutschland des 19. Jahrhunderts". Antike Welt 38.1 (2007) 46–48 (in German)
- Obituary in American Journal of Archaeology 14 (1910) p. 96.
- Obituary in Suomen Museo pp. 91–93 (in Swedish)
